= McLaren MP4/10 =

Formula One racing car

McLaren MP4/10 McLaren MP4/10B McLaren MP4/10C
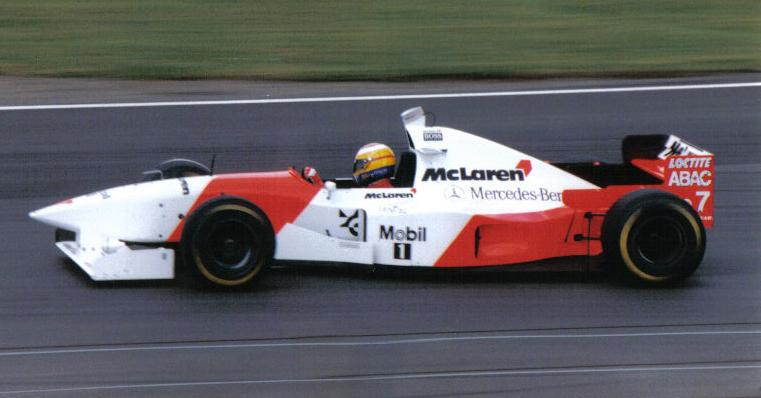
- Mark Blundell driving the MP4/10B at the 1995 British Grand Prix
- Category: Formula One
- Constructor: McLaren
- Designers: Neil Oatley (Executive Engineer); Steve Nichols (Engineering Director); Matthew Jeffreys (Head of Vehicle Design); David North (Head of Transmission); David Neilson (Head of Suspension); Paddy Lowe (Head of R&D); Henri Durand (Head of Aerodynamics); Mario Illien (Technical Director, Engine - Ilmor-Mercedes)
- Predecessor: MP4/9
- Successor: MP4/11

Technical specifications
- Chassis: Carbon fibre and honeycomb composite structure
- Suspension (front): Unequal length wishbones, pushrod, inboard spring/damper
- Suspension (rear): Unequal length wishbones, pushrod, inboard spring/damper
- Engine: Mercedes-Benz FO 110, 2,999 cc (183.0 cu in), 75° V10, NA, mid-engine, longitudinally mounted
- Transmission: McLaren transverse 6-Speed semi-automatic sequential.
- Power: 690 bhp (515 kW; 700 PS) @ 15,600 rpm
- Fuel: Mobil
- Lubricants: Mobil 1
- Tyres: Goodyear

Competition history
- Notable entrants: Marlboro McLaren Mercedes
- Notable drivers: 7. (United Kingdom) Mark Blundell; 7. (United Kingdom) Nigel Mansell; 8. (Finland) Mika Häkkinen; 8. (Denmark) Jan Magnussen
- Debut: 1995 Brazilian Grand Prix
- Last event: 1995 Australian Grand Prix
Races	Wins	Poles	F/Laps
17	0	0	0
- Constructors' Championships: 0
- Drivers' Championships: 0

The McLaren MP4/10 was the Formula One car with which the McLaren team competed in the 1995 Formula One World Championship. The chassis was designed by Neil Oatley, Steve Nichols, Matthew Jeffreys, David North, David Neilson, Paddy Lowe and Henri Durand with Mario Illien designing the bespoke Ilmor engine. It was driven mainly by Mark Blundell, who started the year without a drive, and Mika Häkkinen, who was in his second full season with the team. The car was also driven by 1992 champion Nigel Mansell, and Jan Magnussen.

This was the first McLaren F1 car to run on Mobil fuel until rebranding it into Esso in 2015 with the MP4-30.

== Early season ==
1995 was a season of great expectation for McLaren. The disappointing 1994 alliance with Peugeot had been annulled, and Mercedes-Benz switched to the team from Sauber including third-party engine builder partnership with Ilmor Engineering Ltd. after Ilmor decided to reposition its Formula One program by becoming a third-party engine builder and assembler, and thus earned full-factory works support from Mercedes-Benz. In addition, Mansell had been tempted out of retirement from his two prior years spent in the Indy Car series to partner the youthful Häkkinen. The MP4/10 was a radical design, incorporating a high "needle"-nose design and a wing mounted atop the airbox, among other innovations.

However, it became apparent that Mansell was unable to fit properly in the narrow cockpit, which affected his elbows and hips, that meant he was forced to miss the first two races of the season whilst a wider monocoque was built. His racing return lasted just two further Grands Prix, in San Marino and Spain, before leaving the team altogether, disgusted with the car's poor performance. Blundell, who had replaced Mansell for both the Brazil and Argentina, became a permanent race driver.

Despite handling problems due to a lack of front-end grip, and an often unreliable engine, the package proved competitive enough for the team to usually be "best of the rest", behind Benetton, Williams and Ferrari, and Häkkinen was able to score two podium finishes. Team-mate Blundell also took several points finishes.

== Upgrades ==
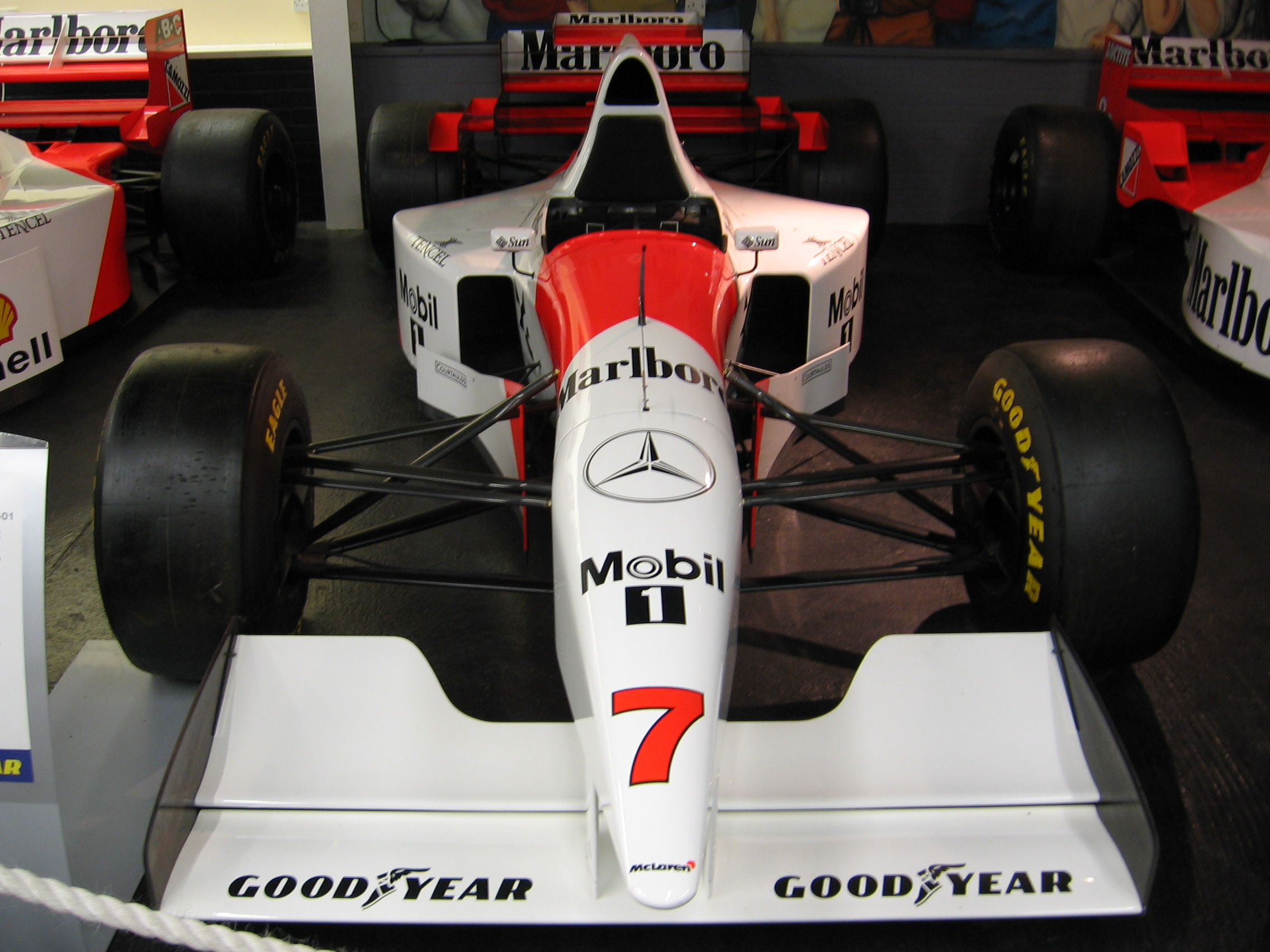
McLaren MP4/10B, driven only twice by Nigel Mansell, with widened cockpit on display at The Donington Collection

The MP4/10B update made its debut at San Marino and was retained for most of the season. A further modification, the MP4/10C, appeared at the Portuguese and European Grands Prix, but was not used further.

McLaren endured a mixed end to the season. Häkkinen missed the Pacific Grand Prix with a case of appendicitis and was replaced by the rookie Jan Magnussen, but returned to finish a fine second in Japan. This was tempered by the fact that Blundell wrote off a chassis in practice, but this setback paled in comparison to Häkkinen's accident during qualifying for the final race of the season in Australia. A sudden left-rear puncture saw his car fly out of control and hit a concrete wall at high speed. Häkkinen was pulled out of his car unconscious with blood pouring from his mouth and nose. However, he made a full recovery for the first Grand Prix of 1996, which was also in Australia.

The team eventually finished fourth in the Constructors' Championship, with 30 points.

== Complete Formula One results ==
(key)

Year	Team	Engine	Tyres	Drivers	No.	1	2	3	4	5	6	7	8	9	10	11	12	13	14	15	16	17	Pts.	WCC
1995	Marlboro McLaren Mercedes	Mercedes-Benz FO110; V10	G			BRA	ARG	SMR	ESP	MON	CAN	FRA	GBR	GER	HUN	BEL	ITA	POR	EUR	PAC	JPN	AUS	30	4th
1995	Marlboro McLaren Mercedes	Mercedes-Benz FO110; V10	G	Mark Blundell	7	6	Ret			5	Ret	11	5	Ret	Ret	5	4	9	Ret	9	7	4	30	4th
1995	Marlboro McLaren Mercedes	Mercedes-Benz FO110; V10	G	Nigel Mansell	7			10	Ret														30	4th
1995	Marlboro McLaren Mercedes	Mercedes-Benz FO110; V10	G	Mika Häkkinen	8	4	Ret	5	Ret	Ret	Ret	7	Ret	Ret	Ret	Ret	2	Ret	8		2	DNS	30	4th
1995	Marlboro McLaren Mercedes	Mercedes-Benz FO110; V10	G	Jan Magnussen	8															10			30	4th
