= McLaren MP4/11 =

Formula One racing car

McLaren MP4/11 McLaren MP4/11B
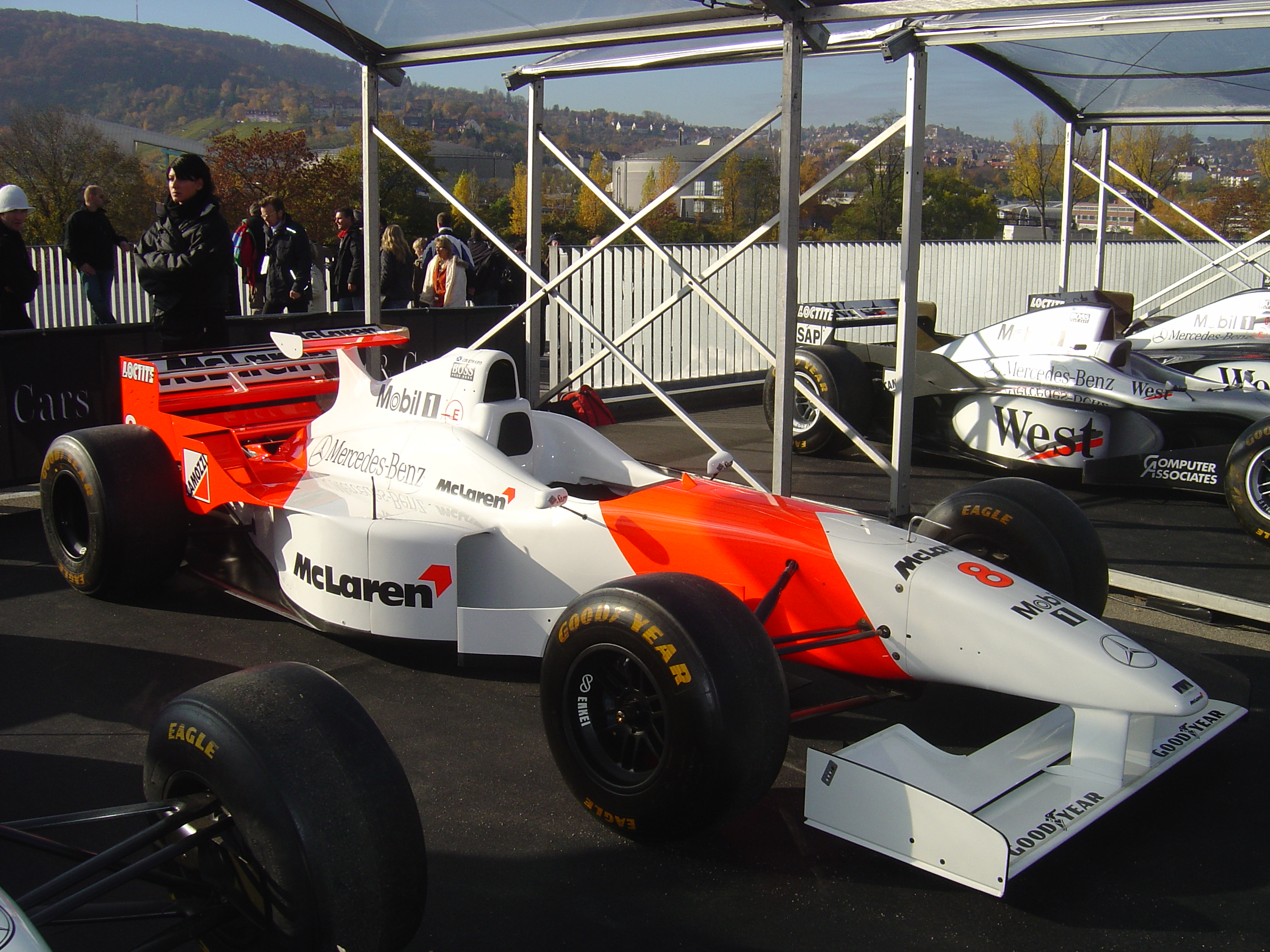
- The MP4/11 on display at Stars and Cars event on Stuttgart in 2007
- Category: Formula One
- Constructor: McLaren
- Designers: Neil Oatley (Executive Engineer); Steve Nichols (Engineering Director); Matthew Jeffreys (Head of Vehicle Design); David North (Head of Transmission); David Neilson (Head of Suspension); Paddy Lowe (Head of R&D); Henri Durand (Head of Aerodynamics); Mario Illien (Technical Director, Engine - Ilmor-Mercedes); Stuart Grove (Chief Designer, Engine - Ilmor-Mercedes)
- Predecessor: MP4/10C
- Successor: MP4/12

Technical specifications
- Chassis: carbon-fibre and honeycomb composite structure
- Suspension (front): inboard spring/damper operated by pushrod bellcrank/unequal-length wishbones
- Suspension (rear): inboard spring/damper operated by pushrod bellcrank/unequal-length wishbones
- Engine: Mercedes-Benz FO 110D 75-degree V10
- Transmission: McLaren six-speed longitudinal semi-automatic sequential
- Power: 720 hp (537 kW) @ 15,700 rpm
- Fuel: Mobil 1
- Tyres: Goodyear

Competition history
- Notable entrants: Marlboro McLaren Mercedes
- Notable drivers: 7. (Finland) Mika Häkkinen; 8. (United Kingdom) David Coulthard
- Debut: 1996 Australian Grand Prix
- Last event: 1996 Japanese Grand Prix
Races	Wins	Podiums	Poles	F/Laps
16	0	6	0	0
- Constructors' Championships: 0
- Drivers' Championships: 0

The McLaren MP4/11 was the car with which the McLaren team competed in the 1996 Formula One World Championship. The chassis was designed by Neil Oatley, Steve Nichols, Matthew Jeffreys, David North, David Neilson, Paddy Lowe and Henri Durand, with Mario Illien designing the bespoke Ilmor engine. It was driven by Finn Mika Häkkinen, who was in his third full season with the team, and Briton David Coulthard, who moved from Williams.

== Overview ==
=== Background ===
McLaren had endured a mostly disappointing season in 1995, with the MP4/10 beset by handling and reliability problems in the team's first year in partnership with Mercedes-Benz, although it did score two podiums and regular points. The second year of the arrangement was to be far more productive with both performance and reliability improved, but the team had yet to make the serious breakthrough necessary to challenge the "big three" of Williams, Ferrari and Benetton.

=== Pre-season testing ===
In pre-season testing, which took place at Estoril in February 1996 and Silverstone in March, four-times world champion Alain Prost was brought in as a technical advisor to test-drive the MP4/11 in Häkkinen's absence, who was still recovering from his near-fatal crash during qualifying for the 1995 Australian Grand Prix.

=== Racing history ===
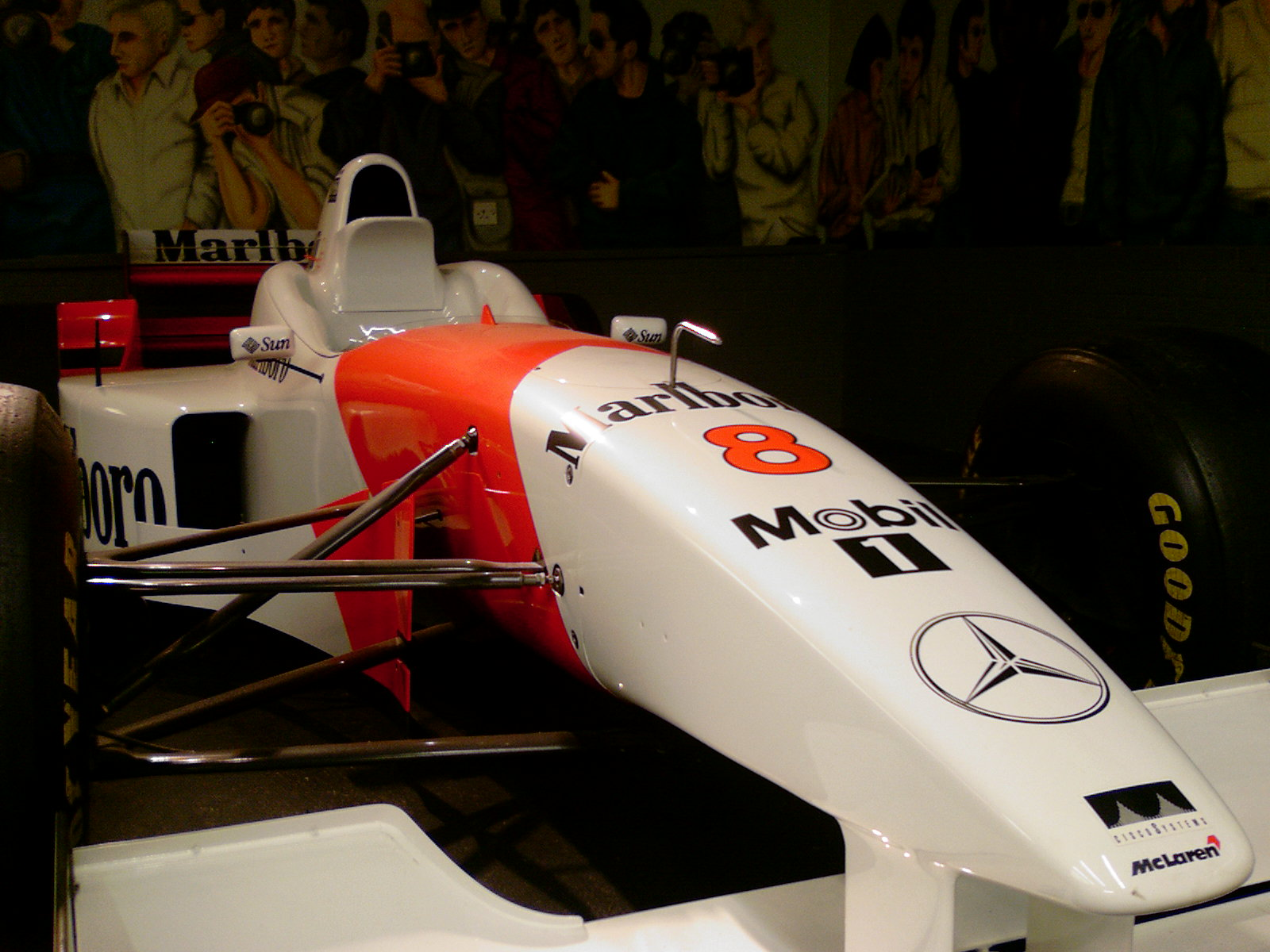
David Coulthard's McLaren MP4/11 exhibited as part of the McLaren Hall, Donington Grand Prix Exhibition

The car's best result came in Monaco, with Coulthard finishing a close second to Olivier Panis' Ligier at the end of a chaotic race. However, Coulthard was outscored and generally outpaced by his teammate.

The car was developed throughout the season, with improvements initiated to eradicate an initial handling imbalance in time for Coulthard to lead the first 19 laps in San Marino. On the MP4/10, a small additional wing was mounted on the engine cover, but this was removed in mid-1995. The wing was brought back for the MP4/11 in Monaco, and was also used at Hungary. A "B" version of the chassis was developed for Silverstone, and Häkkinen responded with four podium finishes from then until the end of the season.

The team eventually finished fourth in the Constructors' Championship, with 49 points.

== Sponsorship and livery ==
This was the final year for Marlboro sponsorship after the team losing their long-term deal with the brand at the end of season, but the team responded by recruiting rival German tobacco brand West, who had previously been the major sponsor of the small German team Zakspeed.

McLaren used the Marlboro logos, except at the French, British, German and European Grands Prix; where they were replaced with a barcode, chevron or "McLaren".

== McLaren MP4-98T ==
In 1998, McLaren took one of the MP4/11s and modified it into a 2-seater. The project was designated as the McLaren MP4-98T and was used ahead of the 1998 British Grand Prix.

== Complete Formula One results ==
(key) (results in bold indicate pole position)

Year	Team	Chassis	Engine	Tyres	Drivers	1	2	3	4	5	6	7	8	9	10	11	12	13	14	15	16	Points	WCC
1996	McLaren		Mercedes V10	**G**		AUS	BRA	ARG	EUR	SMR	MON	ESP	CAN	FRA	GBR	GER	HUN	BEL	ITA	POR	JPN	**49**	**4th**
1996	McLaren	MP4/11	Mercedes V10	**G**	Mika Häkkinen	5	4	Ret	8	8	6	5	5	5								**49**	**4th**
1996	McLaren	MP4/11B	Mercedes V10	**G**	Mika Häkkinen										3	Ret	4	3	3	Ret	3	**49**	**4th**
1996	McLaren	MP4/11	Mercedes V10	**G**	David Coulthard	Ret	Ret	7	3	Ret	2	Ret	4	6								**49**	**4th**
1996	McLaren	MP4/11B	Mercedes V10	**G**	David Coulthard										5	5	Ret	Ret	Ret	13	8	**49**	**4th**
