= McLaren MP4/12 =

Formula One racing car

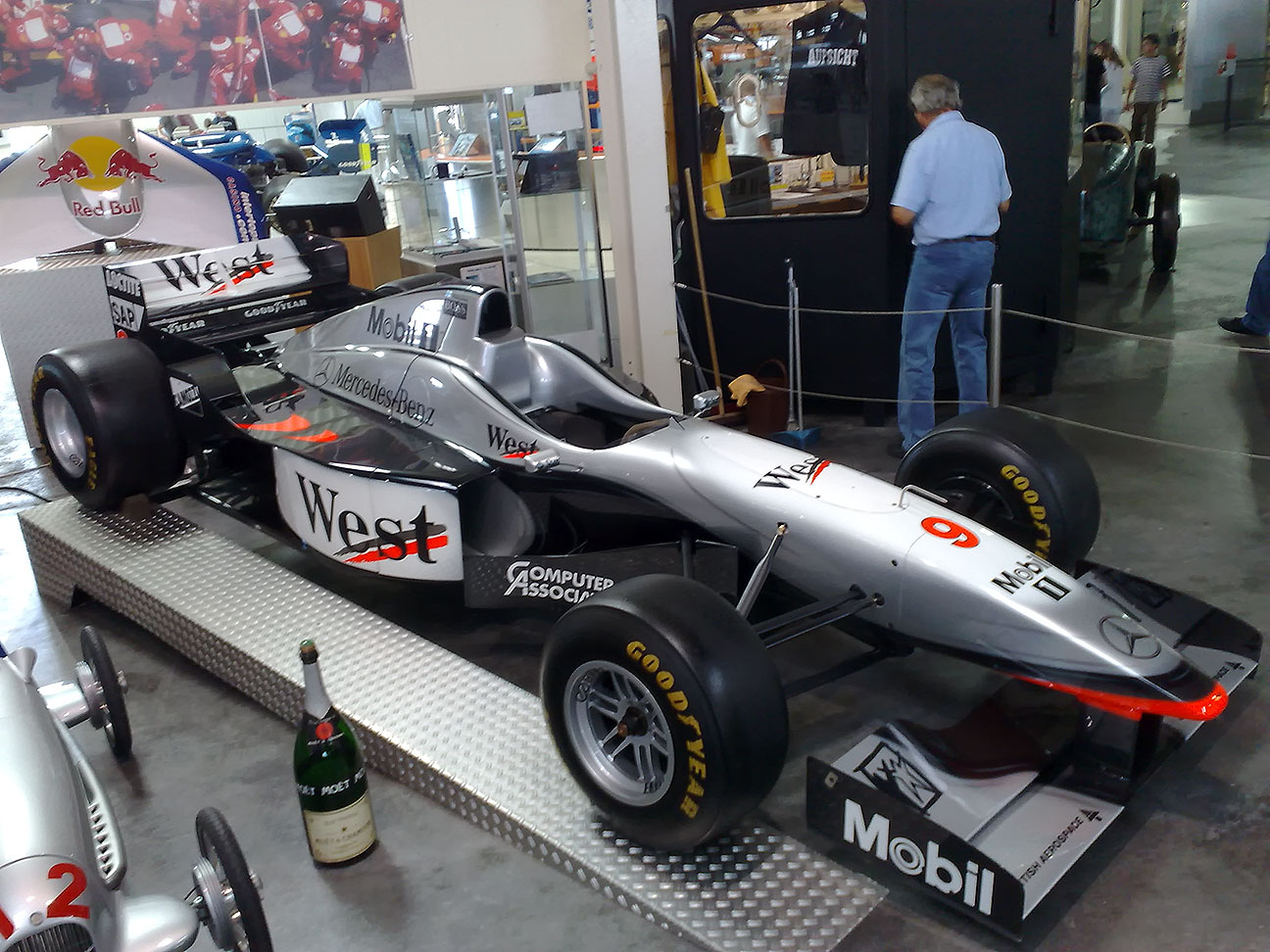
- Mika Häkkinen's MP4/12 on display at the Technik Museum Sinsheim
- Category: Formula One
- Constructor: McLaren
- Designers: Neil Oatley (Executive Engineer); Steve Nichols (Engineering Director); Matthew Jeffreys (Head of Vehicle Design); David North (Head of Transmission); David Neilson (Head of Suspension); Paddy Lowe (Head of R&D); Henri Durand (Head of Aerodynamics); Mario Illien (Technical Director, Engine - Ilmor-Mercedes); Stuart Grove (Chief Designer, Engine - Ilmor-Mercedes)
- Predecessor: MP4/11B
- Successor: MP4/13

Technical specifications
- Chassis: carbon-fibre and honeycomb composite structure
- Suspension (front): double wishbones, pushrod-operated inboard coil spring/damper
- Suspension (rear): double wishbones, pushrod-operated inboard coil spring/damper
- Engine: Mercedes-Benz FO110E (75°) and Mercedes-Benz FO110F (72°) V10s
- Transmission: McLaren six-speed longitudinal semi-automatic sequential.
- Power: 740 hp (551.8 kW) @ 16,000 rpm
- Fuel: Mobil 1
- Tyres: Goodyear

Competition history
- Notable entrants: West McLaren Mercedes
- Notable drivers: 9. (Finland) Mika Häkkinen; 10. (United Kingdom) David Coulthard
- Debut: 1997 Australian Grand Prix
- First win: 1997 Australian Grand Prix
- Last win: 1997 European Grand Prix
- Last event: 1997 European Grand Prix
Races	Wins	Podiums	Poles	F/Laps
17	3	7	1	2
- Constructors' Championships: 0
- Drivers' Championships: 0

The McLaren MP4/12 was the Formula One car with which the McLaren team competed in the 1997 Formula One World Championship. The chassis was designed by Steve Nichols, Neil Oatley and Henri Durand with Mario Illien designing the bespoke Ilmor-Mercedes engine. It was driven by Mika Häkkinen and David Coulthard.

== Background and design ==
=== Chassis ===
Externally, the car was a more streamlined and refined evolution of the previous year's MP4/11.

=== Engine ===
The engines were supplied by Mercedes-Benz for the third year of the Anglo-German alliance.

=== 'Brake Steer System' ===
During the season, F1 Racing photographer Darren Heath noticed that the rear brakes of the McLarens were glowing red in an acceleration zone of the track. The magazine discovered through photos of the inside of the cockpit, that McLaren had installed a second brake pedal, selectable by the driver to act on one of the rear wheels. This allowed the driver to eliminate understeer and reduce wheelspin when exiting slow corners, dubbed "brake steer". Ferrari's protestations to the FIA led to the system being banned the following season at the 1998 Brazilian Grand Prix.

McLaren later designed a road car that shared a similar designation to the MP4/12: the McLaren MP4-12C, which also featured the "brake steer" system.

== Racing history ==
The car proved extremely promising and could have won at least seven races during the course of the season, but reliability proved troublesome, in particular that of the engine. The FO110E engine was replaced with the FO110F engine from the French Grand Prix, but the trouble happened frequently to either engine. This proved frustrating, especially after Coulthard won the first race of the season in Australia, McLaren's first win since losing Ayrton Senna and also Mercedes' first F1 win since the 1955 Italian Grand Prix. The situation was exacerbated by Häkkinen retiring from three further races whilst in the lead - all from engine failures - including at the Nürburgring, where the team lost a comfortable one-two finish when both cars retired with identical failures within a lap of each other. Coulthard also lost a certain victory – at Montreal, with a clutch problem after a precautionary pitstop just a few laps before the race prematurely ended. However, Coulthard did manage to win again at Monza.

The team finally claimed the reward of a one-two finish at the season finale after the collision between Michael Schumacher and Jacques Villeneuve, although it was a contentious finish with many nodding to the fact that Patrick Head of Williams and Ron Dennis of McLaren had negotiations where Villeneuve would give up the lead if the McLarens made sure to steer clear from the troubled Williams. Regardless, this was Häkkinen's first win in F1 and was much celebrated by the F1 world which had been tipping him to win since he first out-qualified Senna in Portugal 1993. The win set him up with a good base to start his 1998 campaign, which he was able to win after a season-long battle with Michael Schumacher.

The team eventually finished fourth in the Constructors' Championship, with 63 points.

== Livery ==
During the pre-season test, the cars were painted in traditional papaya orange interim livery before switching into a new striking black and light silver livery, which was launched to celebrate the team's new title sponsorship deal with West, replacing the red and white Marlboro livery that has been used since 1974.

McLaren used the West logos, except at the French, British and German Grands Prix; where they were replaced with a "double stars" logo.

== Complete Formula One results ==
(key) (results in bold indicate pole position)

Year	Team	Engine	Tyres	Drivers	1	2	3	4	5	6	7	8	9	10	11	12	13	14	15	16	17	Points	WCC
1997	McLaren	Mercedes V10	**G**		AUS	BRA	ARG	SMR	MON	ESP	CAN	FRA	GBR	GER	HUN	BEL	ITA	AUT	LUX	JPN	EUR	**63**	**4th**
1997	McLaren	Mercedes V10	**G**	Mika Häkkinen	3	4	5	6	Ret	7	Ret	Ret	Ret	3	Ret	DSQ	9	Ret	**Ret**	4	1	**63**	**4th**
1997	McLaren	Mercedes V10	**G**	David Coulthard	1	10	Ret	Ret	Ret	6	7	7	4	Ret	Ret	Ret	1	2	Ret	10	2	**63**	**4th**
