= Mika Häkkinen =

Finnish racing driver (born 1968)

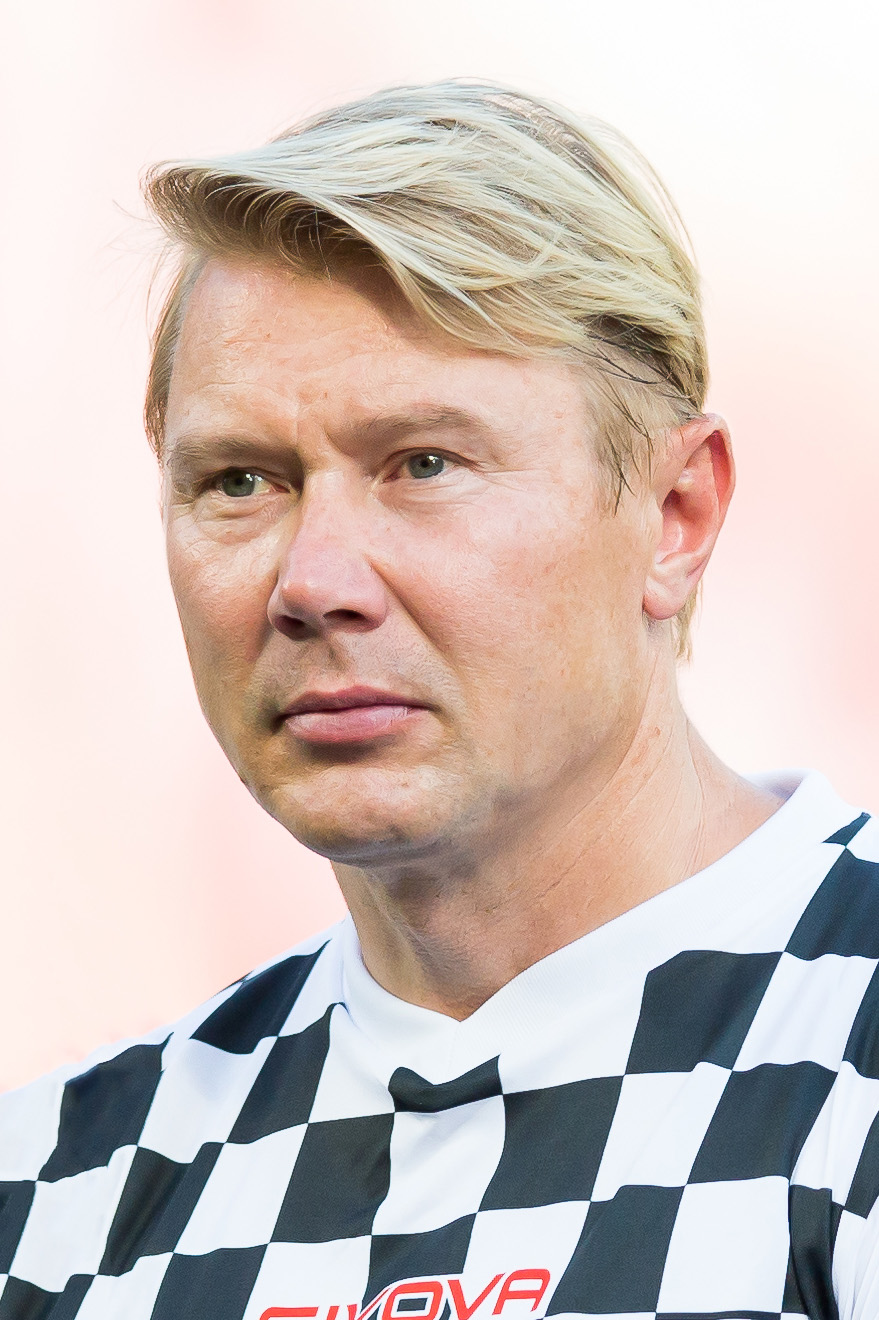
- Häkkinen in 2016
- Born: Mika Pauli Häkkinen; 28 September 1968 (age 58); Vantaa, Uusimaa, Finland
- Spouses: Erja Honkanen (m. 1998; div. 2008) Markéta Remešová (m. 2016)
- Children: 5

Formula One World Championship career
- Nationality: (Finland) Finnish
- Active years: 1991–2001
- Team(s): Lotus, McLaren
- Entries: 165 (161 starts)
- Championships: 2 (1998, 1999)
- Wins: 20
- Podiums: 51
- Career points: 420
- Pole positions: 26
- Fastest laps: 25
- First entry: 1991 United States Grand Prix
- First win: 1997 European Grand Prix
- Last win: 2001 United States Grand Prix
- Last entry: 2001 Japanese Grand Prix

Mika Pauli Häkkinen (Finnish pronunciation: [ˈmikɑ ˈhækːinen]; born 28 September 1968) is a Finnish former racing driver who competed in Formula One from 1991 to 2001. Nicknamed "the Flying Finn", (Note: The Flying Finn is an honorific nickname given to Finnish athletes who are noted for speed in their respective disciplines.) Häkkinen won two Formula One World Drivers' Championship titles, which he won in 1998 and 1999 with McLaren, and won 20 Grands Prix across 11 seasons.

Born and raised in Vantaa, Häkkinen began his career in karting aged five, winning several regional and national championships before graduating to junior formulae in 1987. A protégé of 1982 World Drivers' Champion Keke Rosberg, Häkkinen won his first title in Nordic Formula Ford before winning the 1990 British Formula Three Championship with West Surrey Racing. A member of the Marlboro driver academy, Häkkinen signed for Lotus in 1991, making his Formula One debut at the United States Grand Prix. After two seasons with limited success, Häkkinen moved to McLaren as a test driver in 1993, replacing Michael Andretti for the final three rounds of the season to partner Ayrton Senna; he achieved his maiden podium at the Japanese Grand Prix.

Amidst reliability issues with the Peugeot-powered MP4/9, Häkkinen scored several podiums and finished fourth in 1994. After further winless seasons for McLaren in 1995 and 1996, he achieved his maiden victory at the European Grand Prix in 1997. Amidst a fierce title battle with Michael Schumacher in 1998, Häkkinen won his first championship at the final race of the season, becoming the second World Drivers' Champion from Finland. He successfully defended his title in 1999, beating Eddie Irvine by two points in lieu of an injured Schumacher. Häkkinen won several races during his 2000 campaign, where he was unable to beat Schumacher to a third title. Häkkinen retired at the conclusion of the 2001 season—taking his final victory at the United States Grand Prix—having achieved 20 race wins, 26 pole positions, 25 fastest laps and 51 podiums in Formula One.

After retiring from Formula One, Häkkinen competed in the Deutsche Tourenwagen Masters from 2005 to 2007 for HWA. Upon his retirement from motor racing in 2007, he moved into driver management and became a brand ambassador for Mercedes-AMG. Since 2022, Häkkinen has been a commentator and pundit for Viaplay.

== Early life and career ==
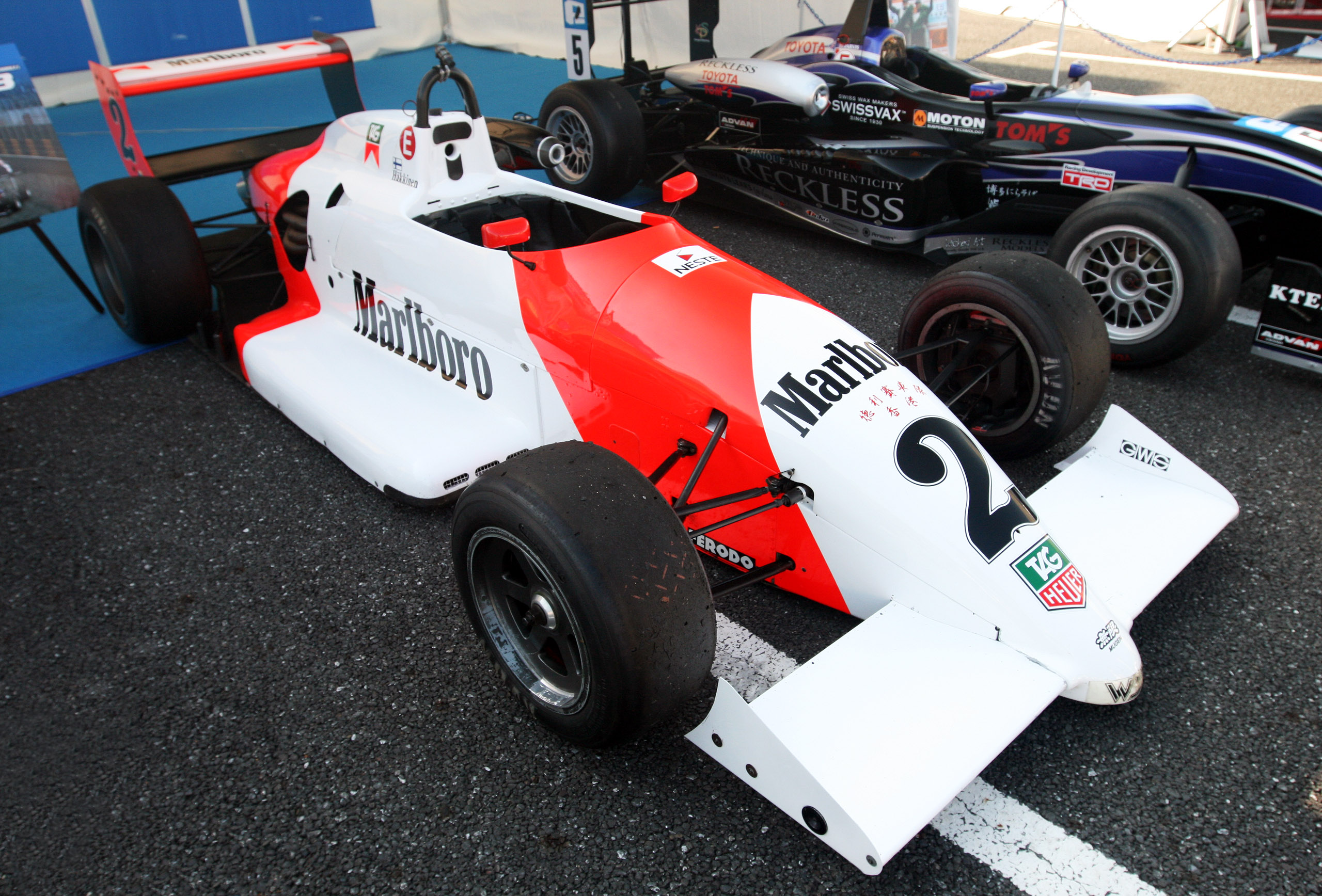
A Ralt RT34 driven by Häkkinen in the 1990 Macau Grand Prix

Häkkinen was born in Helsingin maalaiskunta, Finland, on 28 September 1968 to Harri, a shortwave radio operator and a part-time taxi driver, and Aila Häkkinen, who worked as a secretary. He has one sister, Nina, who ran a fan site for him until its closure in 1998. Häkkinen lived in the same street as Mika Salo with the two later becoming friends. As a child, Häkkinen played ice hockey and football.

When Häkkinen was five years old, his parents rented a go-kart for him to take to a track near their home. Despite an early crash, Häkkinen wished to continue racing, and his father bought him his first go-kart, one that Henri Toivonen had previously competed with. He later won his first karting race in 1975 at the Keimola Motor Stadium where he raced in the regional karting championships in 1978 and 1979, winning the Keimola Club Championship in both years. Häkkinen found further success in 1980 when he won the Swedish Lapland Cup and finished fourth in the 85cc class of the Lapland Karting Championship. Around this time, Häkkinen also drove a Volkswagen Beetle on the frozen lakes of Finland with friend Mika Sohlberg.

In 1981, Häkkinen won his first major karting title, the 85cc class of the Finnish Karting Championship. The following year, he finished runner-up in the 85cc class of the Formula Mini series and later won the Ronnie Peterson Memorial event and the Salpauselka Cup in Lahti. Häkkinen moved to the Formula Nordic 100cc class for 1983, where he became the champion on his first attempt and also participated in the A Junior Team Races for Finland alongside Taru Rinne, Jaana Nyman and Marko Mankonen, with the line-up taking the championship.

In 1984, Häkkinen won the 100cc Formula Nordic title and later participated in the World Kart Championship race held in Liedolsheim. He took his second consecutive 100cc Formula Nordic Championship in 1985 ahead of Jukka Savolainen. He took part in the Nordic Championship A-Class in the same year, finishing runner-up to Tom Kristensen. Häkkinen went to Parma to participate in the World Kart Championship where he retired before the event's final heat due to a mechanical problem. In 1986, he reached his third consecutive Formula Nordic 100cc title and also took part in karting events across Europe. To further fund his career, Häkkinen got a job with a friend repairing bicycles.

In 1987, Häkkinen made the transition from karting to car racing when he purchased a 1986 Reynard Formula Ford 1600 from fellow Finn JJ Lehto. In that year, he entered the Finnish, Swedish and Nordic Formula Ford Championships, winning each title on his first attempt and won nine races combined. Häkkinen also entered two races of the EDFA 1600 Championship and raced in the Formula Ford Festival held at Brands Hatch, where he finished in seventh position. In 1988, Häkkinen entered the GM Vauxhall-Lotus Challenge with the Dragon team, where he secured three victories and finished the runner-up in the championship, behind Allan McNish. He later entered the Opel-Lotus EDFA Euroseries in the same year, taking four victories and became Champion with 126 points, ahead of nearest rival Henrik Larsen.

Going into 1989, Häkkinen moved from the Euroseries into the British Formula 3 Championship driving a Reynard 893 chassis for Dragon. He finished seventh position in the championship, scoring 18 points. He was later invited to participate in the Cellnet Formula Three SuperPrix for West Surrey Racing as a guest driver where he secured pole position and the victory. He also raced in the tenth round of the French Formula 3 championship at Le Mans-Bugatti on 24 September and finished third behind Éric Hélary and Laurent Daumet.

In 1990, Häkkinen applied to become a member of the "Marlboro World Championship Team" through what was akin to a fully sponsored racing driver academy. Its members were short-listed for testing by a judging panel including Marlboro McLaren team principal Ron Dennis, 1976 Formula One World Drivers' Champion James Hunt, and Formula 3000 team bosses, Mike Earle and Hugues de Chaunac. Häkkinen was also a protégé of 1982 World Drivers' Champion Keke Rosberg. In an April 2015 interview, Earle recounted that Häkkinen's application was the last one that he reviewed at the end of a long day, despite protests by Hunt who had already made plans to head to a pub for a beer. Häkkinen performed strongly in his test and went on to secure Marlboro's sponsorship. That same year, therefore, Häkkinen left Dragon and moved to the West Surrey Racing team and won the British Formula 3 series, by taking nine victories en route to the Championship, with 121 points, ahead of fellow Finn Salo. In November, Häkkinen entered the Macau Grand Prix where he drove to pole position and won the first heat of the event. He retired from the second heat due to a last-lap collision with German Formula Three driver and future Formula One rival Michael Schumacher, who was classified as the overall winner.

== Formula One career ==
=== Team Lotus (1991–1992) ===
==== 1991 ====
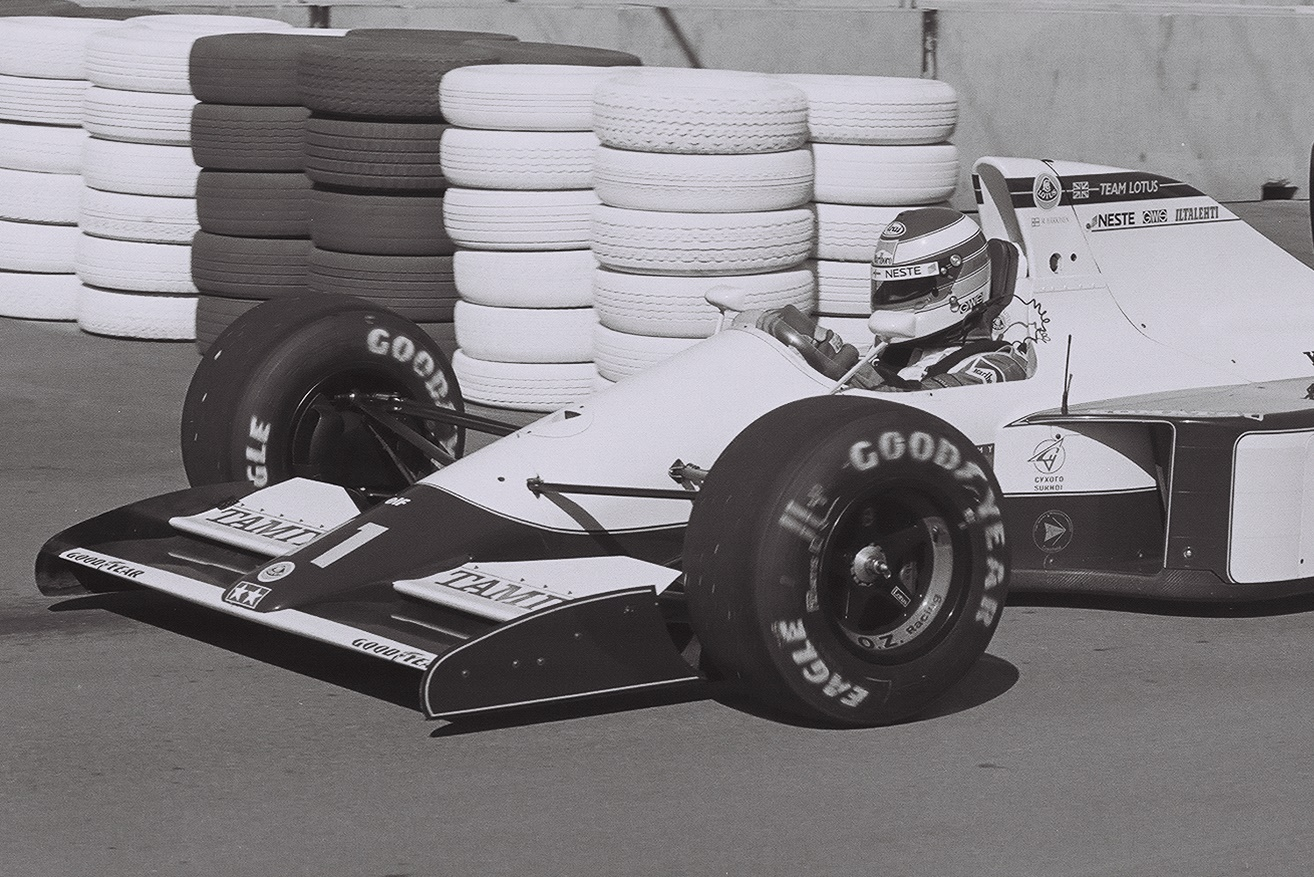
Häkkinen driving for Lotus at the 1991 United States Grand Prix, his Formula One debut race

Häkkinen made his first test in a Formula One car with the Benetton team driving 90 laps around the Silverstone Circuit and set quicker lap times than regular driver Alessandro Nannini. He found it difficult to fit into the Benetton but liked the steering and throttle response. Häkkinen expected not to be offered a seat at Benetton and he decided to sign with the Lotus team for the 1991 season. Making his debut in the United States Grand Prix alongside teammate Julian Bailey, Häkkinen qualified thirteenth on the grid and suffered an engine failure on the sixtieth lap and was classified thirteenth. The next race in Brazil saw him finish ninth, and scored his first Formula One points by reaching fifth place in San Marino. Häkkinen suffered from a dip in race form as he encountered consecutive retirements in the next two races—his car suffered from an oil leak in Monaco and spun out in Canada. Before Canada, Bailey lost his seat at Lotus due to a lack of funding, so Häkkinen was partnered by Johnny Herbert and Michael Bartels throughout the remainder of the season.

Although Häkkinen secured a ninth-place finish in Mexico, he did not qualify for the French Grand Prix. Over the remainder of the season, he did not finish four of the nine races he entered. Häkkinen finished his debut season sixteenth in the Drivers' Championship, scoring two points.

==== 1992 ====
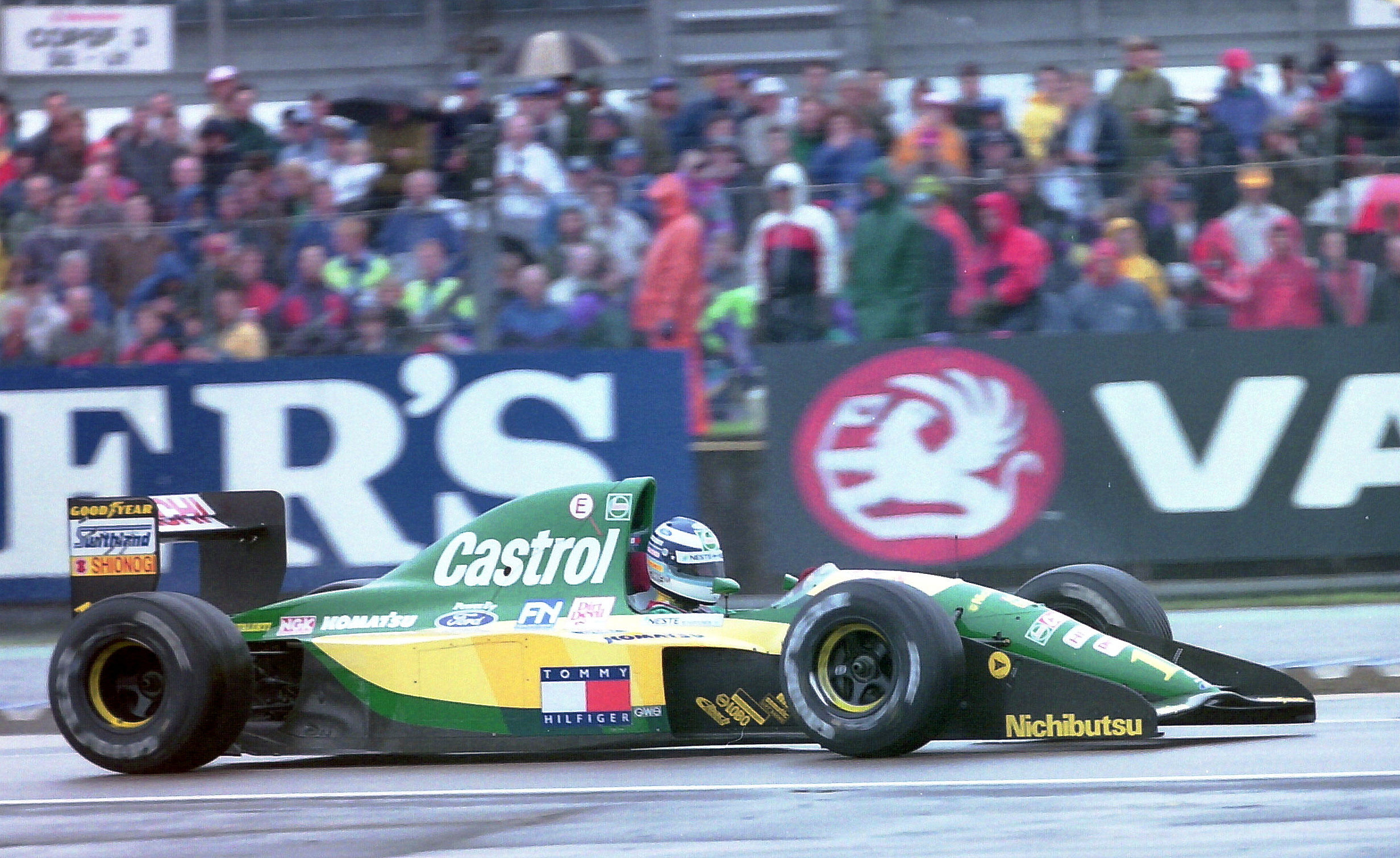
Häkkinen at the 1992 British Grand Prix

Häkkinen remained at Lotus for 1992 and was partnered by Herbert. At the opening round of the season in South Africa, Häkkinen finished in ninth position, which he followed up with his first points of the season in Mexico. He took a further finish in Brazil, although he did not qualify for the San Marino Grand Prix and suffered consecutive retirements in the following two races. At Monaco, Lotus introduced their new car, the Lotus 107. Häkkinen later gathered further consecutive points in the following two races, before he was forced into retirement at the German Grand Prix due to an engine failure. A similar pattern followed in the next three races, which was broken when he finished fifth in Portugal and suffered a retirement at the penultimate round of the year in Japan. Häkkinen concluded the season with a seventh-place finish in Australia.

During the season, Häkkinen became embroiled in a contract dispute. Häkkinen, who was under contract to Lotus, opted to join Williams. However, Williams had not submitted their entry for the 1993 season, and Häkkinen was unable to join the team when he learnt that Lotus team principal Peter Collins would veto the Williams team entry if they had signed Häkkinen. Häkkinen later approached Ligier although his contract contained a clause of which his manager Keke Rosberg disagreed. He later approached McLaren team principal Ron Dennis for a contract with the team, which was drafted at Courchevel Airport. The dispute eventually went to the Formula One Contract Recognition Board, who ruled in favour of McLaren after two days of deliberation.

=== McLaren (1993–2001) ===
==== 1993 ====
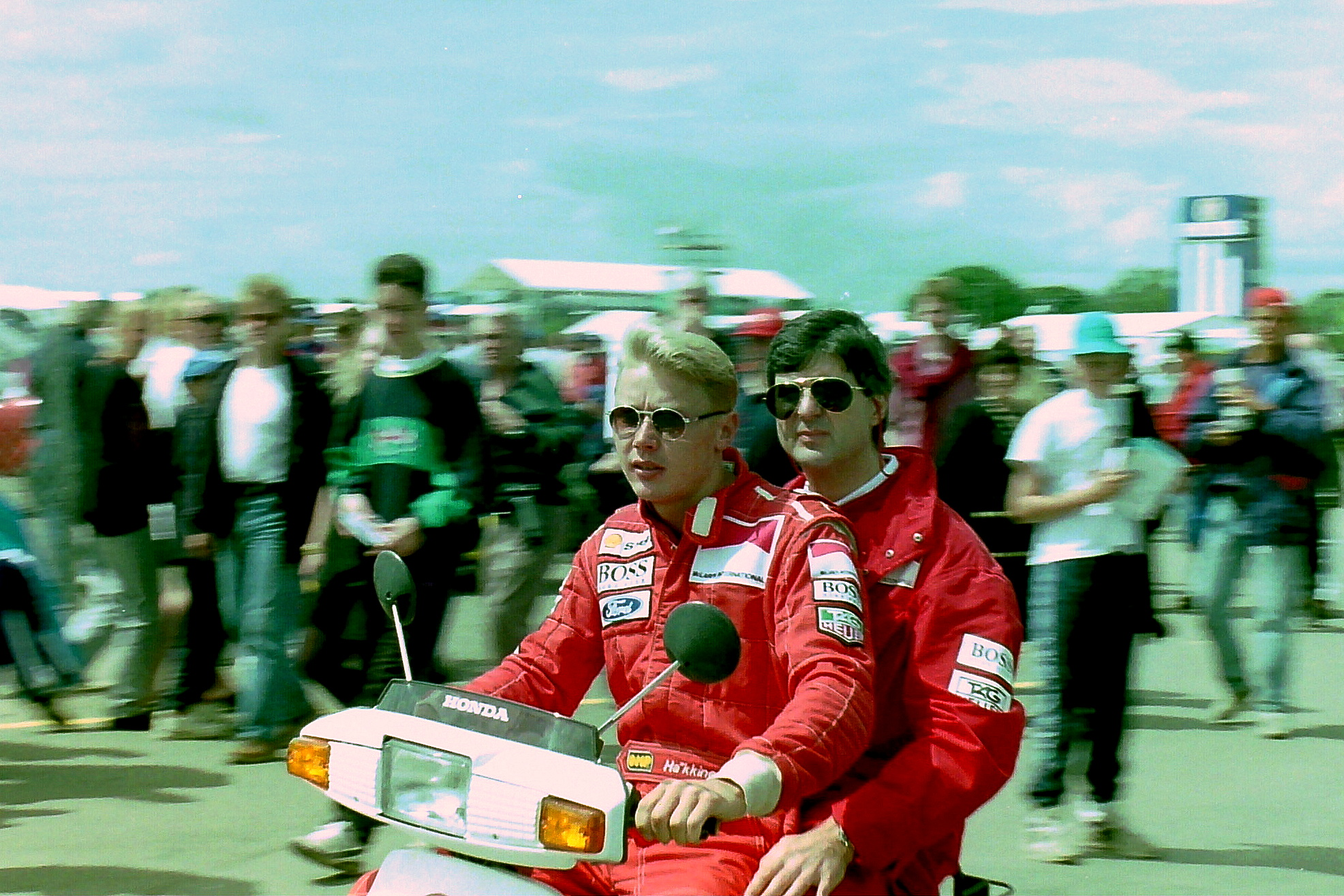
Häkkinen in the paddock before the 1993 British Grand Prix

For 1993, Häkkinen joined McLaren, originally as a race driver, although he became the team's official test driver when CART driver Michael Andretti was hired by the team. Apart from regular testing duties, Häkkinen entered two Porsche Supercup races, held as a support race for the Monaco Grand Prix, where he started at pole position and took victory in both races. He was promoted to a Formula One race seat after the Italian Grand Prix, when Andretti left Formula One. Häkkinen entered the Portuguese Grand Prix where he out-qualified regular driver Ayrton Senna. During the race, he retired due to collision with a concrete wall. At the next race held in Japan, Häkkinen claimed the first podium of his career with a third-place finish, and ended the season when his McLaren car suffered a brake pipe failure in Australia. Häkkinen concluded the season with 15th in the Drivers' Championship, scoring four points. In December, McLaren confirmed that Häkkinen would remain with the team on a three-year contract from the 1994 season onwards.

During 1993, Häkkinen, along with Senna, tested the Lamborghini V12 engine in a modified version of the McLaren MP4/8 race car dubbed the "MP4/8B" at both Estoril and Silverstone. Both drivers were impressed with the engine, with Häkkinen reportedly lapping Silverstone some 1.4 seconds faster in the MP4/8B with its V12 engine than he had with the team's race car fitted with the Ford V8.

==== 1994 ====
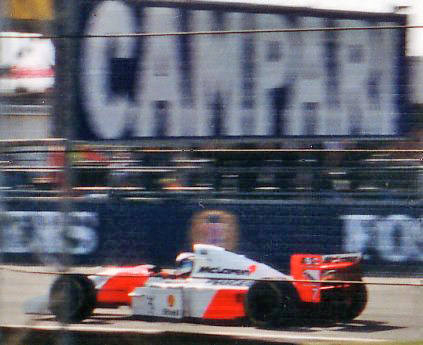
Häkkinen driving for McLaren at the 1994 British Grand Prix

Häkkinen stayed at McLaren for 1994 and was partnered by experienced driver Martin Brundle. He endured a torrid start: at the first two races of the season, Häkkinen retired as his car developed engine problems in the Brazilian Grand Prix and gearbox issues in the Pacific Grand Prix which included a collision with Senna on the first lap. He later reached his first podium finish of the season at the San Marino Grand Prix, although he suffered a dip in form as he was forced into consecutive retirements in the next four races.

Häkkinen raced to a further podium finish at the British Grand Prix, despite a last-lap collision with Jordan driver Rubens Barrichello for which he received a one-race ban, suspended for three races. The ban was enforced after the German Grand Prix, where Häkkinen collided with Williams driver David Coulthard with the Finn's car sliding into another group of cars. He was replaced by Philippe Alliot for the next race in Hungary.

Häkkinen returned for the Belgian Grand Prix, initially coming third but was later promoted to second after the disqualification of Benetton driver Michael Schumacher. He got consecutive 3rd-place podium finishes in the next three races, before rounding off the season by finishing the final two races in Japan and Australia, albeit outside of the points scoring positions. Häkkinen managed a fourth place in the Drivers' Championship, scoring 26 points.

==== 1995 ====
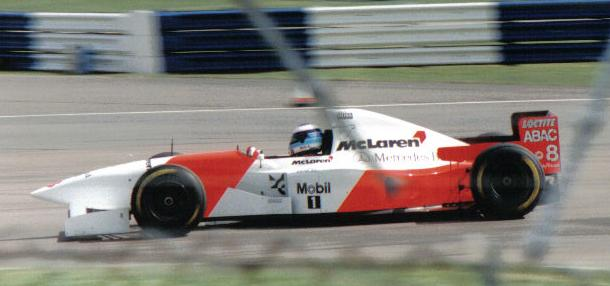
Häkkinen driving for McLaren at the 1995 British Grand Prix

Häkkinen remained at McLaren for 1995, and was partnered by Nigel Mansell. During pre-season testing, Häkkinen and teammate Mansell complained the car, the McLaren MP4/10, was not wide enough to fit in, resulting in their hands and elbows striking the sides of the cockpit. Mansell was forced to miss the opening two rounds, so Häkkinen was partnered with Mark Blundell.

Häkkinen started off the season by finishing fourth in Brazil, and later retired in Argentina due to a collision which punctured his left rear tyre that followed a spin. He took a further points finish with a fifth place at San Marino, before suffering from consecutive retirements in the next three races. For the French Grand Prix, McLaren introduced a revised version of their car, the McLaren MP4/10B. This did not revive Häkkinen's fortunes as he did not finish in the points scoring positions, and later suffered consecutive retirements in the next four races, but got second place at the Italian Grand Prix. He was forced to miss the Pacific Grand Prix due to an operation for appendicitis and was replaced by Jan Magnussen. He returned for the Japanese Grand Prix, with a second-place finish.

At the season finale held in Australia, Häkkinen's car suffered a tyre failure during the event's first qualifying session on Friday, which resulted in his car becoming airborne and crashing sideways into the crash barrier on the outside of Brewery corner, the fastest corner of the Adelaide Street Circuit, at an estimated speed of 120 mph. The session was suspended with Häkkinen being critically injured due to sustaining a skull fracture, internal bleeding and a blockage of his airway. His life was saved by the efforts of the trackside medical team, including the President of the FIA Institute for Motor Sport Safety, Sid Watkins, and volunteer doctors Jerome Cockings and Steve Lewis, from the Royal Adelaide Hospital. Cockings performed an emergency tracheotomy on the track, delivering oxygen to enable Häkkinen to breathe. Watkins later arrived in the medical car, allowing the doctors to continue, restarting Häkkinen's heart twice. Häkkinen was immediately transported by ambulance to the nearby Royal Adelaide Hospital which was located about half a kilometre from the circuit. There he remained in a critical condition under care of the Trauma Service, the Neurosurgical Unit, and the Intensive Care Unit and remained in the hospital for approximately two months. He eventually made a remarkable recovery. As an expression of thanks for the elite class medical attention he received, Häkkinen donated a substantial undisclosed sum of money to help build a much-needed helipad for The Royal Adelaide Hospital, and made a special trip to Australia for the official opening ceremony in March 1997.

Häkkinen finished the 1995 season seventh in the Drivers' Championship, with 17 points.

==== 1996 ====
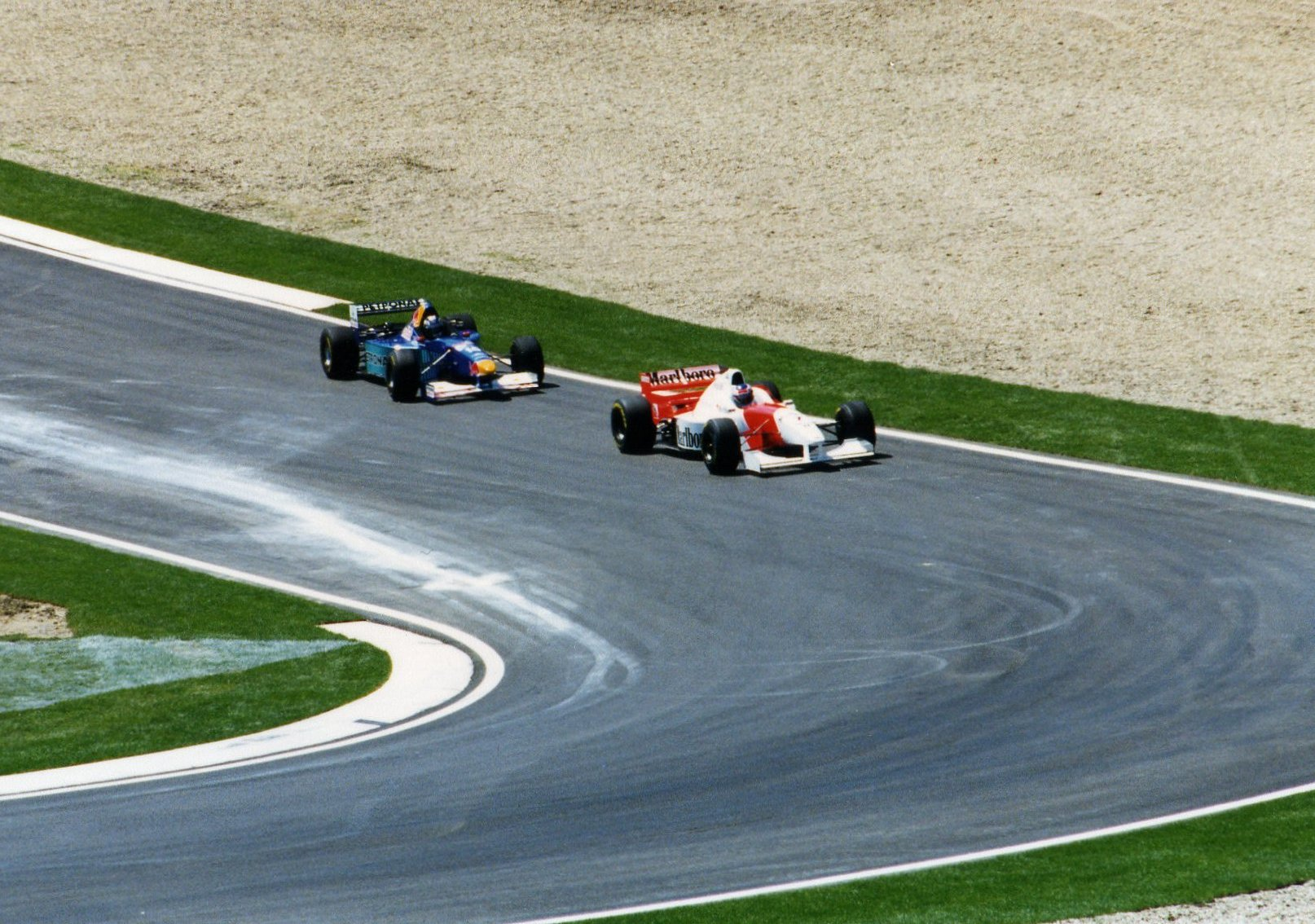
Häkkinen and Johnny Herbert during free practice of 1996 San Marino Grand Prix

The 1996 season was the first in which Häkkinen was the more experienced driver in his team and was partnered by David Coulthard. Häkkinen was confident going into the season and set himself a target of winning races. To ensure his fitness, Häkkinen spent time training in Bali and in February, McLaren conducted a secret test at the Paul Ricard Circuit. In the event that Häkkinen was not prepared, McLaren had Magnussen to replace him should the need arise. The season started well for Häkkinen: He earned consecutive points-scoring positions in the opening two rounds, before he suffered his first retirement of the season in Argentina as his car developed a throttle problem. He later finished the next two races, albeit outside of the points scoring positions, before returning consecutive finishes inside of the points in the following four races.

In the following race held in Britain where McLaren brought a revised version of the car, their McLaren MP4/11B, Häkkinen reached his first podium finish of the season with third place. However, he retired from the next race held in Germany due to a gearbox failure. This marked a turning point in Häkkinen's season as he finished the next three races, including consecutive third-place finishes in Belgium and Italy. In September, it was announced that Häkkinen would remain at McLaren for 1997, having previously been linked to Williams and Benetton. He retired from the penultimate round in Portugal resulting a collision with teammate Coulthard, damaging Häkkinen's front wing and eventually led to his retirement on the 52nd lap of the race. He rounded off the season with a third-place finish in season finale held in Japan. Häkkinen finished the season fifth in the Drivers' Championship, scoring 31 points.

==== 1997: Maiden win ====
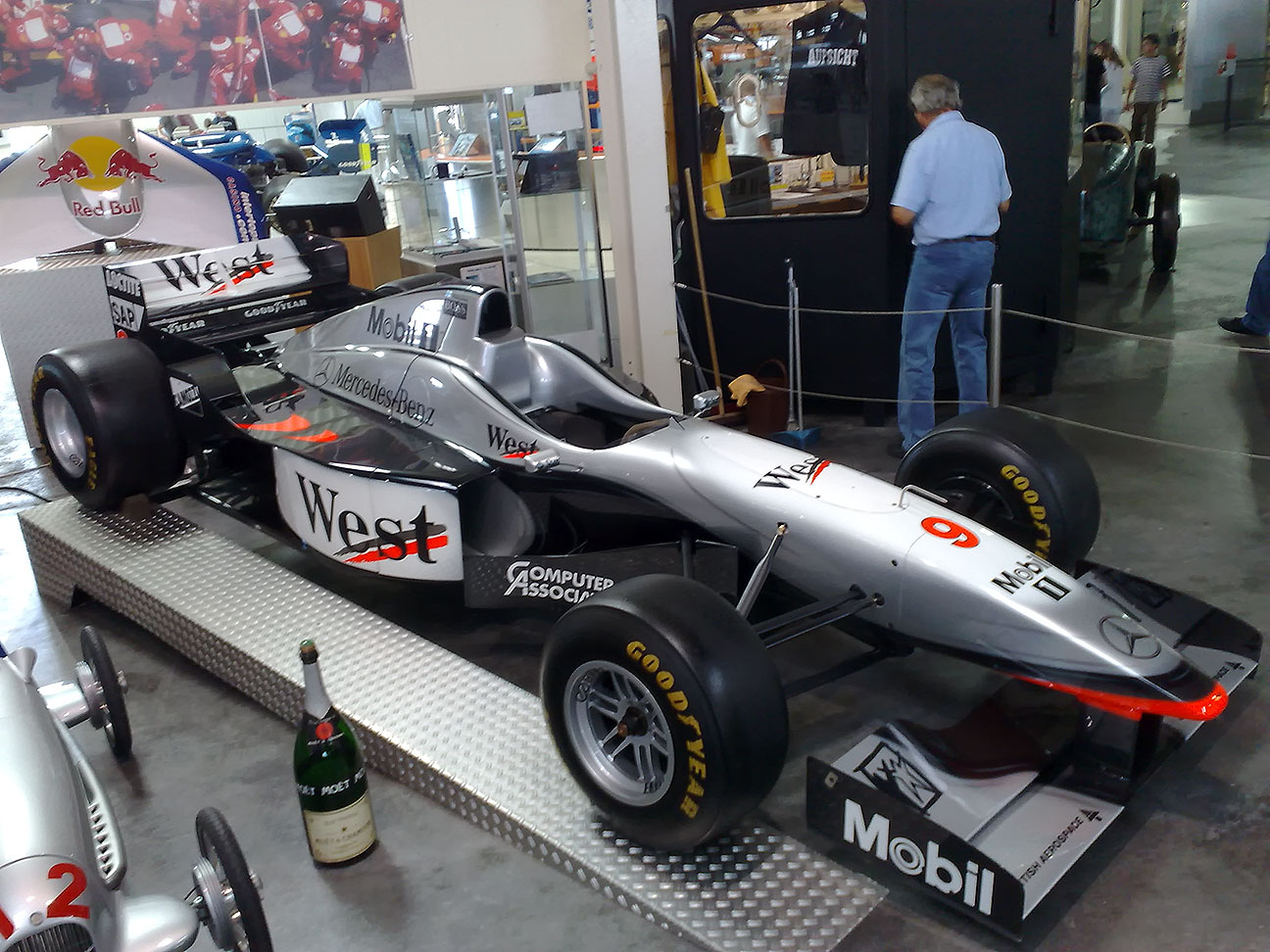
The McLaren MP4/12, driven by Häkkinen in 1997

Häkkinen again remained at McLaren for 1997 and Coulthard remained his teammate. Häkkinen's season got off to a good start: In the season-opening race in Australia, he drove up to the third position and later scored further consecutive finishes inside of the points scoring positions in the next three races. He suffered his first retirement of the season at the Monaco Grand Prix when he was involved in a collision with Benetton driver Jean Alesi. Häkkinen later took ninth position at the Spanish Grand Prix, but later suffered three consecutive retirements in the next three races—a collision with Ferrari driver Eddie Irvine in Canada and engine failures in France and Britain. At the latter race, he had seemed set for his first win, but his engine blew while he was holding off eventual winner Jacques Villeneuve.

Häkkinen secured another podium finish with third place in Germany and later retired from an hydraulic problem in Hungary. He later secured third place in the Belgian Grand Prix but was later disqualified when it was discovered that his car used an illegal type of fuel during the event. He secured a ninth-place finish in Italy and later suffered from consecutive retirements in the next two races—engine failures in the Austrian Grand Prix and the Luxembourg Grand Prix while leading both races. Häkkinen ended the season with a fourth position in the penultimate round in Japan and raced to his first Formula One victory at the season closing European Grand Prix. Häkkinen ended the season sixth in the Drivers' Championship, with 27 points.

==== 1998: First World Championship ====
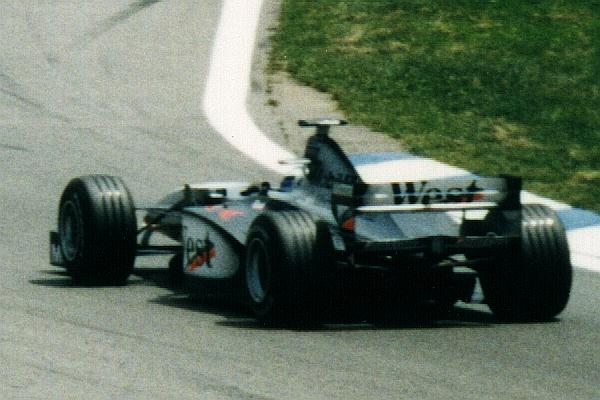
Häkkinen driving for McLaren at the 1998 Spanish Grand Prix, where he claimed his third win in the first five races of the season

Häkkinen remained at McLaren for 1998, partnered by Coulthard. Häkkinen was confident going about the challenge for the World Championship into the season, citing the involvement of technical director Adrian Newey. The season started off with controversy in Australia when teammate Coulthard let Häkkinen past to win the race. Häkkinen had earlier been called into the pit lane by an engineer by mistake. Coulthard later revealed a pre-race agreement by the team that whoever led into the first corner on the first lap would be allowed to win the race. Despite this, Häkkinen took back-to-back victories by winning the next race in Brazil. He maintained his good form at the Argentine Grand Prix where he finished second, although he retired from the San Marino Grand Prix when his car's gearbox failed. However, Häkkinen managed consecutive victories in the next two rounds, which was followed by a retirement from the race in Canada as his car suffered another gearbox failure.

Häkkinen followed this up by taking consecutive podiums in the next two rounds—third in France and second in Britain. He managed further consecutive victories in the next two rounds, and followed this up with a sixth-place finish in Hungary. In August, it was announced that Häkkinen and Coulthard would be retained for 1999. Häkkinen retired from the following race held in Belgium when Ferrari driver Michael Schumacher collided with the Finn and was also hit by Sauber driver Johnny Herbert. He later managed a fourth position in Italy despite suffering from brake problems resulting from a spin. Häkkinen finished the season by taking victory in the final two rounds at the Luxembourg Grand Prix and the Japanese Grand Prix, which ensured he took enough points to clinch the 1998 World Championship, with 100 points, ahead of nearest rival Schumacher. Häkkinen was awarded the Autosport International Racing Driver Award for 1998. He was also named the Finnish Sports Personality of the Year by journalists. The Finnish Post Office issued stamps to commemorate Häkkinen's World Championship in January 1999.

==== 1999: Second World Championship ====
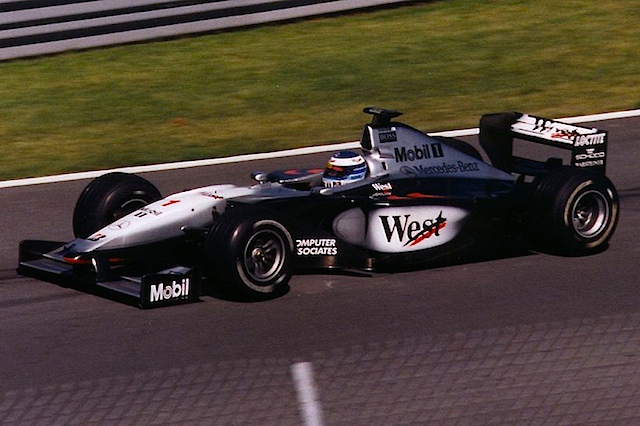
Häkkinen driving for McLaren at the 1999 Canadian Grand Prix, where he drove to his third victory of the season

Häkkinen remained at McLaren for 1999, with Coulthard partnering him for the upcoming season. The team suffered problems with their car, the McLaren MP4/14, during pre-season testing, resulting in a lack of preparation. Despite these setbacks, Häkkinen was confident going into the season, saying: "I've gained confidence and experience and am more relaxed. With this title I no longer have to tell myself every morning I can win, to put pressure on myself."

At the opening round in Australia, Häkkinen was forced into retiring as his car developed a throttle issue. However, he managed his first victory of the season in Brazil, despite his car developing a gearbox problem early in the race. Häkkinen retired from the race in San Marino when he collided with a barrier while leading. At the Monaco Grand Prix, Häkkinen finished in third place, having slid on oil left on the track surface in the race. He followed up the results by having consecutive victories in the races held in Spain and Canada. Häkkinen took a second-place finish in France, and was forced into another retirement in Britain, as a result of a wheel failure. During the Austrian Grand Prix, Häkkinen who started from pole position, was hit by Coulthard from behind and rejoined at the back of the field. Häkkinen eventually finished in third place.

During the German Grand Prix, it was announced that Häkkinen would remain at McLaren for 2000. Häkkinen encountered further bad fortunes in the race when his car's right rear tyre exploded at high speed, forcing his car into a 360° spin before resting on a tyre wall. He managed his fourth victory of the year at Hungary, and followed up the result with a second place in Belgium. Häkkinen retired from the following race held in Italy, due to a spin while leading the race. He finished further with fifth place at the European Grand Prix, and achieved a podium finish with third place in Malaysia. At the season finale held in Japan, Häkkinen took victory, which ensured he took enough points to win the 1999 World Championship, with 76 points, ahead of nearest rival Eddie Irvine. In November, Häkkinen was ranked seventh in the Reuters Sports Personality of the Year Poll scoring 46 out of a possible 260 points. He was also awarded his second consecutive Autosport International Racing Driver Award for 1999. In November, Häkkinen was announced as one of the seven men shortlisted for the Finnish Sports Personality of the Year. At the awards ceremony on 28 December, Häkkinen was awarded second place behind skier Mika Myllylä.

==== 2000: Runner-up to Schumacher ====
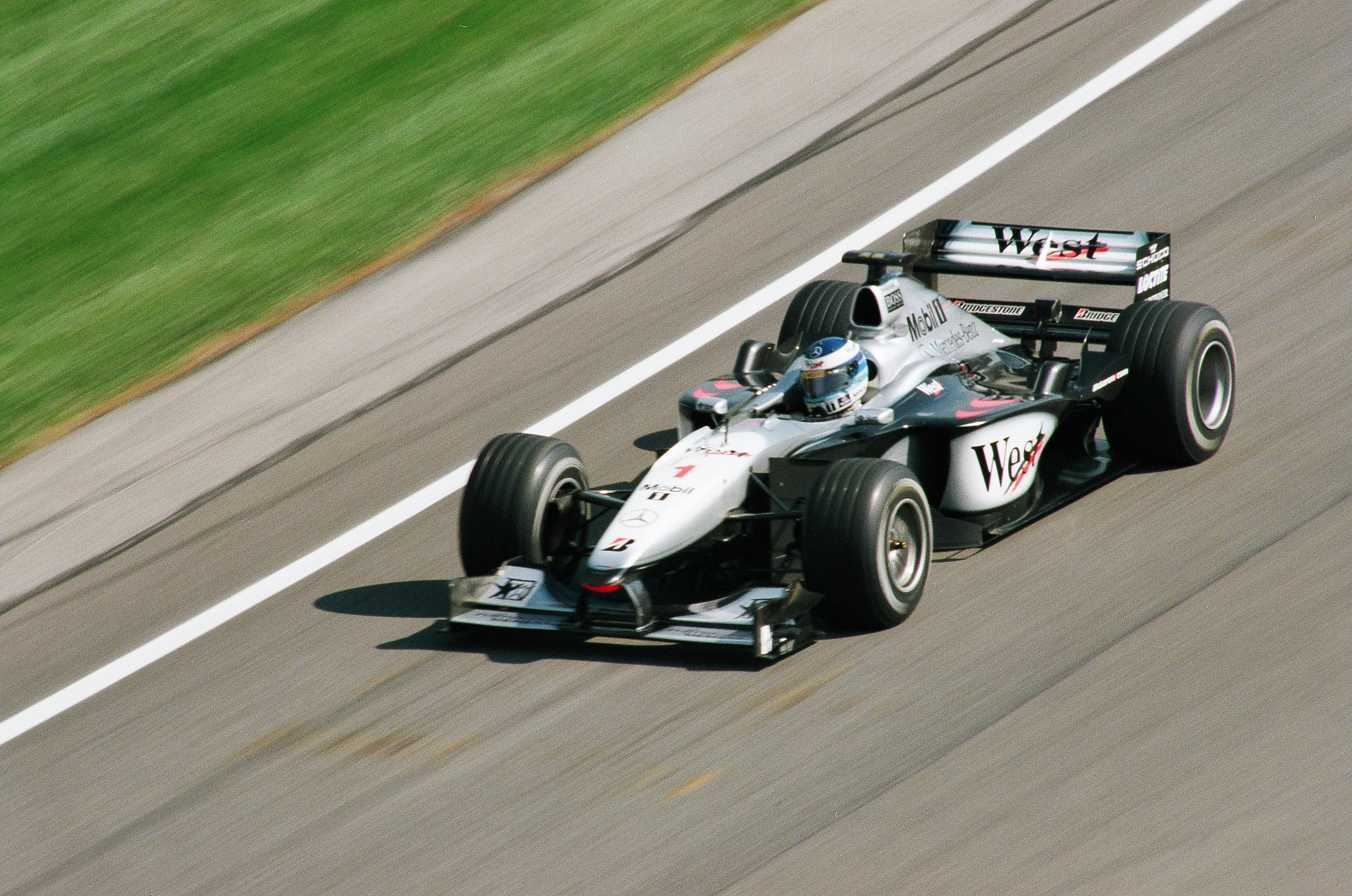
Häkkinen driving for McLaren at the 2000 United States Grand Prix, where an engine problem cost him the title lead to eventual champion Michael Schumacher

For 2000, Häkkinen set himself new limits along with physical and psychological preparations for the upcoming season. He also believed that he along with Schumacher and Coulthard would be the key drivers of 2000. He endured a bad start: at the opening round in Australia, both McLaren cars retired with engine failure after completing less than half of the race distance; and in the following race in Brazil, Häkkinen was forced into retirement when his car's oil pressure became problematic. However, this marked a turning point as Häkkinen took consecutive second-place finishes in the next two rounds, and later reached his first victory of the season in Spain.

Häkkinen finished in second position at the European Grand Prix, having traded the lead position with Schumacher throughout the race. He followed up the result by taking sixth place at Monaco, fourth in Canada and a podium finish with second position in France. The day after the French Grand Prix, it was announced that Häkkinen would remain at McLaren for 2001. Häkkinen won the following race held in Austria, although his team were stripped of constructors' points due to a missing seal on the electronic control unit in Häkkinen's car. He took another podium finish with a second place in Germany, and later had another victory at the Hungarian Grand Prix where he took the lead of the World Drivers' Championship from Schumacher. Häkkinen raced to his second consecutive victory in Belgium, which included a simultaneous pass on Schumacher and Ricardo Zonta in the Kemmel straight. Häkkinen later took second place in Italy, and retired with an engine failure in the United States. He rounded off the year with a second place in Japan where he conceded the World Championship to Schumacher, and held fourth position in the season closing race held in Malaysia.

==== 2001: Final season ====
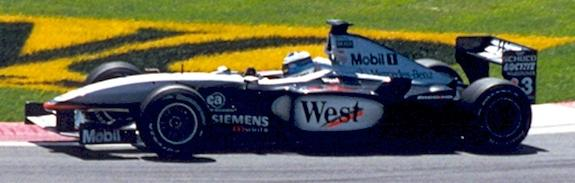
Häkkinen driving for McLaren at the 2001 Canadian Grand Prix, where he reached his first podium finish of 2001

For 2001, Häkkinen pledged to make a challenge for the World Championship, citing inspiration from the birth of his son Hugo. He also added that he was under less pressure to compete, saying that results over the previous year increased his desire to win. The season started badly for Häkkinen, as he was forced into retirement in the opening round held in Australia due to a failure with his car's suspension resulting in his car spinning violently into a tyre barrier. The McLaren cars were off the pace in Malaysia, with Häkkinen managing to end at the 6th place. He retired from the following race in Brazil when his car stalled on the starting grid, Further points came at the San Marino Grand Prix. At the Spanish Grand Prix, Häkkinen looked on course to win his first victory of the season, until the final lap of the race, when his car was hampered with a clutch failure and was classified ninth.

He suffered further consecutive retirements in Austria where he stalled his car on the starting grid, and Monaco where his car's steering failed after fifteen laps of the race. At the following race held in Canada, Häkkinen took his first podium of the season with a third-place finish. He finished sixth at the European Grand Prix, and was unable to start the French Grand Prix as his car developed a gearbox problem. However, this marked a brief turning point for Häkkinen as he gained a victory in the British Grand Prix. He was forced into another retirement in Germany when his engine failed, later managing fifth position in Hungary and fourth place in Belgium.

Before the Italian Grand Prix, Häkkinen announced that he would be on a sabbatical for the 2002 season, citing the reason to spend more time with his family. His seat was taken by fellow countryman Kimi Räikkönen in 2002. Häkkinen later stated that fear after crashes during practice for the 1995 Australian Grand Prix and the 2001 Australian Grand Prix as well as a loss of a desire to compete for race victories were factors. He was forced into another retirement during the race due to a gearbox issue. He raced to his final victory of his career in the United States despite incurring a grid penalty, and ended the season with a fourth-place finish in Japan. Häkkinen finished the season fifth in the Drivers' Championship, with 37 points.

== Post-Formula One (2002–2004) ==
In July 2002, nine months into his sabbatical, Häkkinen announced that he would be retiring from Formula One. It was later revealed that Häkkinen approached McLaren team principal Ron Dennis during the 2001 Monaco Grand Prix and agreed a sabbatical, then returned to Monaco the following year to discuss and agree full-time retirement with Dennis. In October, Häkkinen made his first appearance as a commentator for pay-for-view channel Canal Digital at the United States Grand Prix.

In December 2002, it was announced that Häkkinen would be participating in the Finnish Rally Championship driving a Mitsubishi Lancer Evolution WRC2 with his co-driver Arto Kapanen. He also stated that he would not move full-time into rallying and learn about driver control, although he later stated he would enter more rally events if he finished within the top two. Making his debut in the Arctic Rally, Häkkinen was delayed by four minutes as his team changed a tyre and eventually finished 30th. He once again entered the event in 2004 driving a Toyota Corolla with co-driver Risto Pietiläinen and finished seventh.

During 2004, rumors circulated that Häkkinen was making a possible return to Formula One to fill in the vacant Williams seat left by Juan Pablo Montoya. In May, McLaren team principal Ron Dennis dismissed the rumors, stating that Häkkinen was not prepared for a comeback. Häkkinen held talks with BAR and Williams and later decided against returning to Formula One saying in 2005: "It's impossible to think that I would race a Formula One car again because as time passes my reactions become slower and my eyesight gets worse – that's life".

== Deutsche Tourenwagen Masters ==
=== 2005 ===
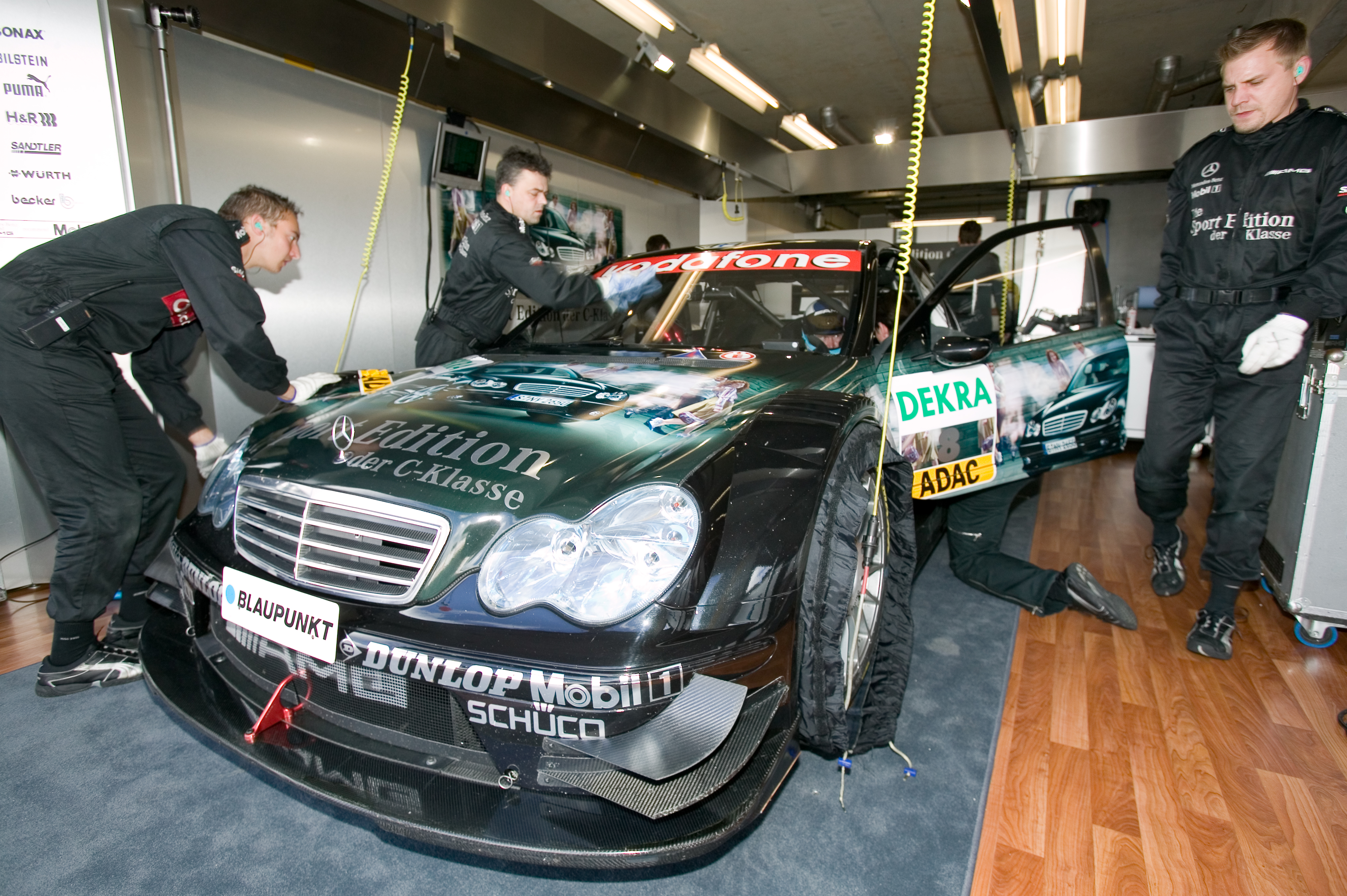
Häkkinen drove for the HWA team in the 2005 season.

On 6 November 2004, it was announced that Häkkinen would make his debut in the Deutsche Tourenwagen Masters (DTM) series for the HWA Team in the 2005 season. He was partnered by Gary Paffett, Jean Alesi and Bernd Schneider. Häkkinen had previous experience of driving touring cars in July 2001 at the Brno Circuit alongside Schneider. In January, Häkkinen once again participated in the Arctic Rally driving a Toyota Corolla with co-driver Risto Pietiläinen. Häkkinen retired when he slid off the road on the eleventh stage.

Häkkinen's debut DTM season started well: He secured eighth position in his first race at the Hockenheimring; and in the following race at the EuroSpeedway Lausitz, held his first podium in his DTM career. Two weeks later at Spa-Francorchamps, Häkkinen qualified on pole position and later took his first DTM win after only three starts. Despite the early success, he did not score points in the next three races which included consecutive retirements at Oschersleben and the Norisring. He later scored a further points position at the race held at the Nürburgring, before further consecutive 12th-place finishes in the next two races. Häkkinen ended the 2005 season by taking a second-place finish at Istanbul Park and finished outside of the points scoring positions with 15th place at Hockenheim. Häkkinen finished the season fifth in the Drivers' Championship, with 30 points.

=== 2006 ===
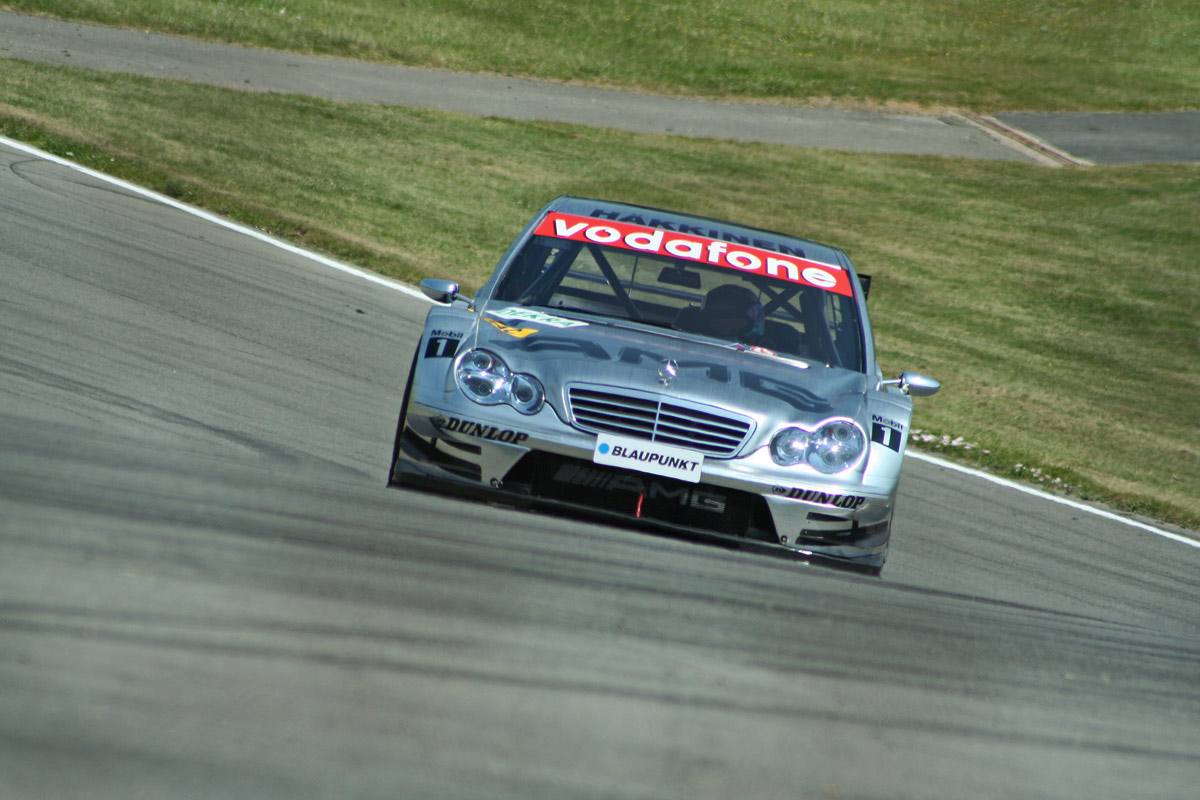
Häkkinen driving for HWA at Brands Hatch in 2006

On 15 November 2005, it was announced that Häkkinen would remain with HWA for the 2006 season, and was partnered by Alesi, Spengler and Jamie Green. For the upcoming season, Häkkinen set his target of winning the championship, although he believed the competition from Audi would make the title challenge difficult. Outside of DTM, Häkkinen participated in his fourth Arctic Rally, driving a Mitsubishi Lancer Evolution VII with co-driver Risto Pietiläinen. He finished 36th overall.

Häkkinen's season got off well: At the opening race held at Hockenheim, he finished in fourth position; and in the following race held at the EuroSpeedway Lausitz, he drove to his first podium of the season with third place. Häkkinen did not score points in the next two consecutive races, although he later held another podium position with third place at the Norisring. In the next three races, he was unable to score more points, although he had another podium position at the Bugatti Circuit. Häkkinen concluded his season with a retirement at the Hockenheimring when his car's diffuser became damaged. Häkkinen ended the year sixth in the Drivers' Championship, scoring 25 points.

In November, Häkkinen tested a McLaren MP4-21 for one day at the Circuit de Catalunya where he completed 79 laps. To prepare himself, Häkkinen spent time at the McLaren Technology Centre to acquaint himself with Formula One's revised regulations. In a 2017 retrospective interview Häkkinen revealed that he had been in advanced talks with McLaren for a return in the 2007 season. He had however been frustrated by problems with McLaren's car in the test, which had reminded him of the reasons why he had taken the sabbatical in the first place, so the plans had collapsed.

=== 2007 ===
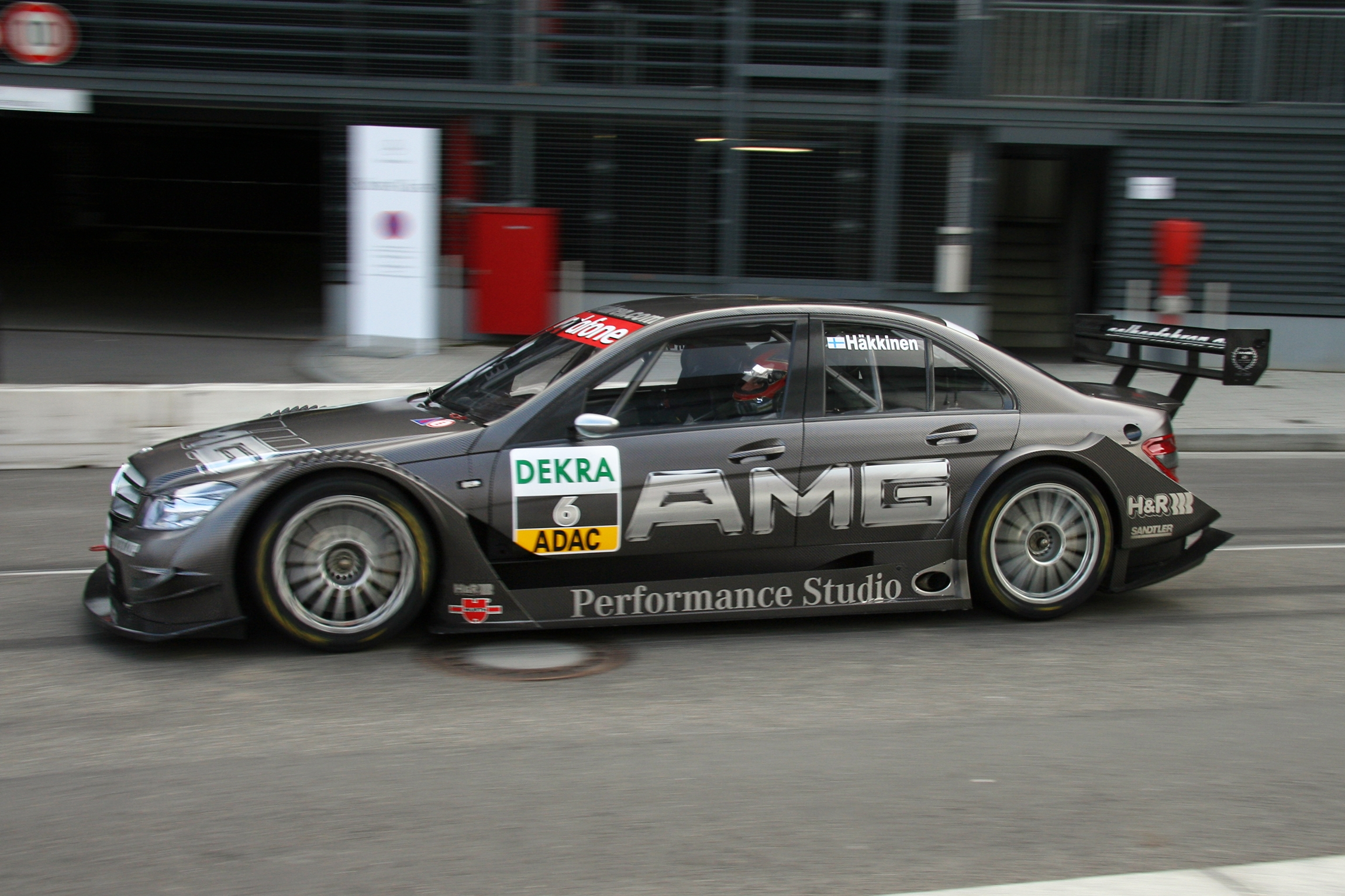
Häkkinen driving Mercedes Stars and Cars in 2007

On 28 January 2007, it was announced that Häkkinen would remain in DTM for the 2007 season for HWA, and was partnered by Spengler, Green and Schneidler. Häkkinen stated that during 2006, his team's potential was not realised and aimed during 2007 to improve on his results. He started the season by earning consecutive finishes in the first two races, albeit outside of the points scoring positions. At the third race of the season held at EuroSpeedway Lausitz, Häkkinen won his first race of the season although only half points were awarded due to errors made by race organisers, resulting in the official race result remaining provisional. He held pole for the following race at Brands Hatch where he finished in fourth position, and followed the result with a ninth-place finish at the Norisring.

Häkkinen had his second victory of the season at Mugello, after starting from 15th position. He later managed 7th place at Zandvoort and later finished with a tenth-place finish at the Nürburgring. At the race held at the Circuit de Catalunya, Häkkinen was involved in a collision with Audi driver Martin Tomczyk. Häkkinen was penalised with a €20,000 fine, received a ten-place grid penalty for the next round and was disqualified from the race. He finished the season with a 17th-place finish at the Hockenheimring. Häkkinen finished the season seventh place in the Championship, with 22 points.

== Retirement (2008–present) ==
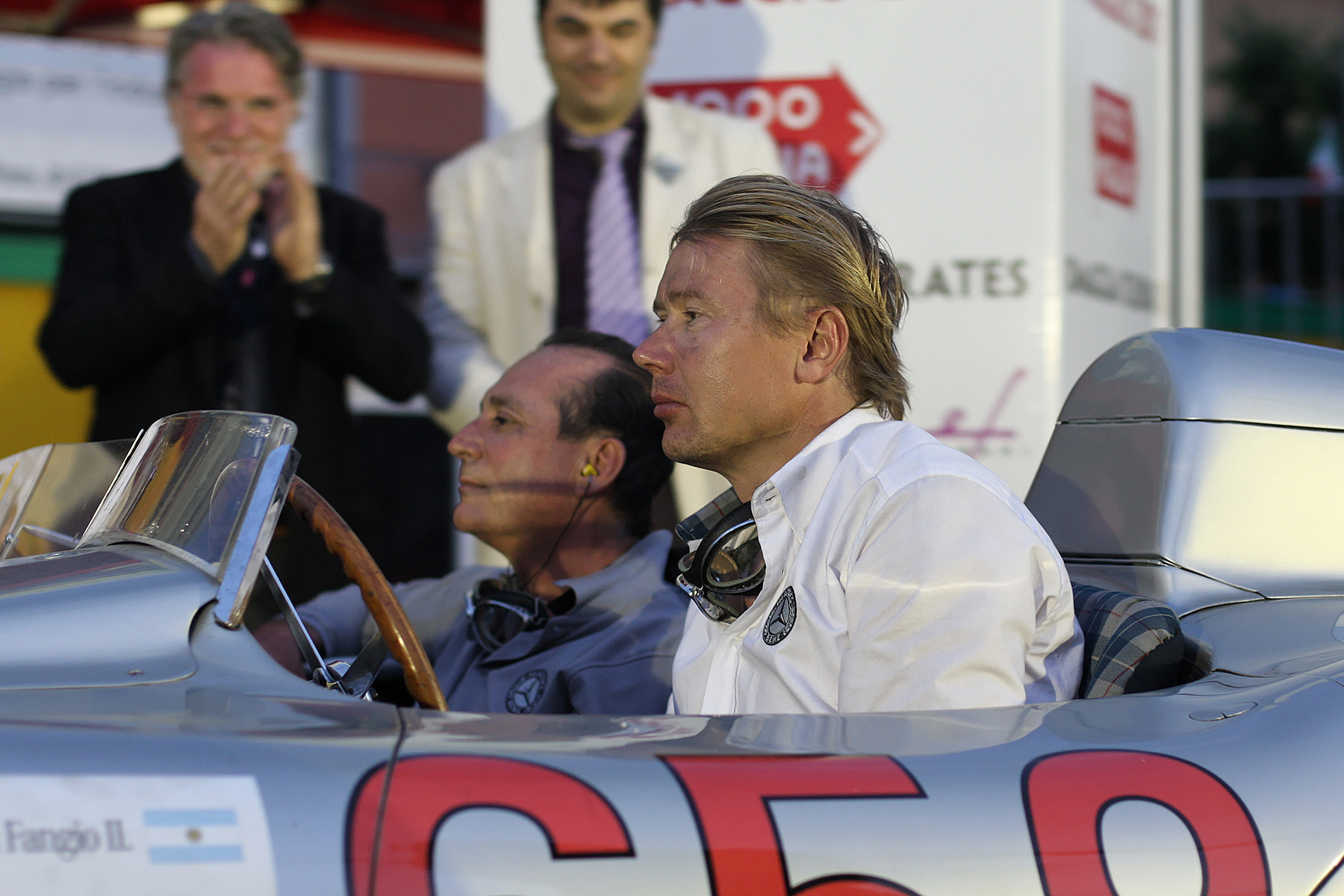
Häkkinen and Juan Manuel Fangio II at 2011 Mille Miglia

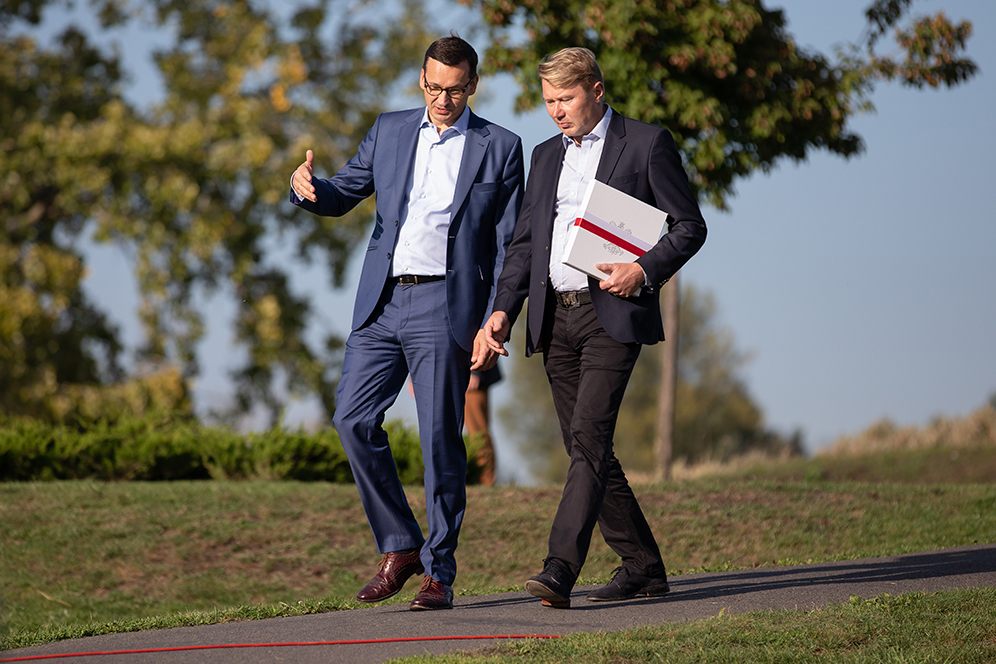
Polish Prime Minister Mateusz Morawiecki with Häkkinen in 2018

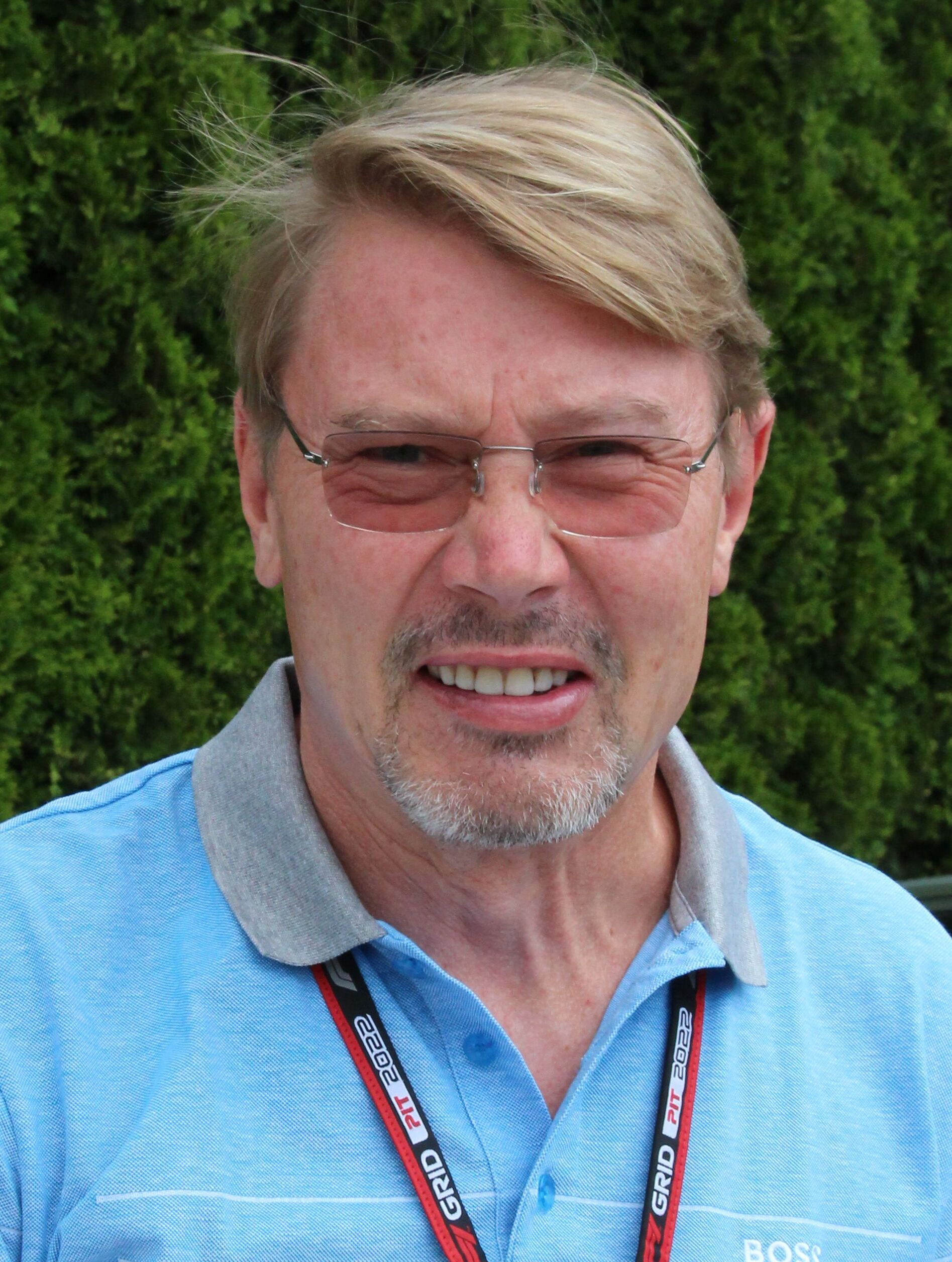
Häkkinen at the 2022 Austrian Grand Prix

Häkkinen announced his retirement from competitive motorsport in November 2007. He was quoted as saying that the decision "was not an easy one", but added that "racing is still in my blood and this decision does not mean that this will prevent me from racing for pleasure".

In November 2008, it was announced that Häkkinen would start a new career in driver management and would work alongside Didier Coton in his firm Aces Associate Group. Häkkinen contested his fifth Arctic Rally event in January 2009 driving a Mitsubishi Lancer Evolution IX alongside co-driver Ilkka Kivimäki and finished 19th overall. Häkkinen made his debut in sports cars when Team AMG China entered a Mercedes-Benz SLS AMG in November 2011 to participate in the Intercontinental Le Mans Cup at the 6 Hours of Zhuhai race alongside Lance David Arnold and Cheng Congfu. During the event, the team retired after completing two hours. In October 2013, Häkkinen participated in the GT Asia series for the two races held at the Zhuhai International Circuit, driving a Mercedes-Benz SLS AMG 300 alongside co-driver Matthew Solomon. Häkkinen drove to victory in the first race after starting from sixth position. The victory resulted in a 15-second handicap during his mandatory pitstop for his second race and finished in fourth position.

On 16 March 2017, McLaren announced that Häkkinen had rejoined the team as partner ambassador. In November 2021, Häkkinen helped McLaren IndyCar driver Pato O'Ward prepare for his test of the McLaren MCL35M by familiarizing O'Ward on his championship winning MP4/13 around Laguna Seca.

In August 2019, Häkkinen raced in the 2019 Suzuka 10 Hours, the fourth round of the 2019 Intercontinental GT Challenge driving a McLaren 720S GT3 alongside two-time Super Formula champion Hiroaki Ishiura and Japanese Formula 3 racer Katsuaki Kubota, with Planex Smacam Racing.

Häkkinen and Emma Kimiläinen competed together for Team Finland at the Race of Champions on 5–6 February 2022. He is set to again compete in the race in 2023 alongside Formula One driver Valtteri Bottas, who was originally going to be his partner at the 2022 edition before backing out.

In December 2021, Häkkinen was announced as a Formula One analyst for the sports broadcaster Viaplay. From 2022 onwards, Häkkinen became part of a permanent team of analysts on-site at the Grands Prix. In the team of analysts, Häkkinen is accompanied by David Coulthard and Jos Verstappen.

== Driving style and personality ==
Journalist Peter Windsor analysed Häkkinen's driving style for an article in F1 Racing magazine, writing that Häkkinen was an "oversteering" driver, which made him faster on slippery surfaces and meant that "tail-happy" cars suited him. This allowed him to perform better at circuits that have medium-speed corners. During his karting career, Häkkinen developed the habit of using the brake pedal with his left foot. He reverted to using his right foot when he participated in DTM, but became uncomfortable with this style and switched again to left-foot braking in mid-2006. He became known as a "late season driver"; the second half of a season suited Häkkinen due to experience on these tracks and allowed time for his car to be altered towards his preference.

Häkkinen was criticized for being a poor car developer, though this may have been exaggerated due to his initial struggles with the English language early in his career. Adrian Newey, the designer of Häkkinen's championship-winning McLarens, described an instance of Häkkinen's approach to input on car development when Häkkinen kept telling him during the initial testing of the McLaren MP4/13 that the car was understeering. Newey subsequently adjusted the car to correct for understeer, but this only made it slower. After digging deeper into the test data and listening closely to what Häkkinen was describing Newey realized the car was not understeering but had rear end biased instability on corner entry that Häkkinen was compensating for with understeer. This experience proved crucial for Newey's relationship with Häkkinen during their run together at McLaren, as after that Newey no longer had issues understanding Häkkinen's inputs on car development. Newey said that Häkkinen's countryman, protege, and future McLaren driver Kimi Räikkönen had a similar approach to input on car development.

During his Formula One career, Häkkinen was regarded as taciturn, taking lengthy pauses before giving terse responses to questions. Since his retirement, he has often been voted among the greatest Formula One drivers. Michael Schumacher has stated that Häkkinen was the driver whom he gained the most satisfaction of racing against.

== Personal life ==
Häkkinen has lived in Monaco since 1991. He also owns properties in France and Finland. On 18 May 2008, his newly completed mansion in France was burned down after a light in one of his trophy cabinets short circuited. No injuries were reported, although Häkkinen's collection of Formula One trophies was destroyed.

Häkkinen married Erja Honkanen, a former TV journalist, in 1998. The couple have one son and one daughter. They divorced in 2008. Häkkinen also has two daughters and a son with his Czech second wife Markéta Remešová. One of his daughters, Ella, is a kart racer who competes in the Champions of the Future Academy Program. In November 2025, Ella was signed to the McLaren Driver Development Programme.

Häkkinen joined Johnnie Walker as Global Responsible Drinking Ambassador for Diageo in September 2006, campaigning for the message of responsible drinking. He also led the organisation's Join the Pact campaign to spread consumer commitments for the prevention of drunk driving. He is also brand ambassador for Mercedes-Benz and UBS. In 2016, he became an official brand ambassador for Nokian Tyres.

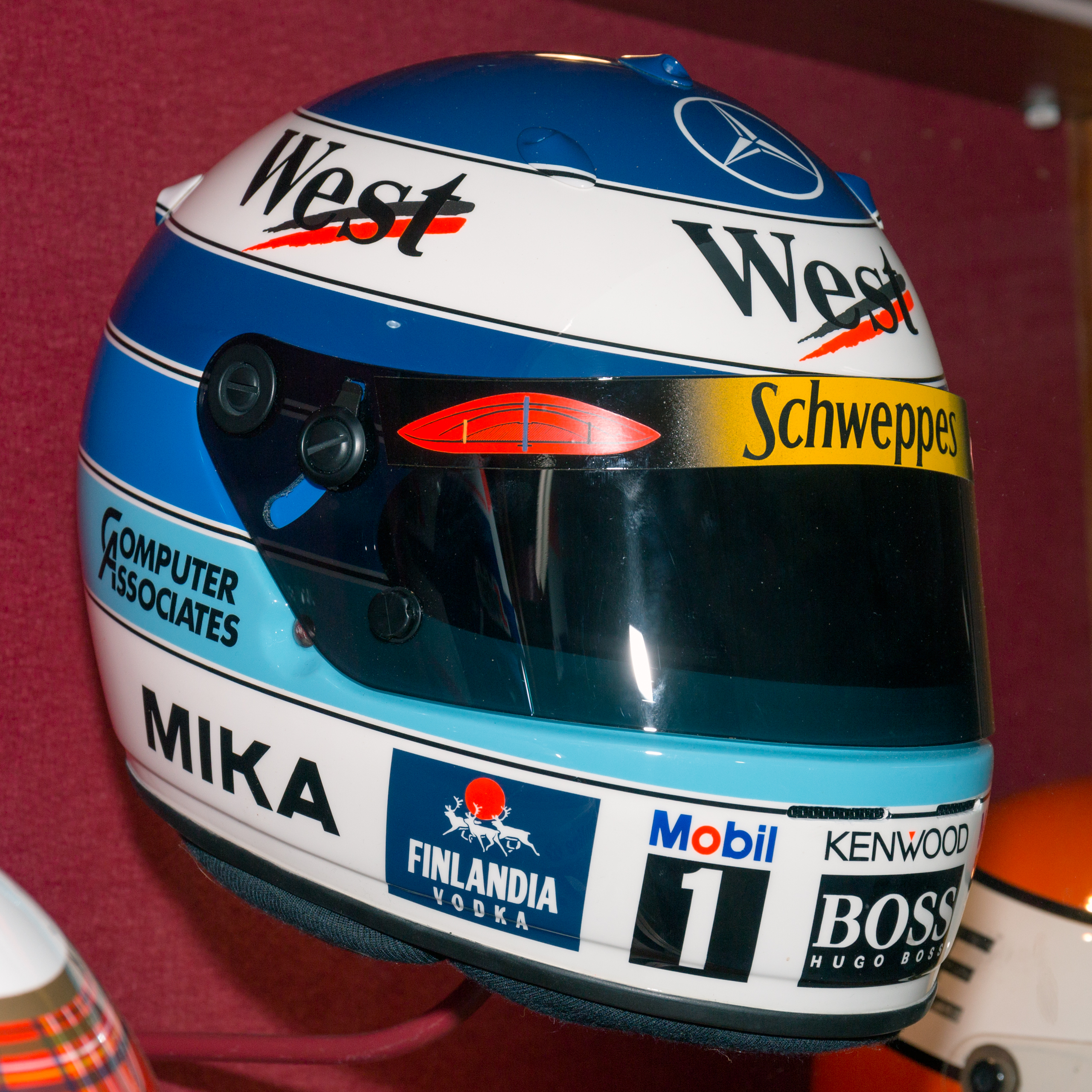
Häkkinen's 1998 helmet

== Karting record ==
=== Karting career summary ===
Season	Series	Team	Position
1979	Lappland Cup — Formula Mini		3rd
1980	Finnish Championship Cup — Formula Mini		4th
1981	Finnish Championship Cup — Formula Mini		1st
1982	Finnish Championship Cup — Formula Mini		2nd
1982	Ronnie Peterson Memorial — Formula Mini		1st
1983	Finnish Championship — Formula Nordic		1st
1983	Nordic Championship — Formula Nordic		6th
1984	Finnish Championship — Formula Nordic		1st
1985	Finnish Championship — Formula A		1st
1985	Nordic Championship — Formula A		2nd
1986	Finnish Championship — Formula A		1st

== Racing record ==
=== Career summary ===
Season	Series	Team name	Races	Wins	Poles	F/Laps	Podiums	Points	Position
1987	Nordic Formula Ford	Reynard	15	9	?	?	?	40	**1st**
1987	Formula Ford EuroCup 1600		2	1	?	?	1	20	7th
1988	GM Vauxhall-Lotus Challenge	Dragon	10	3	4	7	7	127	**2nd**
1988	Opel-Lotus Euroseries	Dragon	10	4	2	6	6	126	**1st**
1989	British Formula 3 Championship	Dragon	17	0	2	2	?	18	7th
1989	Cellnet Formula Three SuperPrix	WSR	1	1	1	1	1	N/A	**1st**
1989	Macau Grand Prix	Dragon	1	0	0	0	0	N/A	NC
1989	French Formula 3 Championship	Dragon	1	0	0	1	0	N/A	NC
1990	British Formula 3 Championship	WSR	17	10	11	10	15	121	**1st**
1990	Italian Formula 3 Championship	WSR	1	1	0	?	1	9	?
1990	German Formula 3 Championship	WSR	1	1	1	1	1	20	14th
1990	Macau Grand Prix	Theodore Racing	1	0	1	0	0	N/A	NC
1990	Fuji Formula Three Race		1	0	0	0	0	N/A	NC
1991	Formula One	Team Lotus	15	0	0	0	0	2	16th
1992	Formula One	Team Lotus	15	0	0	0	0	11	8th
1993	Formula One	Marlboro McLaren	3	0	0	0	1	4	15th
1993	Porsche Supercup	Porsche AG	2	2	2	0	2	0	0
1994	Formula One	Marlboro McLaren Peugeot	15	0	0	0	6	26	4th
1995	Formula One	Marlboro McLaren Mercedes	15	0	0	0	2	17	7th
1996	Formula One	Marlboro McLaren Mercedes	16	0	0	0	4	31	5th
1997	Formula One	West McLaren Mercedes	17	1	1	1	3	27	6th
1998	Formula One	West McLaren Mercedes	16	8	9	6	11	100	**1st**
1999	Formula One	West McLaren Mercedes	16	5	11	6	10	76	**1st**
2000	Formula One	West McLaren Mercedes	17	4	5	9	11	89	**2nd**
2001	Formula One	West McLaren Mercedes	17	2	0	3	3	37	5th
2005	Deutsche Tourenwagen Masters	AMG-Mercedes	11	1	1	3	3	30	5th
2006	Deutsche Tourenwagen Masters	HWA-Mercedes	10	0	0	2	3	25	6th
2007	Deutsche Tourenwagen Masters	HWA-Mercedes	10	2	2	0	2	22	8th
2011	Intercontinental Le Mans Cup	Team AMG	1	0	0	0	0	0	NC
2013	GT Asia Series - GT3	Erebus Motorsport	2	1	0	1	1	N/A	NC†
2019	Intercontinental GT Challenge	Planex Smacam Racing	1	0	0	0	0	0	NC

=== Complete British Formula Three Championship results ===
(key) (Races in bold indicate pole position) (Races in italics indicate fastest lap)

Year	Entrant	Engine	Class	1	2	3	4	5	6	7	8	9	10	11	12	13	14	15	16	17	DC	Pts
1989	Dragon	Toyota	A	THR; 15	DON; C	SIL; DSQ	**BRH**; 3	SIL; Ret	**BRH**; 2	THR; 12	SIL; 18	DON; 8	SIL; 5	SNE; 5	OUL; 6	SIL; 10	BRH; 6	DON; Ret	SIL; 11	THR; 12	7th	18
1990	West Surrey Racing	Mugen	A	**DON**; 1	**SIL**; 3	**THR**; 1	**BRH**; 1	SIL; 2	**BRH**; 2	THR; 2	**SIL**; Ret	DON; 6	SIL; 2	SNE; 1	**OUL**; 1	**SIL**; 1	**BRH**; 1	**DON**; 1	THR; 2	**SIL**; 1	**1st**	**121**

=== Complete Formula One results ===
(key) (Races in bold indicate pole position, races in italics indicate fastest lap)

Year	Team	Chassis	Engine	1	2	3	4	5	6	7	8	9	10	11	12	13	14	15	16	17	WDC	Points
1991	Team Lotus	Lotus 102B	Judd EV 3.5 V8	USA; Ret	BRA; 9	SMR; 5	MON; Ret	CAN; Ret	MEX; 9	FRA; DNQ	GBR; 12	GER; Ret	HUN; 14	BEL; Ret	ITA; 14	POR; 14	ESP; Ret	JPN; Ret	AUS; 19		16th	2
1992	Team Lotus	Lotus 102D	Ford HBA5/HBA6 3.5 V8	RSA; 9	MEX; 6	BRA; 10	ESP; Ret	SMR; DNQ													8th	11
1992	Team Lotus	Lotus 107	Ford HBA5/HBA6 3.5 V8						MON; Ret	CAN; Ret	FRA; 4	GBR; 6	GER; Ret	HUN; 4	BEL; 6	ITA; Ret	POR; 5	JPN; Ret	AUS; 7		8th	11
1993	Marlboro McLaren	McLaren MP4/8	Ford HBD7 3.5 V8	RSA	BRA	EUR	SMR	ESP	MON	CAN	FRA	GBR	GER	HUN	BEL	ITA	POR; Ret	JPN; 3	AUS; Ret		15th	4
1994	Marlboro McLaren Peugeot	McLaren MP4/9	Peugeot A6 3.5 V10	BRA; Ret	PAC; Ret	SMR; 3	MON; Ret	ESP; Ret	CAN; Ret	FRA; Ret	GBR; 3	GER; Ret	HUN	BEL; 2	ITA; 3	POR; 3	EUR; 3	JPN; 7	AUS; 12^{†}		4th	26
1995	Marlboro McLaren Mercedes	McLaren MP4/10	Mercedes-Benz FO 110 3.0 V10	BRA; 4	ARG; Ret	SMR; 5	ESP; Ret	MON; Ret	CAN; Ret												7th	17
1995	Marlboro McLaren Mercedes	McLaren MP4/10B	Mercedes-Benz FO 110 3.0 V10							FRA; 7	GBR; Ret	GER; Ret	HUN; Ret	BEL; Ret	ITA; 2			PAC	JPN; 2	AUS; DNS	7th	17
1995	Marlboro McLaren Mercedes	McLaren MP4/10C	Mercedes-Benz FO 110 3.0 V10													POR; Ret	EUR; 8				7th	17
1996	Marlboro McLaren Mercedes	McLaren MP4/11	Mercedes-Benz FO 110/3 3.0 V10	AUS; 5	BRA; 4	ARG; Ret	EUR; 8	SMR; 8^{†}	MON; 6^{†}	ESP; 5	CAN; 5	FRA; 5									5th	31
1996	Marlboro McLaren Mercedes	McLaren MP4/11B	Mercedes-Benz FO 110/3 3.0 V10										GBR; 3	GER; Ret	HUN; 4	BEL; 3	ITA; 3	POR; Ret	JPN; 3		5th	31
1997	West McLaren Mercedes	McLaren MP4/12	Mercedes-Benz FO 110E 3.0 V10	AUS; 3	BRA; 4	ARG; 5	SMR; 6	MON; Ret	ESP; 7	CAN; Ret											6th	27
1997	West McLaren Mercedes	McLaren MP4/12	Mercedes-Benz FO 110F 3.0 V10								FRA; Ret	GBR; Ret	GER; 3	HUN; Ret	BEL; DSQ	ITA; 9	AUT; Ret	**LUX**; Ret	JPN; 4	EUR; 1	6th	27
1998	West McLaren Mercedes	McLaren MP4/13	Mercedes-Benz FO 110G 3.0 V10	**AUS**; 1	**BRA**; 1	ARG; 2	SMR; Ret	**ESP**; 1	**MON**; 1	CAN; Ret	**FRA**; 3	**GBR**; 2	AUT; 1	**GER**; 1	**HUN**; 6	**BEL**; Ret	ITA; 4	LUX; 1	JPN; 1		**1st**	**100**
1999	West McLaren Mercedes	McLaren MP4/14	Mercedes-Benz FO 110H 3.0 V10	**AUS**; Ret	**BRA**; 1	**SMR**; Ret	**MON**; 3	**ESP**; 1	CAN; 1	FRA; 2	**GBR**; Ret	**AUT**; 3	**GER**; Ret	**HUN**; 1	**BEL**; 2	**ITA**; Ret	EUR; 5	MAL; 3	JPN; 1		**1st**	**76**
2000	West McLaren Mercedes	McLaren MP4/15	Mercedes-Benz FO 110J 3.0 V10	**AUS**; Ret	**BRA**; Ret	**SMR**; 2	GBR; 2	ESP; 1	EUR; 2	MON; 6	CAN; 4	FRA; 2	**AUT**; 1	GER; 2	HUN; 1	**BEL**; 1	ITA; 2	USA; Ret	JPN; 2	MAL; 4	**2nd**	**89**
2001	West McLaren Mercedes	McLaren MP4-16	Mercedes-Benz FO 110K 3.0 V10	AUS; Ret	MAL; 6	BRA; Ret	SMR; 4	ESP; 9^{†}	AUT; Ret	MON; Ret	CAN; 3	EUR; 6	FRA; DNS	GBR; 1	GER; Ret	HUN; 5	BEL; 4	ITA; Ret	USA; 1	JPN; 4	5th	37

^{†} Did not finish, but was classified as he had completed more than 90% of the race distance.

=== Complete DTM results ===
(key) (Races in bold indicate pole position) (Races in italics indicate fastest lap)

Year	Team	Car	1	2	3	4	5	6	7	8	9	10	11	Pos.	Pts
2005	HWA Team	AMG-Mercedes C-Klasse 2005	HOC; 8	LAU; 3	**SPA**; 1	BRN; 13	OSC; Ret	NOR; Ret	NÜR; 4	ZAN; 12	LAU; 12	IST; 2	HOC; 15	5th	30
2006	HWA Team	AMG-Mercedes C-Klasse 2006	HOC; 4	LAU; 3	OSC; 9	BRH; 11	NOR; 3	NÜR; 12	ZAN; 11	CAT; 11	BUG; 2	HOC; Ret		6th	25
2007	HWA Team	AMG-Mercedes C-Klasse 2007	HOC; 10	**OSC**; 17	LAU; 1^{‡}	**BRH**; 4	NOR; 9	MUG; 1	ZAN; 7	NÜR; 10	CAT; DSQ	HOC; 17		8th	22

^{‡} Half points were awarded in the race due to several errors made by the race officials.

== Notes ==
Sporting positions
Preceded by David Brabham	British Formula Three Champion; 1990	Succeeded by Rubens Barrichello
Preceded by Jacques Villeneuve	Formula One World Champion; 1998–1999	Succeeded by Michael Schumacher
