= Mercedes-Benz FO engine =

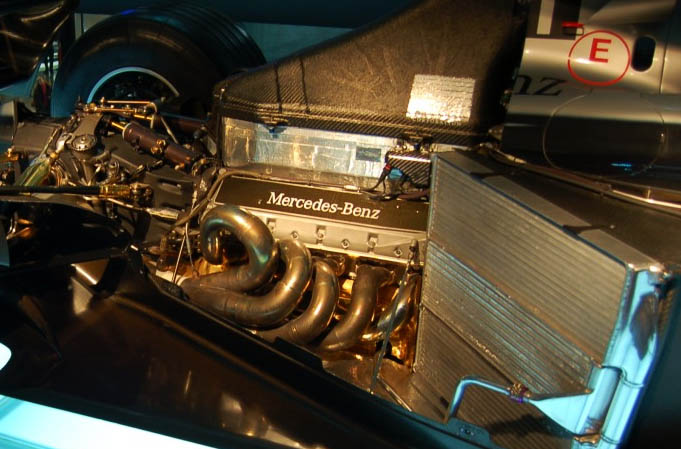

Overview
- Manufacturer: Ilmor-Mercedes (1993-2005) (Germany) Mercedes (2006-2013)
- Designer: Mario Illien
- Production: 1993–2013

Layout
- Configuration: 72°-90° V10; 90° V8
- Displacement: 3.5 L (3,499 cc); 3.0 L (2,998 cc); 2.4 L (2,398 cc)
- Cylinder bore: 86.6 mm (3.4 in); 92.2 mm (3.6 in); 93.5 mm (3.7 in); 95 mm (3.7 in); 98 mm (3.9 in)
- Piston stroke: 59.4 mm (2.3 in); 52.4 mm (2.1 in); 43.67 mm (1.7 in); 42.3 mm (1.7 in); 39.75 mm (1.6 in)

Combustion
- Fuel system: Electronic multi-point indirect fuel injection
- Fuel type: Gasoline
- Cooling system: Water-cooled

Output
- Power output: 690–930 hp (515–694 kW; 700–943 PS)
- Torque output: 220–300 lb⋅ft (298–407 N⋅m)

Dimensions
- Length: 590 mm (23 in)
- Width: 485 mm (19.1 in)
- Height: 472 mm (18.6 in)
- Dry weight: 95–124 kg (209.4–273.4 lb)

Chronology
- Successor: Mercedes-Benz V6 turbo-hybrid

The Mercedes-Benz FO engine series (badged as a Sauber engine in 1993) is a family of naturally-aspirated V8 and V10 racing engines, designed, developed and produced by Mercedes, in partnership and collaboration with Ilmor, for Formula One, and used between 1993 and 2013. Over years of development, engine power managed to increase, from 690 @ 15,600 rpm, to later 930 hp @ 19,000 rpm. The customer engines were used by Sauber, McLaren, Brawn GP, and Force India.

== List of Formula One engines ==
Season	Name	Format	Peak power @ rpm Including hybrid system where applicable	Notes
1993	Sauber LH10 (Ilmor 2175A)	3,498.7 cc 72° V10	530 kW (710 hp) @ 13,300 rpm	Built by Ilmor
1994	Mercedes-Benz 2175B	3,498.5 cc 72° V10	537–563 kW (720–755 hp) @ 14,000 rpm	Built by Ilmor
1995	Mercedes-Benz FO 110	2,998.4 cc 75° V10	510 kW (690 hp) @ 15,600 rpm	Built by Ilmor
1996	Mercedes-Benz FO 110D	2,998.4 cc 75° V10	540 kW (720 hp) @ 15,700 rpm	Built by Ilmor
1997	Mercedes-Benz FO 110E	2,998.4 cc 75° V10	550–570 kW (740–760 hp) @ 15,800 rpm	Built by Ilmor
1998	Mercedes-Benz FO 110G	2,998.3 cc 72° V10	580–600 kW (780–800 hp) @ 16,100 rpm	Built by Ilmor
1999	Mercedes-Benz FO 110H	2,998.3 cc 72° V10	600 kW (810 hp) @ 16,200 rpm	Built by Ilmor
2000	Mercedes-Benz FO 110J	2,998.3 cc 72° V10	608 kW (815 hp) @ 17,800 rpm	Built by Ilmor
2001	Mercedes-Benz FO 110K	2,998.3 cc 72° V10	620 kW (830 hp) @ 17,800 rpm	Built by Ilmor
2002	Mercedes-Benz FO 110M	2,998.3 cc 90° V10	630 kW (845 hp) @ 18,300 rpm	Built by Ilmor
2003	Mercedes-Benz FO 110P	2,998.3 cc 90° V10	630 kW (850 hp) @ 18,500 rpm	Built by Ilmor
2004	Mercedes-Benz FO 110Q	2,998.3 cc 90° V10	650 kW (870 hp) @ 18,500 rpm	Built by Ilmor
2005	Mercedes-Benz FO 110R	2,998.3 cc 90° V10	710 kW (950 hp) @ 19,000 rpm	Built by Ilmor
2006	Mercedes-Benz FO 108S	2,398.7 cc 90° V8	560 kW (750 hp) @ 19,000 rpm	
2007	Mercedes-Benz FO 108T	2,398.7 cc 90° V8	600 kW (810 hp) @ 19,000 rpm	
2008	Mercedes-Benz FO 108V	2,398.7 cc 90° V8	560–600 kW (750–800 hp) @ 19,000 rpm	
2009	Mercedes-Benz FO 108W	2,398.7 cc 90° V8	560 kW (750 hp) + KERS @ 18,000 rpm	
2010	Mercedes-Benz FO 108X	2,398.7 cc 90° V8	560 kW (750 hp) @ 18,000 rpm	
2011	Mercedes-Benz FO 108Y	2,398.7 cc 90° V8	560 kW (750 hp) + KERS @ 18,000 rpm	
2012	Mercedes-Benz FO 108Z	2,398.7 cc 90° V8	560 kW (750 hp) + KERS @ 18,000 rpm	
2013	Mercedes-Benz FO 108F	2,398.7 cc 90° V8	560 kW (750 hp) + KERS @ 18,000 rpm	
Note: All engines built from 2009 onwards had a FIA-mandated 18,000 rpm limit.

== Applications ==
- Sauber C12
- Sauber C13
- McLaren MP4/10
- McLaren MP4/11
- McLaren MP4/12
- McLaren MP4/13
- McLaren MP4/14
- McLaren MP4/15
- McLaren MP4-16
- McLaren MP4-17
- McLaren MP4-18
- McLaren MP4-19
- McLaren MP4-20
- McLaren MP4-21
- McLaren MP4-22
- McLaren MP4-23
- McLaren MP4-24
- McLaren MP4-25
- McLaren MP4-26
- McLaren MP4-27
- McLaren MP4-28
- Brawn BGP 001
- Force India VJM02
- Force India VJM03
- Force India VJM04
- Force India VJM05
- Force India VJM06
- Mercedes MGP W01
- Mercedes MGP W02
- Mercedes F1 W03
- Mercedes F1 W04

== Mercedes-Benz FO engine World Championship results ==
- 2 World Constructors' Championships.
- 4 World Drivers' Championships.
- 87 race wins.
- 76 pole positions.
- 260 podium finishes.

== See also ==
- Renault RS engine
- Yamaha F1 engine
- Peugeot F1 engine
- Ilmor 2175 engine
- Hart 1035 engine
- Ferrari V10 engine
- Cosworth JD / VJ engine
- Petronas F1 engine
- Cosworth CR engine
- BMW E41 / P80 engine
- Honda V10 engine
