= Henri Durand =

French aerodynamic engineer

- Born: August 21, 1960 (age 66); Toulouse, France
- Education: Institut supérieur de l'aéronautique et de l'espace
- Employer: Toyota Racing Development
- Known for: Formula One cars aerodynamicst

Henri Durand (born 21 August 1960 in Toulouse) is a French race car engineer who worked for several Formula One teams from 1985 to 2004.

== Career ==
Durand was an alumnus from the Institut supérieur de l'aéronautique et de l'espace (ISAE) in Toulouse, France. He started his career at the Ligier team in 1985 as an aerodynamic technician. In 1987, he joined Ferrari and worked as an assistant to John Barnard. His first design was the Ferrari 639, which used a semi-automatic gearbox and active suspension. This car was later developed into the Ferrari 640, which was used in the 1989 season.

In June 1990, he moved to the McLaren team, working as head of aerodynamics development alongside Neil Oatley. Here, Durand oversees two engineering teams at once, namely the design team and the research and development team. He became one of the team's key figures in winning the constructors' title in the 1991 and 1998 seasons. He also supervised the construction of McLaren's new wind tunnel in Woking. Durand stayed with the team until 2000 when he decided to return to his native country to join Prost Grand Prix as technical director.

After Prost went bankrupt at the end of 2001, Durand joined Jordan in 2002 as the director of development. He left the team in 2004 to join the IRL team Red Bull Cheever Racing and later was appointed as head of Mecachrome USA.

In 2007, he joined Panther Racing, this time as technical director. He also worked as a consultant for Epsilon Euskadi.

In 2010, he joined Toyota Racing Development as a senior engineering manager.
