= Mario Illien =

Swiss motorsport engineer

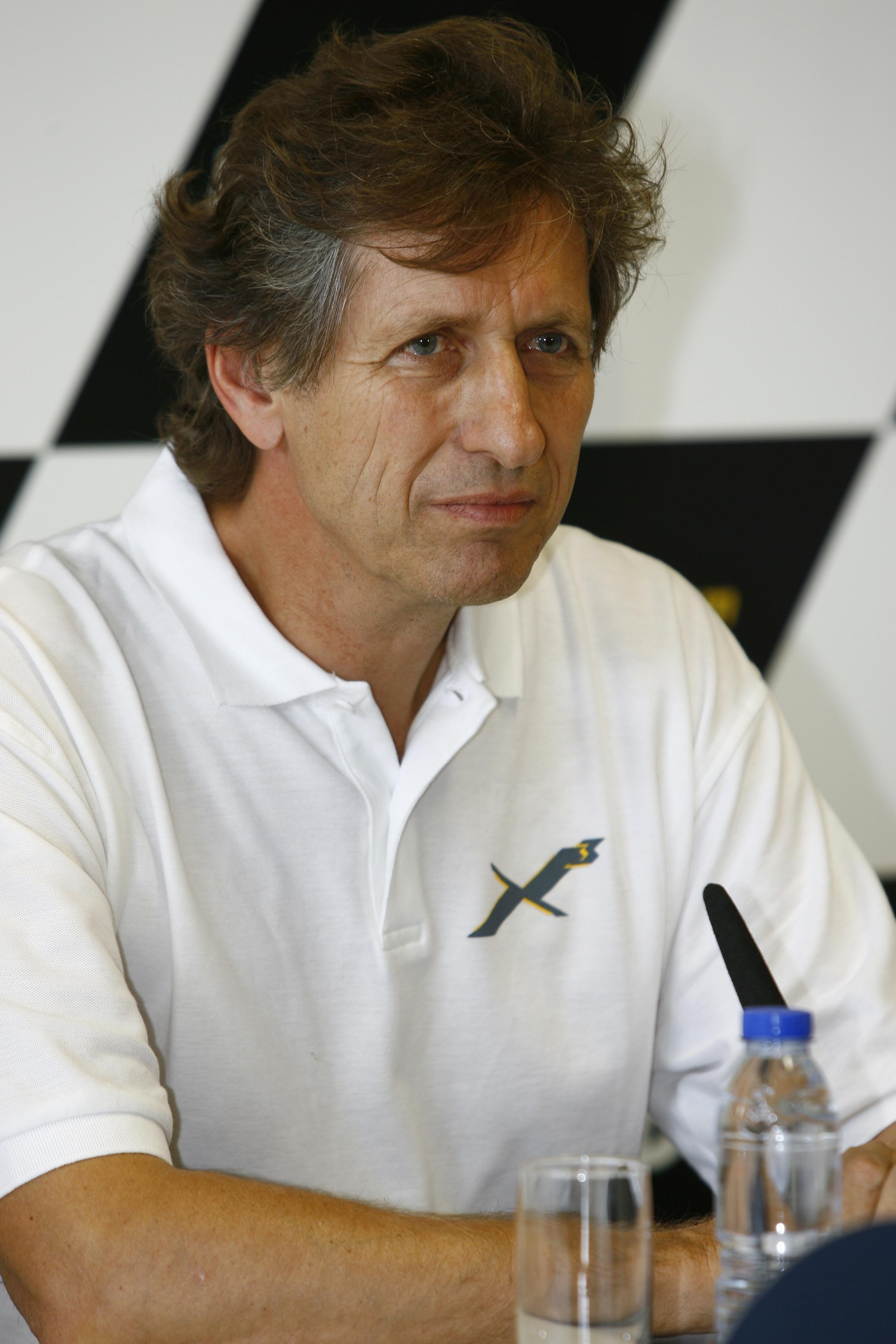
- Mario Illien at a Moto GP press conference in 2006
- Born: 2 August 1949 (age 76); Chur, Switzerland
- Occupation: Automotive engineer

Mario Illien (born 2 August 1949) is a Swiss engineer specialising in motorsport engine design and comes from Chur in the Canton of Graubünden, Switzerland. Despite living in a country in which motor racing was banned in 1955 (when Illien was six years old), he developed an interest in the sport during the 1960s while following the career of Jo Bonnier, a Swedish expatriate living in Switzerland.

== Education ==
Prior to embarking on his motorsport engineering career, Illien trained as a technical draughtsman. He later returned to education to study for a degree in mechanical engineering at Biel University’s School of Engineering . He graduated in 1976 and resumed his engineering career.

== Early career ==
Illien took his first motorsport-related job with his idol Bonnier in 1971, assisting with the preparation of an old customer McLaren chassis. When Bonnier was killed in a Lola T280 at Le Mans in 1972, Illien was hired by Fred Stalder to modify a four-cylinder Chrysler-Simca for use in a Le Mans prototype run by Stalder's Racing Organisation Course team. It was later used in Formula 2 in the mid-1970s, but by that time, Illien had left Stalder’s employ and enrolled at Biel.

After his graduation, his career moved away from motorsport and into military engineering. He joined Mowag (now owned by General Dynamics) in Kreuzlingen, designing diesel engines for armoured vehicles.

During his time at Mowag, Illien maintained his interest in motorsport. In 1979, at the age of 30, he gave up his job and moved to the UK to work in the design department of Cosworth Engineering in Northampton. He spent five years at Cosworth, contributing to the design and development of the company's racing engines, including the DFY V8. It was at Cosworth that Illien met Paul Morgan and the next stage of his career began.

== Ilmor Engineering ==
In 1983, Illien and Morgan were working on the Cosworth DFX for the Indycar World Series, but identified a demand for a more competitive alternative. The two men initiated their project in 1984 and contacted Roger Penske for assistance. Penske found them financial backing from General Motors and the four parties each took a 25% share in a new company – Ilmor Engineering – with Morgan looking after the manufacturing and commercial side of the business and Illien in charge of the design work. By 1986, Ilmor was competing in Indycars.

In 1989, it was decided that Ilmor should enter Formula 1, for which development of a 3.5L V10 got underway. Ilmor supplied Leyton House in 1991 and Tyrrell in 1992. By 1993, it had formed a partnership with Mercedes-Benz to supply Sauber in its debut season.

Ilmor continued as Mercedes' engine builder when it joined McLaren in 1995, which eventually brought Ilmor its first Grand Prix win in 1997, followed by the kind of championship-winning success that it had achieved in the United States.

Shortly after Morgan's death in 2001, Mercedes increased its managerial involvement, purchased a 55% share and renamed the company Mercedes-Ilmor. When Mercedes' parent company, DaimlerChrysler, purchased the remaining share in 2005, Illien and Penske retained the Special Projects division, which assisted Oldsmobile/Chevrolet in developing its IRL engines from 1997 until 2003 and Honda from 2003 until 2011. Illien took his company into Moto GP with the X3 project.

In early 2015, Illien assisted Red Bull Racing and Renault in improving their power unit.
