= Sauber C17 =

Formula One racing car

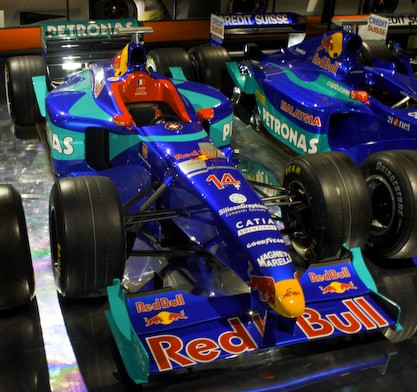
- Category: Formula One
- Constructor: Sauber
- Designers: Leo Ress (Technical Director); Osamu Goto (Engine Director); Ian Thomson (Head of Chassis Design); Rene Hilhorst (Head of Aerodynamics); Mike Jennings (Chief Aerodynamicist)
- Predecessor: Sauber C16
- Successor: Sauber C18

Technical specifications
- Chassis: carbon-fibre and honeycomb composite structure
- Suspension (front): double wishbones, pushrod, inboard spring/damper unit
- Suspension (rear): double wishbones, pushrod, inboard spring/damper unit
- Engine: Petronas SPE-01D (Ferrari O46/2), 75-degree V10
- Transmission: Sauber six-speed longitudinal sequential semi-automatic
- Fuel: Shell
- Lubricants: Shell
- Tyres: Goodyear

Competition history
- Notable entrants: Red Bull Sauber Petronas
- Notable drivers: 14. (France) Jean Alesi; 15. (United Kingdom) Johnny Herbert
- Debut: 1998 Australian Grand Prix
- Last event: 1998 Japanese Grand Prix
Races	Wins	Podiums	Poles	F/Laps
16	0	1	0	0
- Constructors' Championships: 0
- Drivers' Championships: 0

The Sauber C17 was the car with which the Sauber team competed in the 1998 Formula One World Championship. It was driven by Frenchman Jean Alesi, who joined from Benetton, and Briton Johnny Herbert, who was in his third season with the team after an impressive 1997 season.

== Season summary ==
1998 confirmed Sauber's position as a respectable midfield runner unable to make the final breakthrough needed to become a top team. The team's package was quick and reliable, but not quite enough to regularly score points. Indeed, Alesi and Herbert finished just outside the points, in seventh, no less than five times. The highlight of the year was Alesi's run to third at the 1998 Belgian Grand Prix to score the team's fourth podium since their F1 début in 1993. This capped an encouraging season for the Frenchman, who was duly kept on for another year. Herbert, despite a points finish in the first race of the season, lost his motivation after a sequence of bad luck and narrowly missing out on further points. He decided to move to Stewart for 1999, and would be replaced by Pedro Diniz.

The team eventually finished sixth in the Constructors' Championship with ten points. This was their best WCC position so far despite scoring the lowest number of points up until then, but there was still some way to go to take on the likes of Ferrari and McLaren.

It was with this car that the last rounded-shape steering wheel in Formula 1 was used. All steering wheels have been rectangular since then.

For the first few races, X-wings were used, but they were banned after the San Marino Grand Prix.

== Complete Formula One results ==
(key) (results in bold indicate pole position)

Year	Team	Engine	Tyres	Drivers	1	2	3	4	5	6	7	8	9	10	11	12	13	14	15	16	Points	WCC
1998	Red Bull Sauber Petronas	Petronas V10	**G**		AUS	BRA	ARG	SMR	ESP	MON	CAN	FRA	GBR	AUT	GER	HUN	BEL	ITA	LUX	JPN	**10**	**6th**
1998	Red Bull Sauber Petronas	Petronas V10	**G**	(France) Jean Alesi	Ret	9	5	6	10	12	Ret	7	Ret	Ret	10	7	3	5	10	7	**10**	**6th**
1998	Red Bull Sauber Petronas	Petronas V10	**G**	(United Kingdom) Johnny Herbert	6	11	Ret	Ret	7	7	Ret	8	Ret	8	Ret	10	Ret	Ret	Ret	10	**10**	**6th**
