= McLaren MP4/13 =

Formula One racing car

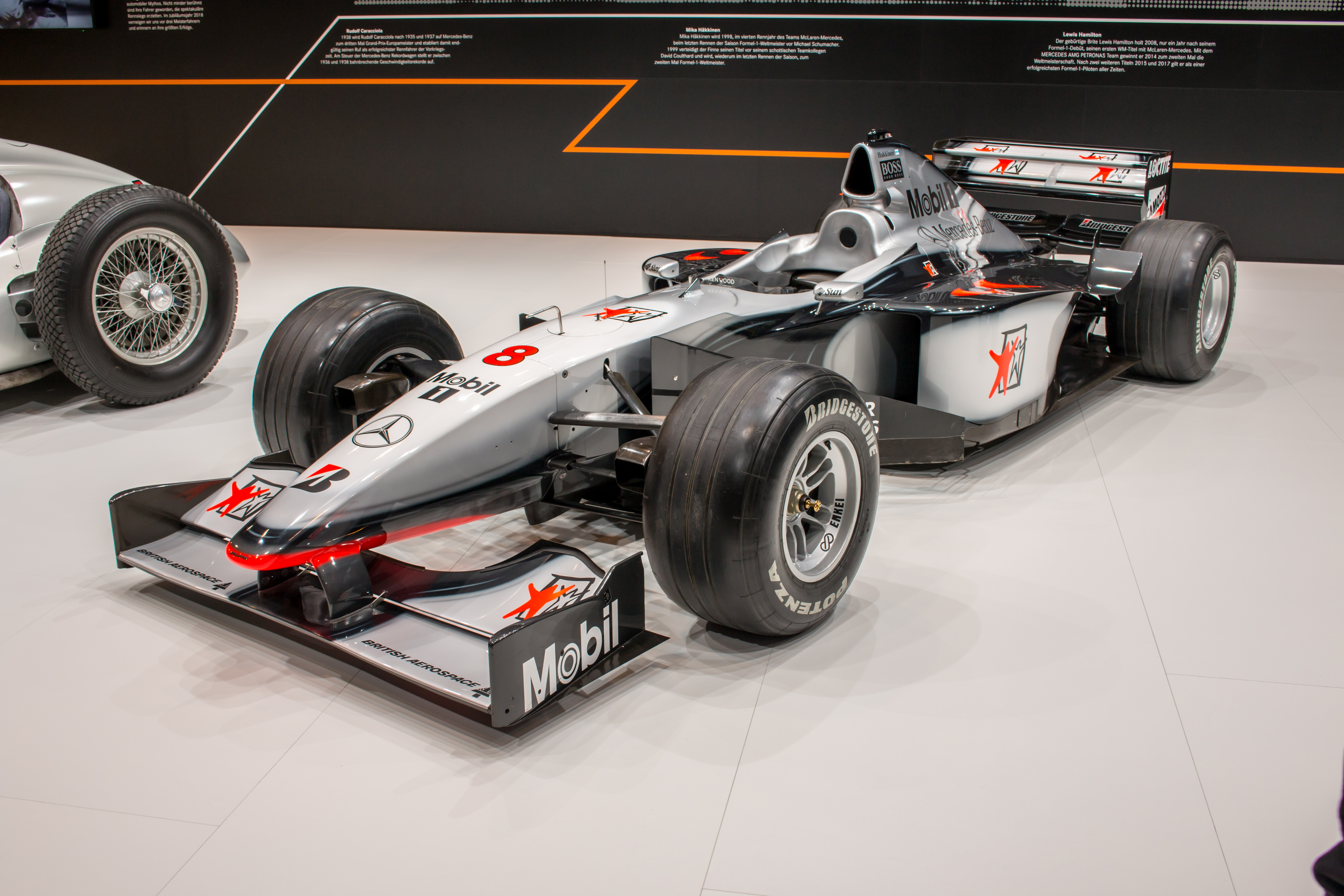
- Mika Häkkinen's McLaren MP4/13 on display in Essen in 2018.
- Category: Formula One
- Constructor: McLaren
- Designers: Adrian Newey (Technical Director); Neil Oatley (Chief Designer); Steve Nichols (Engineering Director); Matthew Jeffreys (Head of Vehicle Design); David North (Head of Transmission); David Neilson (Head of Suspension); Paddy Lowe (Head of R&D); Henri Durand (Head of Aerodynamics); Mario Illien (Technical Director, Engine - Ilmor-Mercedes); Stuart Grove (Chief Designer, Engine - Ilmor-Mercedes)
- Predecessor: MP4/12
- Successor: MP4/14

Technical specifications
- Chassis: Moulded carbon-fibre composite structure
- Suspension (front): Double wishbones, pushrod
- Suspension (rear): Double wishbones, pushrod
- Engine: Mercedes-Benz FO-110G V10 (72º)
- Transmission: McLaren six-gear longitudinal semi-automatic sequential.
- Power: 760 hp (567 kW) @ 17,000 rpm
- Fuel: Mobil 1
- Tyres: Bridgestone

Competition history
- Notable entrants: West McLaren Mercedes
- Notable drivers: 7. (United Kingdom) David Coulthard; 8. (Finland) Mika Häkkinen
- Debut: 1998 Australian Grand Prix
- First win: 1998 Australian Grand Prix
- Last win: 1998 Japanese Grand Prix
- Last event: 1998 Japanese Grand Prix
Races	Wins	Podiums	Poles	F/Laps
16	9	20	12	9
- Constructors' Championships: 1 (1998)
- Drivers' Championships: 1 (1998, Mika Häkkinen)

The McLaren MP4/13 was the car with which the McLaren team competed in the 1998 Formula One World Championship. The chassis was designed by Adrian Newey, Steve Nichols, Neil Oatley and Henri Durand, with Mario Illien designing the bespoke Ilmor engine. Driven by Mika Häkkinen and David Coulthard, the MP4/13 proved to be the dominant car of the season, with Häkkinen winning eight races en route to his first Drivers' Championship, while McLaren won their first Constructors' Championship since 1991. Until 2024, this was the last McLaren Formula One car to win the Constructors' Championship and the last car to win the Drivers' and Constructors' Championship double for the team until the MCL39 did so in 2025.

== History ==
Designer Adrian Newey had joined McLaren from Williams in 1997, but was unable to influence the design of the McLaren MP4/12 other than adjustment during the season. His work was rewarded when drivers Mika Häkkinen and David Coulthard finished first and second at the season-ending European Grand Prix.

When the 1998 season got underway four months later, it became clear that Newey had adapted to the rule changes for 1998 best. With the cars now narrower and running on grooved tyres, the all-new design of the MP4/13 made it the car to beat.

The dominance of the MP4/13 was displayed in the opening race of 1998 in Australia, as Häkkinen and Coulthard finished a lap ahead of the rest of the field. Newey's aerodynamic design was by far the most efficient one and Mercedes produced the most powerful engine of the season. The team was aided by a unique brake-steer system that allowed the driver to use any one of the car's brakes independently to aid cornering, a system first used in 1997. The Ferrari team protested, stating that the brake-steer system was a violation of the technical rules, which banned four-wheel steering. The FIA eventually sided with Ferrari and the system was banned, although the team was allowed to keep their results up to that point.

In addition, the car had an early hybrid system that used brake energy to generate electrical power that was stored in batteries. This power could then be deployed to run auxiliary pumps on the engine to combat parasitic losses, resulting in an extra 30 to 40 horsepower for a limited period.

McLaren's dominance continued in the second race of the season in Brazil, before Ferrari started to close the gap from the Argentine Grand Prix onwards. The MP4/13 retained its superiority on high-speed tracks like Hockenheim and Silverstone, while Ferrari's F300 was closer to the McLaren on more technical circuits. Speaking of the MP4/13 some years later, Coulthard said that the car was fast but understeered through slow corners; this was due to Newey's design that maximized the car's aerodynamic grip over its mechanical grip. Häkkinen initially found the car to be nervous in testing due to a rearward biased instability, but this was corrected before the season started.

During 1998, Coulthard's MP4/13 speed-trapped the highest of all F1 cars that year when he was clocked at 353 km/h (219 mph) at the old Hockenheim circuit.

Although Ferrari's Michael Schumacher took the Drivers' Championship battle to the final race in Japan, Häkkinen took the title with his eighth race win of the season. Coulthard won one race, in San Marino, en route to third place overall, while McLaren won the Constructors' Championship. This was McLaren's first championship victory since 1991 with Ayrton Senna and, in terms of race wins, the team's most successful year since 1989.

== Steering wheel ==
Mika Häkkinen and David Coulthard used different shaped MP4/13 steering wheels. Häkkinen's version was the butterfly-style wheel, and Coulthard's included a lower grip. McLaren used four gearshift paddles in the MP4/13. The two blue paddles are the gear selectors, while the lower pair allow the driver to operate the clutch with either hand.

== Sponsorship and livery ==
The livery was similar to the previous season with additional new sponsorship from Loctite, Computer Associates, Warsteiner and Schüco. Camozzi sponsorship was retained.

McLaren used the West logos, except at the French, British and German Grands Prix; they were replaced with a "double stars" logo in Britain and Germany, while in France they were replaced with blank space. The Warsteiner logo was also removed in France.

== Aftermath ==
During 1998 both Nick Heidfeld and Ricardo Zonta acted as test drivers for McLaren and drove the MP4/13 at test sessions. The record time for the Goodwood Festival of Speed hillclimb was set in 1999 when Heidfeld drove an MP4/13 up the hill in 41.6 seconds. In 2021 the MP4/13 set the second outright fastest lap time around Laguna Seca in the hands of Mexican IndyCar driver Pato O'Ward, when O'Ward lapped the circuit at 1 minute 10.3 seconds, nearly a second faster than a 2021 McLaren IndyCar around the same circuit.

== Other ==
In July 2017, video game developer Codemasters announced that the MP4/13 would appear in the video game F1 2017 as a classic car. It also appears in F1 2018 and F1 2019.

== Technical specifications ==
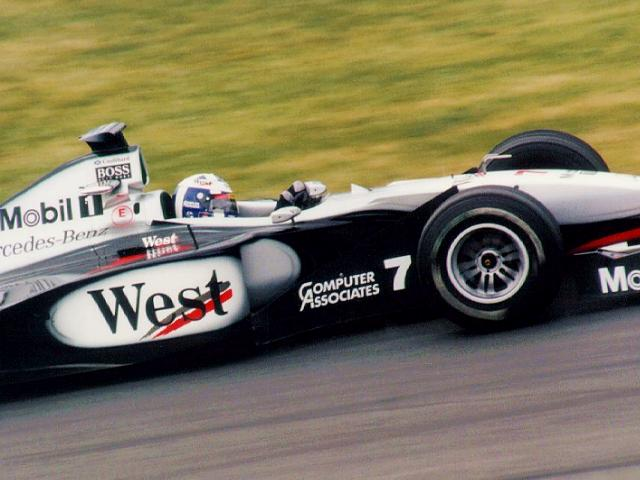
David Coulthard driving the MP4/13 at the 1998 Canadian Grand Prix.

=== Car: McLaren MP4/13 ===
- Chassis: carbon fibre, aluminium
- Gearbox: 6 gears
- Cooling system: two McLaren/Calsonic water radiators, two McLaren/Marston oil radiators.
- Length of the whole car: 4,550 mm (179.1 in)
- Weight with water, oil and driver: 600 kg (1,322.8 lb)

=== Engine: Mercedes-Benz FO-110G ===
- Cylinders: 10, in a 72° angle
- Valves: 4 per cylinder
- Length: 590 mm (23.2 in)
- Breadth: 546.4 mm (21.5 in)
- Height: 476 mm (18.7 in)
- Weight: 107 kilograms (236 lb)
- Power: 760 bhp (567 kW)

=== Supplies ===
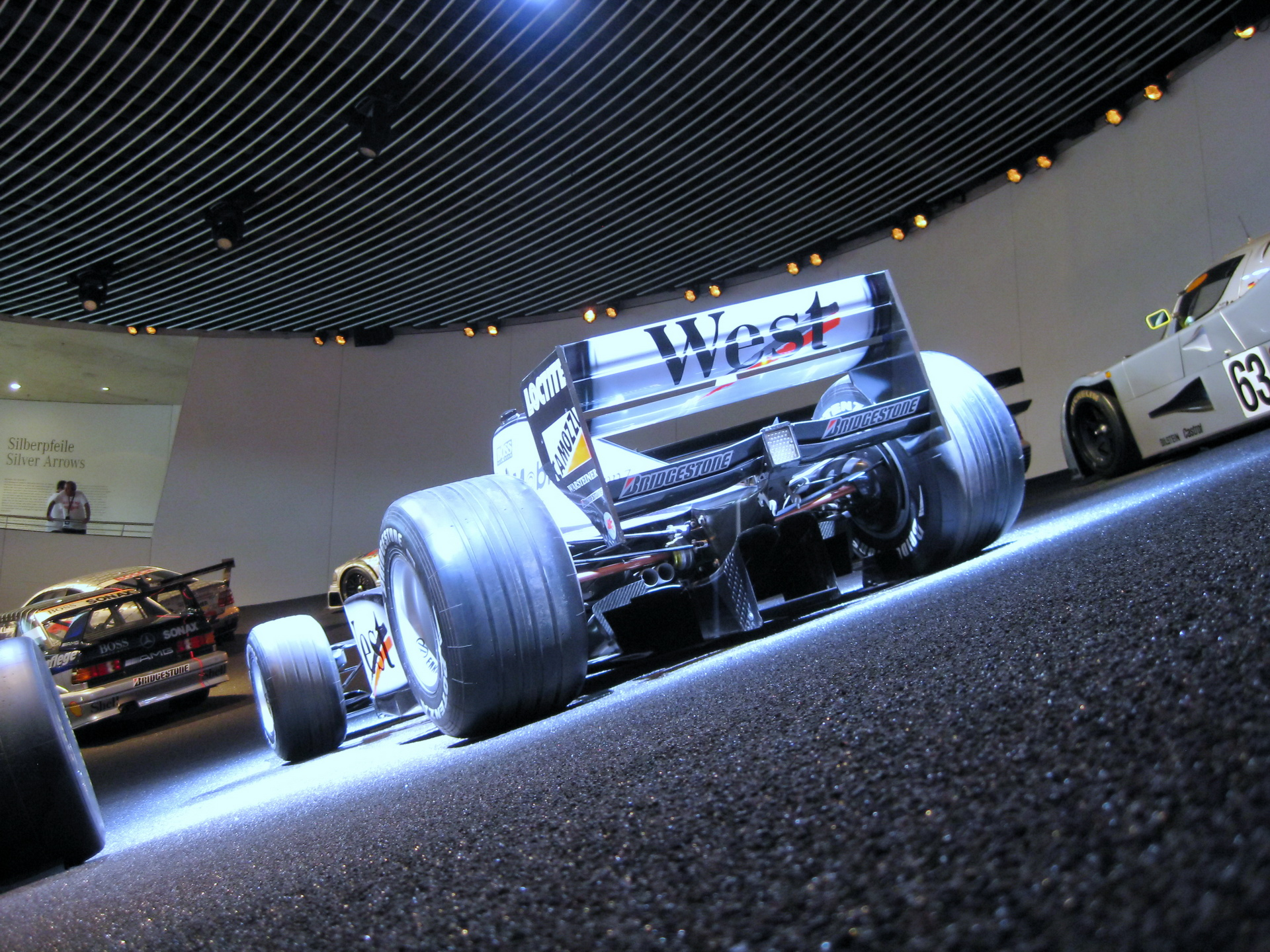
Rear view of the MP4/13.

- Tyres: Bridgestone
- Wheels: Enkei 13-in
- Brakes: AP Racing discs and calipers
- Oil and Petrol: Mobil
- Ignition: TAG 2000
- Spark plugs: NGK

== Complete Formula One results ==
(key) (results in bold indicate pole position; results in italics indicate fastest lap)

Year	Team	Engine	Tyres	Drivers	1	2	3	4	5	6	7	8	9	10	11	12	13	14	15	16	Points	WCC
1998	McLaren	Mercedes V10	**B**		AUS	BRA	ARG	SMR	ESP	MON	CAN	FRA	GBR	AUT	GER	HUN	BEL	ITA	LUX	JPN	**156**	**1st**
1998	McLaren	Mercedes V10	**B**	David Coulthard	2	2	**6**	**1**	2	Ret	**Ret**	6	Ret	2	2	2	7	Ret	3	3	**156**	**1st**
1998	McLaren	Mercedes V10	**B**	Mika Häkkinen	**1**	**1**	2	Ret	**1**	**1**	Ret	**3**	**2**	1	**1**	**6**	**Ret**	4	1	1	**156**	**1st**

Awards
Preceded by Williams FW19	Autosport; Racing Car Of The Year; 1998	Succeeded by McLaren MP4/14
