= 1998 Formula One World Championship =

52nd season of FIA Formula One motor racing

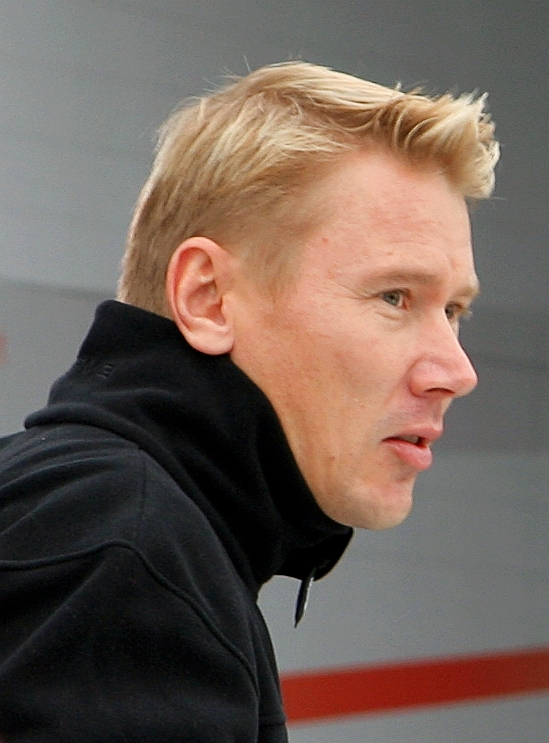
Mika Häkkinen (pictured in 2006) won his first title with 100 points for McLaren.

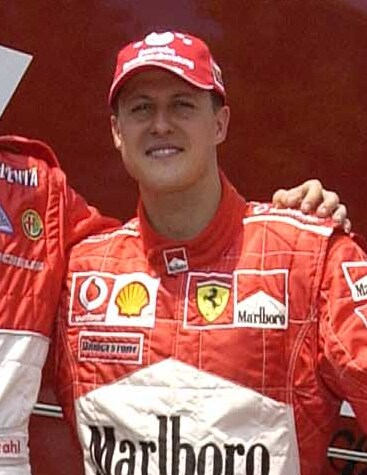
Then two-time champion Michael Schumacher of Ferrari (pictured in 2003) finished as runner-up, 14 points adrift of Häkkinen.

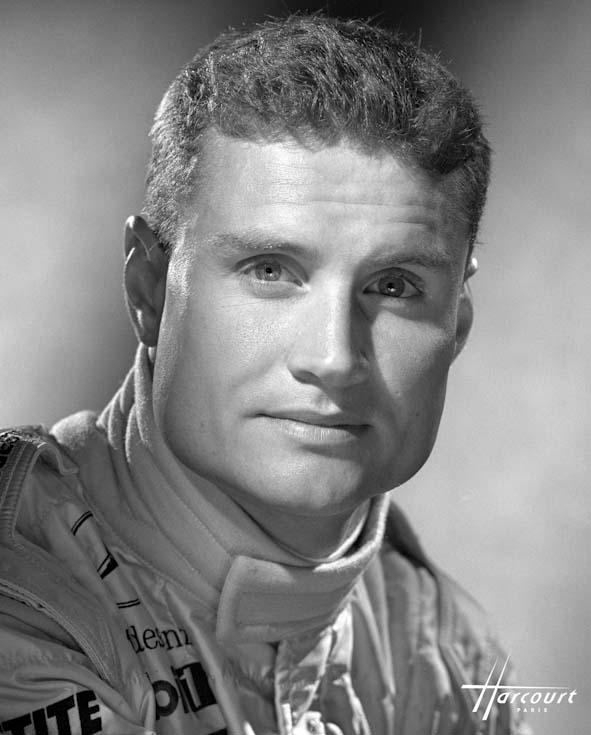
Häkkinen's teammate, David Coulthard (pictured in 1999), finished the season ranked third.

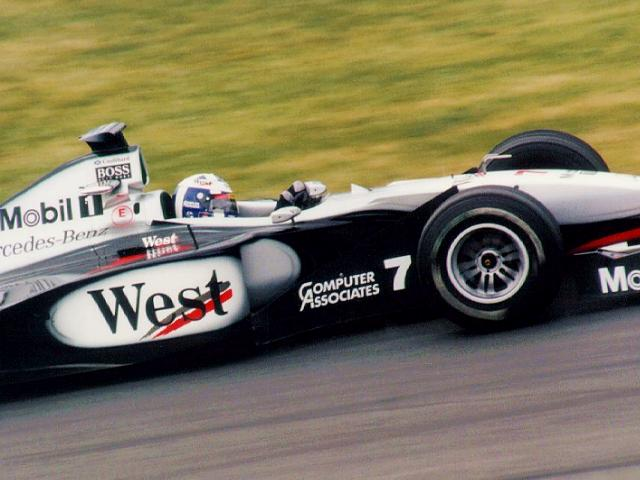
McLaren-Mercedes won the Constructors' Championship with the MP4/13.

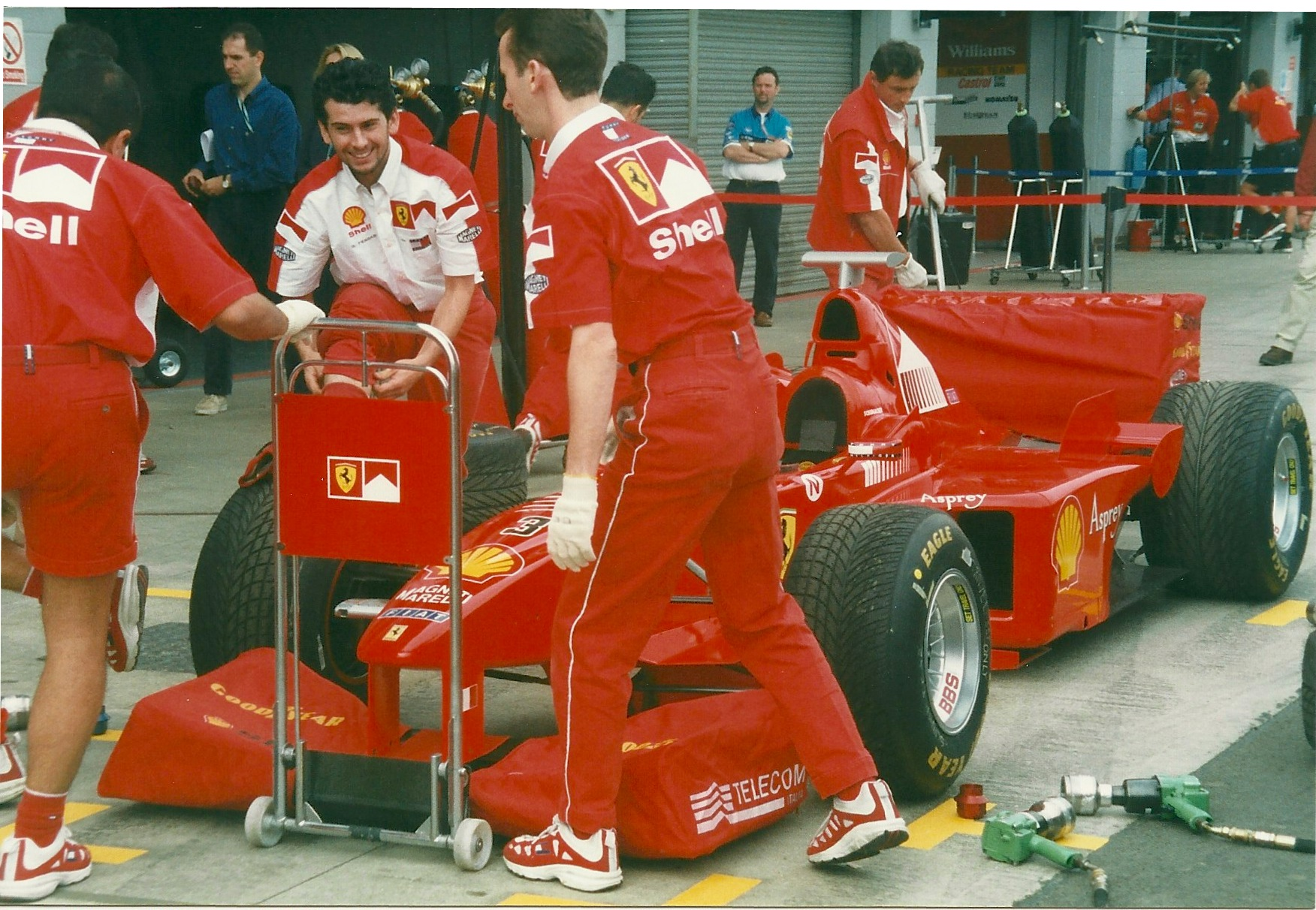
Ferrari placed second in the Constructors' Championship with the F300.

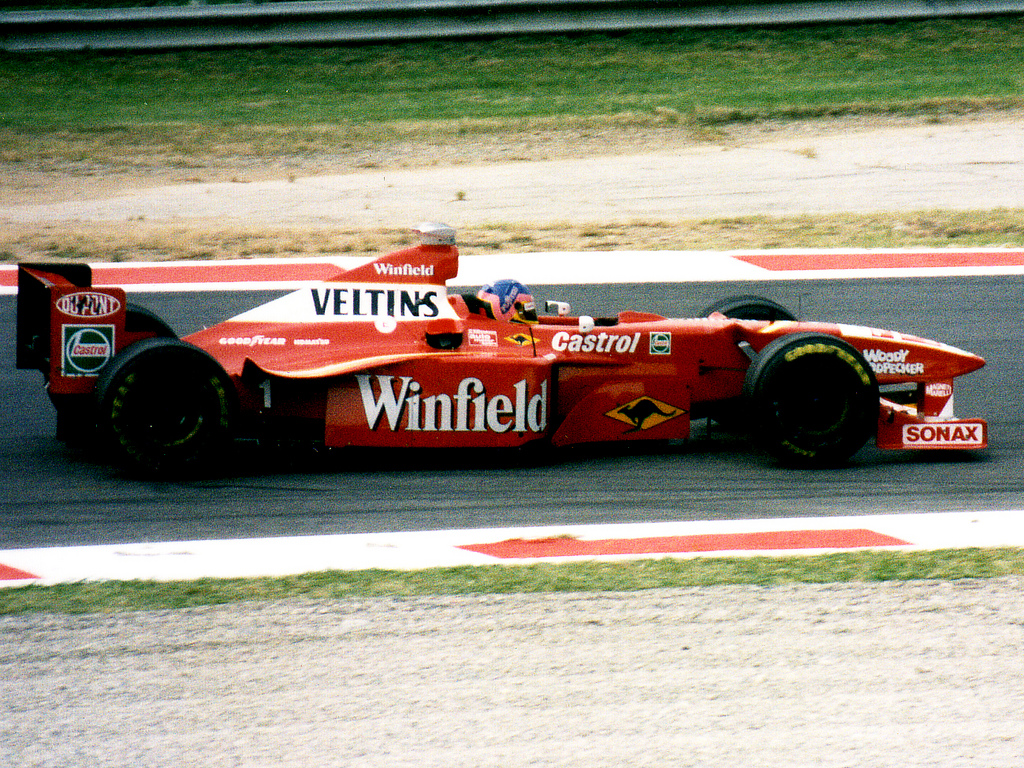
Williams-Mecachrome, the defending Constructors' World Champion, finished third in the Constructors' Championship with the FW20.

The 1998 FIA Formula One World Championship was the 52nd season of FIA Formula One motor racing. It featured the 1998 Formula One World Championship for Drivers and the 1998 Formula One World Championship for Constructors, which were contested concurrently over a sixteen-race series that commenced on 8 March and ended on 1 November.

The season saw a large shuffling of the pecking order, with McLaren emerging as the fastest constructor. After the factory withdrawal of Renault and the departure of designer Adrian Newey to McLaren, the Williams team and Jacques Villeneuve were unable to defend their respective championships. Williams suffered their first winless season since 1988.

Mika Häkkinen won his first World Drivers' Championship and McLaren won the World Constructors' Championship for the first time since 1991. McLaren would wait a further 26 years before their next constructors' title was secured in 2024. In addition, McLaren's double Drivers' and Constructors' Championship success in 1998 was the last time they won both the Drivers' Championship and the Constructors' Championship in the same season until 2025.

== Teams and drivers ==
The following teams and drivers competed in the 1998 FIA Formula One World Championship.

Entrant	Constructor	Chassis	Engine^{†}	Tyre	No.	Driver	Rounds
(United Kingdom) Winfield Williams	Williams-Mecachrome	FW20	Mecachrome GC37-01	G	1	(Canada) Jacques Villeneuve	All
(United Kingdom) Winfield Williams	Williams-Mecachrome	FW20	Mecachrome GC37-01	G	2	(Germany) Heinz-Harald Frentzen	All
(Italy) Scuderia Ferrari Marlboro	Ferrari	F300	Ferrari 047	G	3	(Germany) Michael Schumacher	All
(Italy) Scuderia Ferrari Marlboro	Ferrari	F300	Ferrari 047	G	4	(United Kingdom) Eddie Irvine	All
(Italy) Mild Seven Benetton Playlife	Benetton-Playlife	B198	Playlife GC37-01	B	5	(Italy) Giancarlo Fisichella	All
(Italy) Mild Seven Benetton Playlife	Benetton-Playlife	B198	Playlife GC37-01	B	6	(Austria) Alexander Wurz	All
(United Kingdom) West McLaren Mercedes	McLaren-Mercedes	MP4/13	Mercedes FO110G	B	7	(United Kingdom) David Coulthard	All
(United Kingdom) West McLaren Mercedes	McLaren-Mercedes	MP4/13	Mercedes FO110G	B	8	(Finland) Mika Häkkinen	All
(Republic of Ireland) Benson & Hedges Jordan	Jordan-Mugen-Honda	198	Mugen-Honda MF-301HC	G	9	(United Kingdom) Damon Hill	All
(Republic of Ireland) Benson & Hedges Jordan	Jordan-Mugen-Honda	198	Mugen-Honda MF-301HC	G	10	(Germany) Ralf Schumacher	All
(France) Gauloises Prost Peugeot	Prost-Peugeot	AP01	Peugeot A16	B	11	(France) Olivier Panis	All
(France) Gauloises Prost Peugeot	Prost-Peugeot	AP01	Peugeot A16	B	12	(Italy) Jarno Trulli	All
(Switzerland) Red Bull Sauber Petronas	Sauber-Petronas	C17	Petronas SPE-01D	G	14	(France) Jean Alesi	All
(Switzerland) Red Bull Sauber Petronas	Sauber-Petronas	C17	Petronas SPE-01D	G	15	(United Kingdom) Johnny Herbert	All
(United Kingdom) Danka Zepter Arrows	Arrows	A19	Arrows T2-F1	B	16	(Brazil) Pedro Diniz	All
(United Kingdom) Danka Zepter Arrows	Arrows	A19	Arrows T2-F1	B	17	(Finland) Mika Salo	All
(United Kingdom) HSBC Stewart Ford	Stewart-Ford	SF02	Ford VJ Zetec-R	B	18	(Brazil) Rubens Barrichello	All
(United Kingdom) HSBC Stewart Ford	Stewart-Ford	SF02	Ford VJ Zetec-R	B	19	(Denmark) Jan Magnussen	1–7
(United Kingdom) HSBC Stewart Ford	Stewart-Ford	SF02	Ford VJ Zetec-R	B	19	(Netherlands) Jos Verstappen	8–16
(United Kingdom) PIAA Tyrrell	Tyrrell-Ford	026	Ford JD Zetec-R	G	20	(Brazil) Ricardo Rosset	All
(United Kingdom) PIAA Tyrrell	Tyrrell-Ford	026	Ford JD Zetec-R	G	21	(Japan) Toranosuke Takagi	All
(Italy) Fondmetal Minardi Team	Minardi-Ford	M198	Ford JD Zetec-R	B	22	(Japan) Shinji Nakano	All
(Italy) Fondmetal Minardi Team	Minardi-Ford	M198	Ford JD Zetec-R	B	23	(Argentina) Esteban Tuero	All

^{†} All engines were 3.0 litre, V10 configuration.

=== Team changes ===
At the end of 1997, Renault withdrew as a direct engine supplier from Formula One and thus marked the first season since 1988 that Renault-branded engines were absent due to the company's privatisation plan. As a result, the two teams running Renault engines were forced to source alternative suppliers. Williams opted to run engines supplied by Mecachrome, who were working with Renault to develop the most recent iteration of their RS9 engine rebadged with the Mecachrome name. Benetton sourced a similar rebadged Renault-based Mecachrome engine rebadging it Playlife after a fashion brand owned by the Benetton family. Neither Williams nor Benetton were competitive to the same level as in previous seasons. Renault themselves would invest in Benetton for 2000, before buying the team outright in 2002. They would not supply engines to other competing teams again until 2007.

Arrows had bought out Brian Hart's preparation company to build their own engines. They would do so as well for 1999.

The Prost and Jordan teams swapped their engine suppliers from 1997: Prost now used Peugeot, whilst Jordan used Mugen-Honda.

Minardi switched from Hart to Ford engines.

=== Driver changes ===
Gerhard Berger retired at the end of 1997 after fourteen years in F1, leaving a vacant seat at Benetton. The team also opted not to renew Jean Alesi's contract, so the Frenchman signed a two-year deal to join Johnny Herbert at Sauber. As their replacements, Benetton signed Giancarlo Fisichella from Jordan and Alexander Wurz, who had already substituted for Berger for three races in 1997.

Jordan replaced Fisichella by signing 1996 World Champion Damon Hill to partner Ralf Schumacher. To fill his Hill's seat, Arrows secured the services of Tyrrell's Mika Salo alongside Pedro Diniz. Tyrrell also parted ways with Jos Verstappen in the off-season, despite Ken Tyrrell wanting him to stay. However, new owners British American Tobacco preferred to hire Brazilian Ricardo Rosset, who had briefly raced for the now-defunct Lola team in 1997. They promoted test driver Toranosuke Takagi to fill the second seat. Verstappen returned to F1 midway through 1998 with Stewart, while Lola's other driver, Vincenzo Sospiri, found a home in the IndyCar Series.

Prost retained Olivier Panis, but dropped second driver Shinji Nakano and replaced him with Jarno Trulli. Trulli had started 1997 with Minardi but then substituted for Panis when he broke his leg at the Canadian Grand Prix. Meanwhile, Nakano joined Trulli's old team, Minardi, to replace his retiring countryman Ukyo Katayama. He was partnered by rookie Esteban Tuero, who was promoted from a testing role as he was preferred to the outgoing Tarso Marques. Marques would eventually return to F1 in 2001, also with Minardi.

==== Mid-season changes ====
Jan Magnussen was dropped by Stewart after the Canadian Grand Prix, following a series of underwhelming performances (including crashing into and eliminating his teammate Rubens Barrichello on lap 1 at Imola). He was replaced by Jos Verstappen, who had been out of a drive since leaving Tyrrell at the end of 1997.

== Calendar ==
Round	Grand Prix	Circuit	Date
1	Australian Grand Prix	(Australia) Albert Park Circuit, Melbourne	8 March
2	Brazilian Grand Prix	(Brazil) Autódromo José Carlos Pace, São Paulo	29 March
3	Argentine Grand Prix	(Argentina) Autódromo Oscar Alfredo Gálvez, Buenos Aires	12 April
4	San Marino Grand Prix	(Italy) Autodromo Enzo e Dino Ferrari, Imola	26 April
5	Spanish Grand Prix	(Spain) Circuit de Catalunya, Montmeló	10 May
6	Monaco Grand Prix	Circuit de Monaco, Monte Carlo	24 May
7	Canadian Grand Prix	(Canada) Circuit Gilles Villeneuve, Montreal	7 June
8	French Grand Prix	(France) Circuit de Nevers Magny-Cours, Magny-Cours	28 June
9	British Grand Prix	(United Kingdom) Silverstone Circuit, Silverstone	12 July
10	Austrian Grand Prix	(Austria) A1-Ring, Spielberg, Styria	26 July
11	German Grand Prix	(Germany) Hockenheimring, Hockenheim	2 August
12	Hungarian Grand Prix	(Hungary) Hungaroring, Mogyoród	16 August
13	Belgian Grand Prix	(Belgium) Circuit de Spa-Francorchamps, Stavelot	30 August
14	Italian Grand Prix	(Italy) Autodromo Nazionale Monza, Monza	13 September
15	Luxembourg Grand Prix	(Germany) Nürburgring, Nürburg	27 September
16	Japanese Grand Prix	(Japan) Suzuka Circuit, Suzuka	1 November

=== Calendar changes ===
- The Portuguese Grand Prix was originally scheduled as the penultimate round of the season, to be held at the Estoril circuit on 11 October. However the planned Estoril race was cancelled for a second consecutive year as the government refused to pay for the required safety upgrades. The cancellation left a gap of five weeks to the final race in Japan.
- The European Grand Prix which had taken place at the Circuito de Jerez as a replacement for Portuguese Grand Prix in 1997 was absent from the 1998 calendar. With the race at the Nürburgring retaining the Luxembourg Grand Prix title, this marked the first time in six years that no Grand Prix was held under the European Grand Prix title.

== Regulation changes ==
=== Technical regulations ===
The 1998 season brought about two significant technical changes to reduce cornering speeds and aid overtaking:

- The reintroduction of grooved tyres to replace slicks for the first time since 1970. The front tyres had three grooves, the rear tyres four. This was done to decrease cornering speeds and thus, increase safety. Grooved tyres would remain in Formula One until the reintroduction of slicks in 2009. For 1998, both McLaren and Benetton switched from Goodyear to Bridgestone tyres, as the Japanese manufacturer expanded to work with six of the eleven teams in their second year competing in the sport. The two top teams from 1997, Williams and Ferrari, opted to retain Goodyear tyres. This would result in the two championship protagonist teams working with different tyre manufacturers.
- The reduction of the cars' track, from 2,000 mm (6 ft 7 in) to 1,800 mm (5 ft 11 in). This would give teams less room to play with to create downforce and give drivers more space on the track.

Quite a list of regulations were drafted up with regards to the brakes. The goal was to limit braking performance, thereby improving possibilities of overtaking and reducing costs.

The cameras mounted on top of the engine covers, as seen on selected cars from 1995 to 1997, were changed from an I-shape to a more aerodynamic T-shape. This design has remained largely unchanged since. While the cameras still appeared on selected cars at each race, any car not running a camera had to have a dummy unit (which weighed the same as the camera so that there was no weight advantage) mounted in place.

==== Mid-season changes ====
"X wings", a pair of tall aerodynamic appendages mounted at the front of each sidepod and first seen on the Tyrrell 025 in 1997, were banned before the Spanish Grand Prix. The teams that used them before the ban were Ferrari, Jordan, Prost, Sauber, and Tyrrell.

=== Sporting regulations ===
In 1997, a driver was allowed a maximum of 30 laps free practice per day. This limit was abolished for 1998.

== Season summary ==
=== Rounds 1 to 6 ===
When the season commenced, it was immediately clear that McLaren had adapted to the rule changes best, with their drivers locking out the front row of the grid at the opening race of the season in Australia and both being more than half a second clear of Michael Schumacher in the Ferrari. Mika Häkkinen started on pole position and led up to lap 36, when he misheard a call to come into the pits. Teammate David Coulthard took the lead, but moved over to allow Häkkinen to pass, honouring a pre-race agreement that the driver leading at the first corner could win the race. The result was protested but was held up by the WMSC.

The McLaren drivers finished 1–2 again in Brazil, and in the same order. But once again, controversy was not far away: a protest was lodged regarding the McLaren braking system. It was suggested to allow the drivers to brake front and rear wheels independently, contravening the rules. McLaren agreed not to run the system, but remained dominant in the race.

With Goodyear making steps forward before Argentina, Schumacher was able to take his first win of the season there. Häkkinen finished a distant second and Coulthard only managed sixth after he was tipped into a spin by Schumacher early in the race.

Coulthard bounced back in Imola by gaining pole position and winning the race ahead of the Ferrari's of Schumacher and Eddie Irvine. Häkkinen suffered his first retirement of the season due to a gearbox failure.

It seemed that normal service resumed in Spain, however, where the McLaren took another 1–2 finish led by Häkkinen. A further win for Häkkinen in Monaco gave him a seventeen-point lead over Coulthard with Schumacher a further five points behind.

=== Rounds 7 to 12 ===
Michael Schumacher climbed back in the standings by winning the next three races, while mistakes and mechanical failures cost both Häkkinen and Coulthard points. After the British Grand Prix, Schumacher had closed the gap to Häkkinen to just two points, while Coulthard was 26 points behind his teammate and looking unlikely to be able to fight for the championship.

Consecutive wins in Austria and Germany for Häkkinen, however, proved that McLaren still had the strongest car. Finally, a strategic master stroke in Hungary allowed Schumacher to take the win, with Häkkinen only managing sixth, and close the championship gap again, to just seven points.

=== Rounds 13 to 16 ===
The start of a typically rain-filled Belgian Grand Prix saw one of the worst accidents in Formula One history, with over half the cars on the grid crashing into each other after the first corner. Four of the drivers were unable to take the restart, which took place almost an hour later, due to lack of spare cars. An action-packed race saw Mika Häkkinen spin out into retirement at the restart and saw Michael Schumacher crashing into David Coulthard when trying to lap him. The path was then clear for 1996 world champion Damon Hill to take Jordan's first ever win, followed by teammate Ralf Schumacher in second.

Schumacher bounced back to take a surprise victory in Italy. Häkkinen initially followed in second, but after two spins caused by brake problems, could only manage fourth. The rivals were now level in points with two races to go and Ferrari was back into contention for the Constructors' Championship (just ten points behind on McLaren).

For the next race at the Nürburgring, (Note: All Formula One Grands Prix held at the Nürburgring since 1984 have used the 5 km (3.1 mi) long GP-Strecke and not the 21 km (13 mi) long Nordschleife, which was last used by Formula One in 1976.) Häkkinen managed to beat Schumacher in a straight fight. And the season concluded in Japan, where Häkkinen won without any challenge from Schumacher, who stalled on the grid and retired from a blown tyre later in the race.

This gave Häkkinen his first Drivers' Championship and McLaren their eighth Constructors' Championship. Williams, champions of 1997, experienced a disappointing season overall, with only two podium finishes for reigning champion Jacques Villeneuve and one for Heinz-Harald Frentzen. In Japan, they did manage to secure third in the Constructors' Championship, ahead of Jordan and Benetton.

== Results and standings ==
=== Grands Prix ===
Round	Grand Prix	Pole position	Fastest lap	Winning driver	Constructor	Report
1	(Australia) Australian Grand Prix	(Finland) Mika Häkkinen	(Finland) Mika Häkkinen	(Finland) Mika Häkkinen	(United Kingdom) McLaren-Mercedes	Report
2	(Brazil) Brazilian Grand Prix	(Finland) Mika Häkkinen	(Finland) Mika Häkkinen	(Finland) Mika Häkkinen	(United Kingdom) McLaren-Mercedes	Report
3	(Argentina) Argentine Grand Prix	(United Kingdom) David Coulthard	(Austria) Alexander Wurz	(Germany) Michael Schumacher	(Italy) Ferrari	Report
4	(Italy) San Marino Grand Prix	(United Kingdom) David Coulthard	(Germany) Michael Schumacher	(United Kingdom) David Coulthard	(United Kingdom) McLaren-Mercedes	Report
5	(Spain) Spanish Grand Prix	(Finland) Mika Häkkinen	(Finland) Mika Häkkinen	(Finland) Mika Häkkinen	(United Kingdom) McLaren-Mercedes	Report
6	Monaco Grand Prix	(Finland) Mika Häkkinen	(Finland) Mika Häkkinen	(Finland) Mika Häkkinen	(United Kingdom) McLaren-Mercedes	Report
7	(Canada) Canadian Grand Prix	(United Kingdom) David Coulthard	(Germany) Michael Schumacher	(Germany) Michael Schumacher	(Italy) Ferrari	Report
8	(France) French Grand Prix	(Finland) Mika Häkkinen	(United Kingdom) David Coulthard	(Germany) Michael Schumacher	(Italy) Ferrari	Report
9	(United Kingdom) British Grand Prix	(Finland) Mika Häkkinen	(Germany) Michael Schumacher	(Germany) Michael Schumacher	(Italy) Ferrari	Report
10	(Austria) Austrian Grand Prix	(Italy) Giancarlo Fisichella	(United Kingdom) David Coulthard	(Finland) Mika Häkkinen	(United Kingdom) McLaren-Mercedes	Report
11	(Germany) German Grand Prix	(Finland) Mika Häkkinen	(United Kingdom) David Coulthard	(Finland) Mika Häkkinen	(United Kingdom) McLaren-Mercedes	Report
12	(Hungary) Hungarian Grand Prix	(Finland) Mika Häkkinen	(Germany) Michael Schumacher	(Germany) Michael Schumacher	(Italy) Ferrari	Report
13	(Belgium) Belgian Grand Prix	(Finland) Mika Häkkinen	(Germany) Michael Schumacher	(United Kingdom) Damon Hill	(Republic of Ireland) Jordan-Mugen-Honda	Report
14	(Italy) Italian Grand Prix	(Germany) Michael Schumacher	(Finland) Mika Häkkinen	(Germany) Michael Schumacher	(Italy) Ferrari	Report
15	(Germany) Luxembourg Grand Prix	(Germany) Michael Schumacher	(Finland) Mika Häkkinen	(Finland) Mika Häkkinen	(United Kingdom) McLaren-Mercedes	Report
16	(Japan) Japanese Grand Prix	(Germany) Michael Schumacher (Note: Michael Schumacher set the fastest qualifying time, but started the race from the back of the grid after stalling on the second formation lap. Pole position was left vacant on the grid. Mika Häkkinen, in the second slot, was the first driver on the grid, but Schumacher is still considered to have held pole position.)	(Germany) Michael Schumacher	(Finland) Mika Häkkinen	(United Kingdom) McLaren-Mercedes	Report

=== Scoring system ===
Points were awarded to the top six finishers in each race as follows:

Position	1st	2nd	3rd	4th	5th	6th
Points	10	6	4	3	2	1

=== World Drivers' Championship standings ===
Pos.	Driver	AUS (Australia)	BRA (Brazil)	ARG (Argentina)	SMR (Italy)	ESP (Spain)	MON (Monaco)	CAN (Canada)	FRA (France)	GBR (United Kingdom)	AUT (Austria)	GER (Germany)	HUN (Hungary)	BEL (Belgium)	ITA (Italy)	LUX (Germany)	JPN (Japan)	Points
1	(Finland) Mika Häkkinen	1^{P}^{F}	1^{P}^{F}	2	Ret	1^{P}^{F}	1^{P}^{F}	Ret	3^{P}	2^{P}	1	1^{P}	6^{P}	Ret^{P}	4^{F}	1^{F}	1	100
2	(Germany) Michael Schumacher	Ret	3	1	2^{F}	3	10	1^{F}	1	1^{F}	3	5	1^{F}	Ret^{F}	1^{P}	2^{P}	Ret^{P}^{F}	86
3	(United Kingdom) David Coulthard	2	2	6^{P}	1^{P}	2	Ret	Ret^{P}	6^{F}	Ret	2^{F}	2^{F}	2	7	Ret	3	3	56
4	(United Kingdom) Eddie Irvine	4	8	3	3	Ret	3	3	2	3	4	8	Ret	Ret	2	4	2	47
5	(Canada) Jacques Villeneuve	5	7	Ret	4	6	5	10	4	7	6	3	3	Ret	Ret	8	6	21
6	(United Kingdom) Damon Hill	8	DSQ	8	10^{†}	Ret	8	Ret	Ret	Ret	7	4	4	1	6	9	4	20
7	(Germany) Heinz-Harald Frentzen	3	5	9	5	8	Ret	Ret	15^{†}	Ret	Ret	9	5	4	7	5	5	17
8	(Austria) Alexander Wurz	7	4	4^{F}	Ret	4	Ret	4	5	4	9	11	16^{†}	Ret	Ret	7	9	17
9	(Italy) Giancarlo Fisichella	Ret	6	7	Ret	Ret	2	2	9	5	Ret^{P}	7	8	Ret	8	6	8	16
10	(Germany) Ralf Schumacher	Ret	Ret	Ret	7	11	Ret	Ret	16	6	5	6	9	2	3	Ret	Ret	14
11	(France) Jean Alesi	Ret	9	5	6	10	12^{†}	Ret	7	Ret	Ret	10	7	3	5	10	7	9
12	(Brazil) Rubens Barrichello	Ret	Ret	10	Ret	5	Ret	5	10	Ret	Ret	Ret	Ret	DNS	10	11	Ret	4
13	(Finland) Mika Salo	Ret	Ret	Ret	9	Ret	4	Ret	13	Ret	Ret	14	Ret	DNS	Ret	14	Ret	3
14	(Brazil) Pedro Diniz	Ret	Ret	Ret	Ret	Ret	6	9	14	Ret	Ret	Ret	11	5	Ret	Ret	Ret	3
15	(United Kingdom) Johnny Herbert	6	11^{†}	Ret	Ret	7	7	Ret	8	Ret	8	Ret	10	Ret	Ret	Ret	10	1
16	(Italy) Jarno Trulli	Ret	Ret	11	Ret	9	Ret	Ret	Ret	Ret	10	12	Ret	6	13	Ret	12^{†}	1
17	(Denmark) Jan Magnussen	Ret	10	Ret	Ret	12	Ret	6										1
18	(Japan) Shinji Nakano	Ret	Ret	13	Ret	14	9	7	17^{†}	8	11	Ret	15	8	Ret	15	Ret	0
19	(Argentina) Esteban Tuero	Ret	Ret	Ret	8	15	Ret	Ret	Ret	Ret	Ret	16	Ret	Ret	11	Ret	Ret	0
20	(Brazil) Ricardo Rosset	Ret	Ret	14	Ret	DNQ	DNQ	8	Ret	Ret	12	DNQ	DNQ	DNS	12	Ret	DNQ	0
21	(Japan) Toranosuke Takagi	Ret	Ret	12	Ret	13	11	Ret	Ret	9	Ret	13	14	Ret	9	16	Ret	0
22	(France) Olivier Panis	9	Ret	15^{†}	11^{†}	16^{†}	Ret	Ret	11	Ret	Ret	15	12	DNS	Ret	12	11	0
23	(Netherlands) Jos Verstappen								12	Ret	Ret	Ret	13	Ret	Ret	13	Ret	0
Pos.	Driver	AUS (Australia)	BRA (Brazil)	ARG (Argentina)	SMR (Italy)	ESP (Spain)	MON (Monaco)	CAN (Canada)	FRA (France)	GBR (United Kingdom)	AUT (Austria)	GER (Germany)	HUN (Hungary)	BEL (Belgium)	ITA (Italy)	LUX (Germany)	JPN (Japan)	Points

Key
Colour	Result
Gold	Winner
Silver	Second place
Bronze	Third place
Green	Other points position
Blue	Other classified position
Blue	Not classified, finished (NC)
Purple	Not classified, retired (Ret)
Red	Did not qualify (DNQ)
Black	Disqualified (DSQ)
White	Did not start (DNS)
White	Race cancelled (C)
Blank	Did not practice (DNP)
Blank	Excluded (EX)
Blank	Did not arrive (DNA)
Blank	Withdrawn (WD)
Blank	Did not enter (empty cell)
Annotation	Meaning
P	Pole position
F	Fastest lap

Notes:

- † – Driver did not finish the Grand Prix but was classified, as he completed more than 90% of the race distance.

=== World Constructors' Championship standings ===
Pos.	Constructor	No.	AUS (Australia)	BRA (Brazil)	ARG (Argentina)	SMR (Italy)	ESP (Spain)	MON (Monaco)	CAN (Canada)	FRA (France)	GBR (United Kingdom)	AUT (Austria)	GER (Germany)	HUN (Hungary)	BEL (Belgium)	ITA (Italy)	LUX (Germany)	JPN (Japan)	Points
1	(United Kingdom) McLaren-Mercedes	7	2	2	6^{P}	1^{P}	2	Ret	Ret^{P}	6^{F}	Ret	2^{F}	2^{F}	2	7	Ret	3	3	156
1	(United Kingdom) McLaren-Mercedes	8	1^{P}^{F}	1^{P}^{F}	2	Ret	1^{P}^{F}	1^{P}^{F}	Ret	3^{P}	2^{P}	1	1^{P}	6^{P}	Ret^{P}	4^{F}	1^{F}	1	156
2	(Italy) Ferrari	3	Ret	3	1	2^{F}	3	10	1^{F}	1	1^{F}	3	5	1^{F}	Ret^{F}	1^{P}	2^{P}	Ret^{P}^{F}	133
2	(Italy) Ferrari	4	4	8	3	3	Ret	3	3	2	3	4	8	Ret	Ret	2	4	2	133
3	(United Kingdom) Williams-Mecachrome	1	5	7	Ret	4	6	5	10	4	7	6	3	3	Ret	Ret	8	6	38
3	(United Kingdom) Williams-Mecachrome	2	3	5	9	5	8	Ret	Ret	15^{†}	Ret	Ret	9	5	4	7	5	5	38
4	(Republic of Ireland) Jordan-Mugen-Honda	9	8	DSQ	8	10^{†}	Ret	8	Ret	Ret	Ret	7	4	4	1	6	9	4	34
4	(Republic of Ireland) Jordan-Mugen-Honda	10	Ret	Ret	Ret	7	11	Ret	Ret	16	6	5	6	9	2	3	Ret	Ret	34
5	(Italy) Benetton-Playlife	5	Ret	6	7	Ret	Ret	2	2	9	5	Ret^{P}	7	8	Ret	8	6	8	33
5	(Italy) Benetton-Playlife	6	7	4	4^{F}	Ret	4	Ret	4	5	4	9	11	16^{†}	Ret	Ret	7	9	33
6	(Switzerland) Sauber-Petronas	14	Ret	9	5	6	10	12^{†}	Ret	7	Ret	Ret	10	7	3	5	10	7	10
6	(Switzerland) Sauber-Petronas	15	6	11^{†}	Ret	Ret	7	7	Ret	8	Ret	8	Ret	10	Ret	Ret	Ret	10	10
7	(United Kingdom) Arrows	16	Ret	Ret	Ret	Ret	Ret	6	9	14	Ret	Ret	Ret	11	5	Ret	Ret	Ret	6
7	(United Kingdom) Arrows	17	Ret	Ret	Ret	9	Ret	4	Ret	13	Ret	Ret	14	Ret	DNS	Ret	14	Ret	6
8	(United Kingdom) Stewart-Ford	18	Ret	Ret	10	Ret	5	Ret	5	10	Ret	Ret	Ret	Ret	DNS	10	11	Ret	5
8	(United Kingdom) Stewart-Ford	19	Ret	10	Ret	Ret	12	Ret	6	12	Ret	Ret	Ret	13	Ret	Ret	13	Ret	5
9	(France) Prost-Peugeot	11	9	Ret	15^{†}	11^{†}	16^{†}	Ret	Ret	11	Ret	Ret	15	12	DNS	Ret	12	11	1
9	(France) Prost-Peugeot	12	Ret	Ret	11	Ret	9	Ret	Ret	Ret	Ret	10	12	Ret	6	13	Ret	12^{†}	1
10	(Italy) Minardi-Ford	22	Ret	Ret	13	Ret	14	9	7	17^{†}	8	11	Ret	15	8	Ret	15	Ret	0
10	(Italy) Minardi-Ford	23	Ret	Ret	Ret	8	15	Ret	Ret	Ret	Ret	Ret	16	Ret	Ret	11	Ret	Ret	0
11	(United Kingdom) Tyrrell-Ford	20	Ret	Ret	14	Ret	DNQ	DNQ	8	Ret	Ret	12	DNQ	DNQ	DNS	12	Ret	DNQ	0
11	(United Kingdom) Tyrrell-Ford	21	Ret	Ret	12	Ret	13	11	Ret	Ret	9	Ret	13	14	Ret	9	16	Ret	0
Pos.	Constructor	No.	AUS (Australia)	BRA (Brazil)	ARG (Argentina)	SMR (Italy)	ESP (Spain)	MON (Monaco)	CAN (Canada)	FRA (France)	GBR (United Kingdom)	AUT (Austria)	GER (Germany)	HUN (Hungary)	BEL (Belgium)	ITA (Italy)	LUX (Germany)	JPN (Japan)	Points

Notes:

- † – Driver did not finish the Grand Prix but was classified, as he completed more than 90% of the race distance.
