= Mecachrome =

French engineering company

Mecachrome S.A.S.
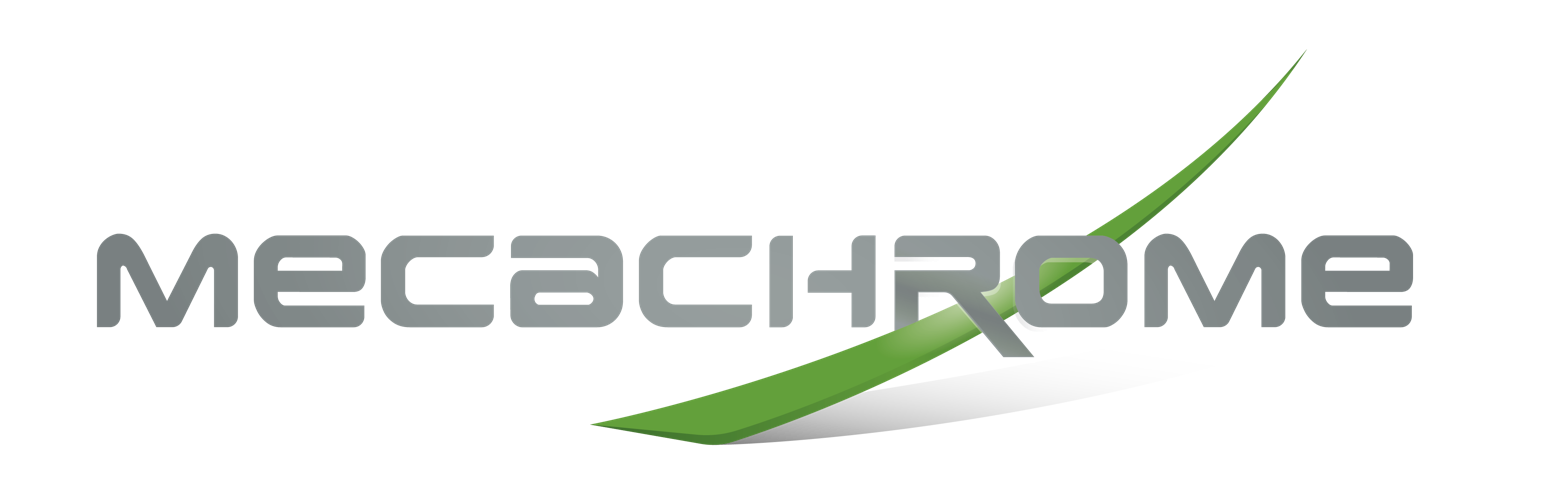
- Type: Private
- Industry: Conglomerate (mainly motorsports, aerospace, spatial, defense, energy & industry and R&D)
- Founded: 1937
- Headquarters: Toulouse-Blagnac, France
- Area served: Worldwide
- Key people: Christian Cornille (CEO)
- Products: Powertrains
- Revenue: €220million (2020)
- Owners: Bpifrance (34%); Tikehau Capital (64%)
- Number of employees: 3700
- Website: http://www.mecachrome.com

Mecachrome SAS is a precision engineering company based in France that operates in the aerospace, motor racing, energy and defence sectors.

== History ==
Mecachrome was founded in 1937 in Colombes, France. As a precision engineering company, Mecachrome focus their business on aerospace, automotive, motor racing, defence and energy sectors designing and manufacturing high value-added parts, systems and structural assemblies.

Mecachrome are known most famously for the manufacture of Formula One engines, designed by Renault for Formula One teams including Williams and Benetton during the 1990s.

In 2003, Mecachrome moved its head office from France to Canada. In 2008, the company went public just prior to the global economic crisis. Their share price plunged from a high of $13.55 per share to 15 cents. By July 2008, Mecachrome made job cuts in both Canada and France with production moving to Canada due to excess capacity caused by delays to the Boeing 787, for which Mecachrome was a supplier. In November, the majority shareholding Casella family who were descendants of the original Mecachrome founders, stepped aside. Christian Jacqmin was appointed CEO. At the end of 2008, Mecachrome completed their financial restructuring.

In April 2014, Mecachrome signed a deal to supply to Safran in the manufacture of the new LEAP engine to be used in a variety of Airbus, Boeing and COMAC aircraft. In 2015, Airbus announced Mecachrome as the manufacturer of nose landing gear bays for their new Beluga aircraft. Mecachrome already worked with Airbus on its A320, A330, A380 and A400M aircraft.

In 2017, Mecachrome declared interest in providing a standardised "budget" engine for Formula One. This would have been in addition to their GP2 & GP3 engine supply deals.

In April 2019, Christian Cornille took over as CEO of Mecachrome and targeted €1bn turnover.

The company operates across 14 sites in Europe, North Africa and North America. In 2020, reported revenues were €220million. Mecachrome employ over 2,500 worldwide.

In 2021, the company changed its corporate address from Amboise to Blagnac.

== Aerospace ==
As of 2024, aerospace accounts for 56% of Mechachrome's international sales. They are primarily concerned with the manufacture of structural parts, such as wing spars, fuselage sections and sheet metal parts. Mechachrome's primary business partners include Airbus, Boeing, Dassault and Embraer, working on both civilian and military aircraft such as the Boeing 737 and Eurocopter Tiger. Furthermore, they are also involved in the manufacturing of parts for the Dassault Rafale, and its Snecma M88 engine.

Mecachrome has acquired several specialist manufacturers and suppliers, most notably WeAre group in 2022, expanding its manufacturing capability. Through these acquisitions, Mecachrome has access to 20 manufacturing sites across 5 continents.

== Motor racing ==
=== Formula One ===
Mecachrome as a Formula One engine manufacturer
Formula One World Championship career
- First entry: 1998 Australian Grand Prix
- Last entry: 1998 Japanese Grand Prix
- Races entered: 16
- Chassis: Williams, Benetton
- Constructors' Championships: 0
- Drivers' Championships: 0
- Race victories: 0
- Podiums: 5
- Points: 71
- Pole positions: 1
- Fastest laps: 1

==== Association and collaboration with Renault (1977-1986, 1989-2025) ====
Since 1977 until present, Mecachrome has been involved with Renault Sport, the motorsport division of Renault (though today Renault Sport's F1 operations are conducted through Renault Sport F1, a separate group company).

From 1983, Renault began to supply other teams with engines; Mecachrome being given the responsibility of preparing and assembling the engines for these customer teams such as Lotus-Renault in 1983 and Ligier-Renault in 1984. In 1985, Renault withdrew from Formula One as a constructor and from engine supply for the 1987 season. In 1989, Renault returned to F1 as an engine supplier to WilliamsF1 (and Ligier from 1992) with Mecachrome again responsible for preparing the engines for the team.

Renault engines powered Williams and Benetton to six consecutive Constructors' World Championships between 1992 and 1997 and five Drivers' titles with Nigel Mansell (1992), Alain Prost (1993), Michael Schumacher (1995), Damon Hill (1996) and Jacques Villeneuve (1997).

In 1995, Benetton acquired Ligier's stock of Renault V10 engines (same specifications as Williams). In 1996, Renault was privatised and announced its withdrawal from Formula One after the 1997 season. In order to avoid protests by shareholders regarding the costs of engine development, Mecachrome agreed to pay Renault for the development work in order to continue the relationship. The 1998 engines supplied to Williams carried the Mecachrome name while Benetton's engines were badged as Playlife.

In 1998, Flavio Briatore's company, Super Performance Competition Engineering, signed a distribution agreement with Mecachrome to begin in the 1999 season. The engines were purchased and rebadged as Supertec. Supertecs powered Williams in 1999, BAR in 1999 and Arrows in 2000. Supertec also continued to power Benetton under the Playlife brand.

In 2001, Renault returned to Formula One by purchasing the Benetton team with the Renault-designed engines carrying again the Renault name. The relationship remained unchanged with Renault responsible for research and design, assembly, preparation, maintenance, trackside support and also tune-up; this relationship helped Renault win constructors' and driver's F1 championships in 2005 and 2006 with Fernando Alonso.

Mecachrome-assembled Renault engines powered the Red Bull Racing Formula One team to the Constructors' Championship and Red Bull driver Sebastian Vettel to the World Drivers' Championship in 2010, 2011, 2012 and 2013.

During the start of enhanced hybrid turbocharged power unit regulations, once again Mecachrome helped Renault Energy F1 hybrid power unit build, development, assembly and tune-up for 2014 season onwards. Due to the lack of success and unreliability of their engines since the beginning of the V6 turbo-hybrid era in 2014, on 29 September 2024, Renault announced that it would be ending its works engine programme and would therefore cease to provide engines for Alpine after 2025, when revised engine regulations are set to be introduced in 2026 thereby ending Mecachrome's long standing collaboration with Renault in Formula One. Groupe Renault CEO Luca de Meo has stated financial reasons as the main reason behind ending the programme, claiming that it would be cheaper to purchase a power unit from another manufacturer than continue to develop one in-house.

==== Future ====
In May 2025 various media sources reported that Mecachrome had signed a deal to stay in Formula One by being an engine parts supplier.

=== GP2 Series/FIA Formula 2 Championship ===
In 2005, the GP2 Series (now FIA Formula 2 Championship) was launched as the official feeder category to Formula One. As the brainchild of Bernie Ecclestone and Flavio Briatore, the new series was to be powered by Renault engines (badging only), and Mecachrome was tasked with their production. The engines were manufactured at the same base as the Renault F1 units in Aubigny, France with direction from Heini Mader in Switzerland.

The company continued to provide engines and gearboxes for the GP2 Series in its second generation (2008–2010) whilst also supplying the new-for-2008 GP2 Asia Series with slightly detuned versions of the power unit which has been at the core of the GP2 Series since 2005.

Since the 2011 season, Renault Sport no longer badge their Mecachrome engines due to Renault Sport focusing on their Formula One programme.

The Mecachrome V8 GP2/F2 engines were jointly developed by Mecachrome and TEOS Engineering for design, tune-up, R&D, engine maintenance, arrangement and trackside support. The GP2 Series/FIA Formula 2 Championship V8 engine formula specification was in use from 2005 and was retired following the 2017 season.

New engine regulations with 620 hp 3,400 cc V6 single-turbocharged direct-injected engines, known as the Mecachrome V634 Turbo, which is a development of the naturally aspirated Mecachrome V634 used in the GP3 Series, were introduced for 2018 along with a new Dallara F2 2018 chassis while TEOS Engineering renewed its subcontract relationship with Mecachrome on track in the FIA Formula 2 Championship for 2018 beyond. Dutch turbocharger company Van Der Lee Turbo Systems supplies the turbochargers for all FIA Formula 2 Championship engines.

=== GP3 Series/FIA Formula 3 Championship ===
In 2015 alongside the Dallara GP3/16 car launch, Mecachrome was selected as the official engine partner and supplier of GP3 Series since 2016 season onwards. The Mecachrome V634 GP3/F3 engines are also jointly developed by Mecachrome and TEOS Engineering for design, tune-up, R&D, engine maintenance, arrangement, shared-production and trackside support. Despite the new Dallara F3 2019 car unveil, the current Mecachrome V634 which will be used by all FIA Formula 3 competitors will extend its service until at least the 2024 season.

=== World Endurance Championship ===
In 2017, Mecachrome partnered with Ginetta as an engine supplier for the G60-LT-P1 LMP1 Prototype, supplying the V634P1, a variant of the V634 F2 engine, which would also be turbocharged by Van Der Lee Turbo Systems. The Ginetta G60-LT-P1-AER, run by CEFC TRSM, was to compete in the 2018 24 Hours of Le Mans and the full 2018–19 FIA World Endurance Championship. However, after withdrawing from the opening WEC round at Spa-Francorchamps and achieving a fifth in class result at Le Mans, which was in reality a 41st position result in the overall standings, Ginetta dropped the Mecachrome V634P1 in favour of the AER P60B engines. This was done due to a performance deficit from the turbo V6 engine, and the lack of response to calls for a development programme from Mecachrome Motorsport, with the stated aim being to unlock the true performance of the chassis. Mecachrome Motorsport responded to Ginetta's announcement soon afterwards, also revealing that it intended to continue its LMP1 engine programme, although it has yet to find any customers to run the engine in any chassis since. Ginetta technical director Ewan Baldry later responded to Mecachrome's claims, acknowledging that while the engine utilised at Le Mans was a first specification engine, the engine was underpowered and did not meet the contractually agreed performance targets.

From the 2024 WEC season onward, Mecachrome provided the engines for the two Alpine-entered A424s, supplying a heavily modified version of the V634 engine used in FIA Formula 2. At the 2024 24 Hours of Le Mans, both Alpines retired with engine issues: the #35 entry stopped at Arnage after five hours with smoke blowing out of the car, whilst the #36 ended their race in the pits during hour 6.

== Complete Formula One World Championship results ==
(key) (results in bold indicate pole position) (Races in italics indicate fastest lap)

Year	Entrant	Chassis	Engine	Tyres	Drivers	1	2	3	4	5	6	7	8	9	10	11	12	13	14	15	16	Points	WCC
1998	Winfield Williams	Williams FW20	Mecachrome GC37-01 3.0 V10	**G**		AUS	BRA	ARG	SMR	ESP	MON	CAN	FRA	GBR	AUT	GER	HUN	BEL	ITA	LUX	JPN	38	3rd
1998	Winfield Williams	Williams FW20	Mecachrome GC37-01 3.0 V10	**G**	(Canada) Jacques Villeneuve	5	7	Ret	4	6	5	10	4	7	6	3	3	Ret	Ret	8	6	38	3rd
1998	Winfield Williams	Williams FW20	Mecachrome GC37-01 3.0 V10	**G**	(Germany) Heinz-Harald Frentzen	3	5	9	5	8	Ret	Ret	15	Ret	Ret	9	5	4	7	5	5	38	3rd
1998	Mild Seven Benetton	Benetton B198	Playlife (Mecachrome) GC37-01 3.0 V10	**B**	(Italy) Giancarlo Fisichella	Ret	6	7	Ret	Ret	2	2	9	5	**Ret**	7	8	Ret	8	6	8	33	5th
1998	Mild Seven Benetton	Benetton B198	Playlife (Mecachrome) GC37-01 3.0 V10	**B**	(Austria) Alexander Wurz	7	4	4	Ret	4	Ret	4	5	4	9	11	16	Ret	Ret	7	9	33	5th
