= 1998 Brazilian Grand Prix =

Race 2 of 16 in the 1998 Formula One World Championship
← Previous race	Next race →
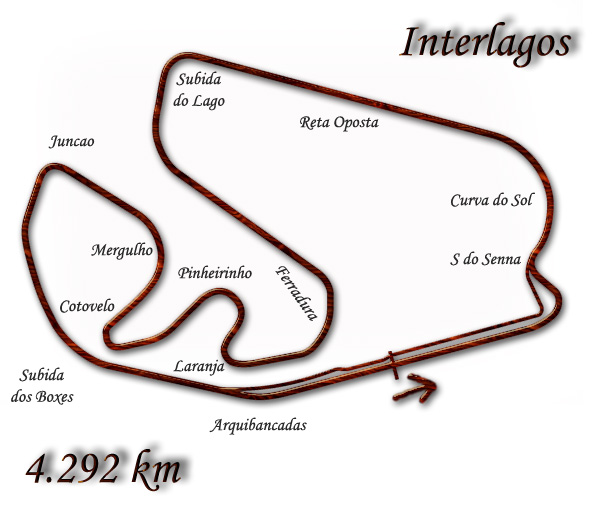

Race details
- Date: 29 March 1998
- Official name: XXVII Grande Prêmio Marlboro do Brasil
- Location: Autódromo José Carlos Pace; São Paulo, Brazil
- Course: Permanent racing facility
- Course length: 4.292 km (2.667 miles)
- Distance: 72 laps, 309.024 km (192.019 miles)
- Weather: Mostly cloudy, 31 °C (88 °F)

Pole position
Driver	(Finland) Mika Häkkinen	McLaren-Mercedes
- Time: 1:17.092

Fastest lap
Driver	(Finland) Mika Häkkinen	McLaren-Mercedes
- Time: 1:19.337 on lap 65

Podium
First	(Finland) Mika Häkkinen	McLaren-Mercedes
Second	(United Kingdom) David Coulthard	McLaren-Mercedes
Third	(Germany) Michael Schumacher	Ferrari

The 1998 Brazilian Grand Prix was a Formula One motor race held at Interlagos on 29 March 1998. It was the second race of the 1998 FIA Formula One World Championship. Mika Häkkinen, driving a McLaren-Mercedes, took pole position, set the fastest lap and led every lap on his way to victory in the 72-lap race. Teammate David Coulthard finished second, with Michael Schumacher third in a Ferrari.

== Report ==
=== Background ===
Before the race there was a furore surrounding McLaren as Scuderia Ferrari had protested about its braking system, which enabled the drivers to apply the brakes on the rear wheels independently, and thus assist both turn into corners and traction out of them. This effectively meant that the system was a four-wheel steering device, which was banned by the FIA. McLaren announced that they would not appeal the decision. Ferrari, Sauber, and Minardi had all protested the designs of the McLaren, Williams, and Jordan cars, whilst Arrows had protested the McLaren and Williams designs and Tyrrell had protested against McLaren's design. Ferrari were censured by the stewards for claiming their competitors cars to be "dangerous", which FIA technical delegate Charlie Whiting refuted. Drivers including Jacques Villeneuve and Damon Hill (the two most recent World Champion drivers) disliked how the device performed. As a result of Ferrari's protest, the team agreed not to use the system at any stage over the weekend. However, team boss Ron Dennis was livid that the system had been approved on four occasions by Whiting, but was being declared illegal by the three stewards in office for the Brazilian Grand Prix.

=== Race ===
As soon as the race started, Mika Häkkinen took the lead, and he subsequently led every lap of the Grand Prix. At the back of the grid the Arrows team had their worst weekend since Tom Walkinshaw took over with Mika Salo qualifying 20th, and Pedro Diniz qualifying last. On lap one Häkkinen led David Coulthard by over a second, and was three seconds ahead of Heinz-Harald Frentzen in third. Ralf Schumacher spun out on the first lap at the fourth corner, meaning that he had not finished a single lap so far in the season. Eddie Irvine was ahead of the slow-starting Michael Schumacher. On lap 18 Coulthard was 5 seconds behind Häkkinen. Frentzen and Schumacher, after getting past his teammate, were 23 seconds behind the McLaren duo. Schumacher passed Frentzen at the first pit stop, but had to fight to make sure he was not lapped by the two McLarens. The McLarens were totally dominant, for the second time in as many races. Ferrari and Benetton could not compete with them, while reigning World Constructors' Champion Williams were also struggling. Damon Hill was disqualified following the race as his car did not meet the minimum weight requirements.

== Classification ==
=== Qualifying ===
Pos	No	Driver	Constructor	Lap Time	Gap
1	8	(Finland) Mika Häkkinen	McLaren-Mercedes	1:17.092	
2	7	(United Kingdom) David Coulthard	McLaren-Mercedes	1:17.757	+0.665
3	2	(Germany) Heinz-Harald Frentzen	Williams-Mecachrome	1:18.109	+1.017
4	3	(Germany) Michael Schumacher	Ferrari	1:18.250	+1.158
5	6	(Austria) Alexander Wurz	Benetton-Playlife	1:18.261	+1.169
6	4	(United Kingdom) Eddie Irvine	Ferrari	1:18.449	+1.357
7	5	(Italy) Giancarlo Fisichella	Benetton-Playlife	1:18.652	+1.560
8	10	(Germany) Ralf Schumacher	Jordan-Mugen-Honda	1:18.735	+1.643
9	11	(France) Olivier Panis	Prost-Peugeot	1:18.753	+1.661
10	1	(Canada) Jacques Villeneuve	Williams-Mecachrome	1:18.761	+1.669
11	9	(United Kingdom) Damon Hill	Jordan-Mugen-Honda	1:18.988	+1.896
12	12	(Italy) Jarno Trulli	Prost-Peugeot	1:19.069	+1.977
13	18	(Brazil) Rubens Barrichello	Stewart-Ford	1:19.344	+2.252
14	15	(United Kingdom) Johnny Herbert	Sauber-Petronas	1:19.375	+2.283
15	14	(France) Jean Alesi	Sauber-Petronas	1:19.449	+2.357
16	19	(Denmark) Jan Magnussen	Stewart-Ford	1:19.644	+2.552
17	21	(Japan) Toranosuke Takagi	Tyrrell-Ford	1:20.203	+3.111
18	22	(Japan) Shinji Nakano	Minardi-Ford	1:20.390	+3.298
19	23	(Argentina) Esteban Tuero	Minardi-Ford	1:20.459	+3.367
20	17	(Finland) Mika Salo	Arrows	1:20.481	+3.389
21	20	(Brazil) Ricardo Rosset	Tyrrell-Ford	1:20.748	+3.656
22	16	(Brazil) Pedro Diniz	Arrows	1:20.847	+3.755
107% time: 1:22.488

=== Race ===
Pos	No	Driver	Constructor	Laps	Time/Retired	Grid	Points
1	8	(Finland) Mika Häkkinen	McLaren-Mercedes	72	1:37:11.747	1	10
2	7	(United Kingdom) David Coulthard	McLaren-Mercedes	72	+ 1.102	2	6
3	3	(Germany) Michael Schumacher	Ferrari	72	+ 1:00.550	4	4
4	6	(Austria) Alexander Wurz	Benetton-Playlife	72	+ 1:07.453	5	3
5	2	(Germany) Heinz-Harald Frentzen	Williams-Mecachrome	71	+ 1 Lap	3	2
6	5	(Italy) Giancarlo Fisichella	Benetton-Playlife	71	+ 1 Lap	7	1
7	1	(Canada) Jacques Villeneuve	Williams-Mecachrome	71	+ 1 Lap	10	
8	4	(United Kingdom) Eddie Irvine	Ferrari	71	+ 1 Lap	6	
9	14	(France) Jean Alesi	Sauber-Petronas	71	+ 1 Lap	15	
10	19	(Denmark) Jan Magnussen	Stewart-Ford	70	+ 2 Laps	16	
11	15	(United Kingdom) Johnny Herbert	Sauber-Petronas	67	Physical	14	
Ret	11	(France) Olivier Panis	Prost-Peugeot	63	Engine	9	
Ret	18	(Brazil) Rubens Barrichello	Stewart-Ford	56	Gearbox	13	
Ret	20	(Brazil) Ricardo Rosset	Tyrrell-Ford	52	Gearbox	21	
Ret	23	(Argentina) Esteban Tuero	Minardi-Ford	44	Throttle	19	
Ret	16	(Brazil) Pedro Diniz	Arrows	26	Gearbox	22	
Ret	21	(Japan) Toranosuke Takagi	Tyrrell-Ford	19	Engine	17	
Ret	17	(Finland) Mika Salo	Arrows	18	Engine	20	
Ret	12	(Italy) Jarno Trulli	Prost-Peugeot	17	Fuel Pump	12	
Ret	22	(Japan) Shinji Nakano	Minardi-Ford	3	Spun Off	18	
Ret	10	(Germany) Ralf Schumacher	Jordan-Mugen-Honda	0	Spun Off	8	
DSQ	9	(United Kingdom) Damon Hill	Jordan-Mugen-Honda	70	Underweight	11	

== Championship standings after the race ==
Drivers' Championship standings

Pos	Driver	Points
1	(Finland) Mika Häkkinen	20
2	(United Kingdom) David Coulthard	12
3	(Germany) Heinz-Harald Frentzen	6
4	(Germany) Michael Schumacher	4
5	(United Kingdom) Eddie Irvine	3

Constructors' Championship standings

Pos	Constructor	Points
1	(United Kingdom) McLaren-Mercedes	32
2	(United Kingdom) Williams-Mecachrome	8
3	(Italy) Ferrari	7
4	(Italy) Benetton-Playlife	4
5	(Switzerland) Sauber-Petronas	1

- Note: Only the top five positions are included for both sets of standings.

Previous race: 1998 Australian Grand Prix	FIA Formula One World Championship; 1998 season	Next race: 1998 Argentine Grand Prix
Previous race: 1997 Brazilian Grand Prix	Brazilian Grand Prix	Next race: 1999 Brazilian Grand Prix
