= 1998 Italian Grand Prix =

Formula One motor race held in 1998

Race 14 of 16 in the 1998 Formula One World Championship
← Previous race	Next race →
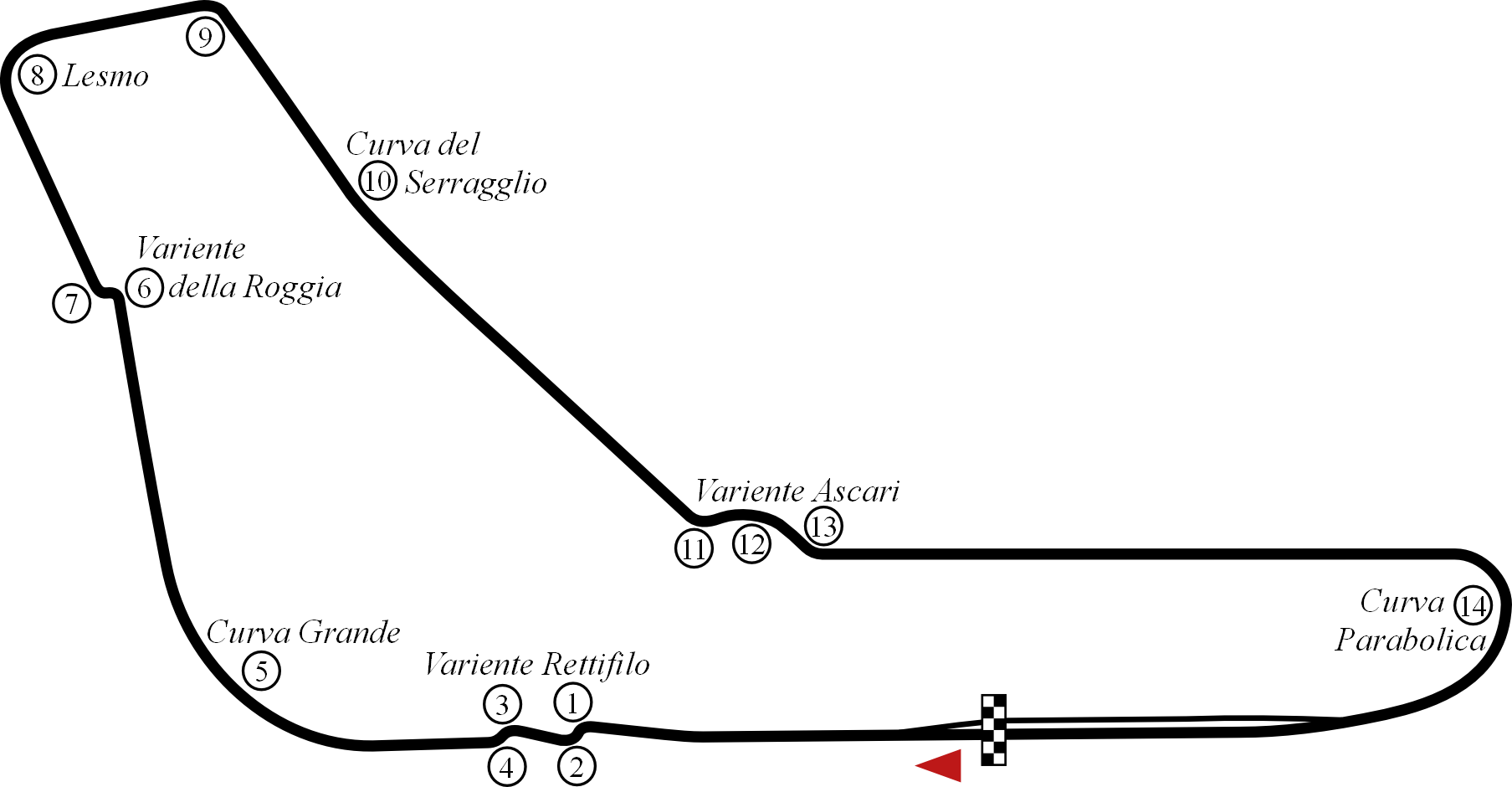
- Autodromo Nazionale di Monza (last modified in 1995)

Race details
- Date: 13 September 1998
- Official name: LIX Gran Premio Campari d'Italia
- Location: Autodromo Nazionale di Monza, Monza, Italy
- Course: Permanent racing facility
- Course length: 5.770 km (3.585 miles)
- Distance: 53 laps, 305.810 km (190.022 miles)
- Weather: Sunny

Pole position
Driver	(Germany) Michael Schumacher	Ferrari
- Time: 1:25.298

Fastest lap
Driver	(Finland) Mika Häkkinen	McLaren-Mercedes
- Time: 1:25.139 on lap 45

Podium
First	(Germany) Michael Schumacher	Ferrari
Second	(United Kingdom) Eddie Irvine	Ferrari
Third	(Germany) Ralf Schumacher	Jordan-Mugen-Honda

The 1998 Italian Grand Prix was a Formula One motor race held at Monza on 13 September 1998. The race was won by Michael Schumacher driving a Ferrari. Schumacher's teammate Eddie Irvine finished second in the other Ferrari and his brother Ralf finished third in a Jordan-Mugen-Honda. As of 2025, this was the last win for tyre manufacturer Goodyear in Formula One.

== Background ==
In August 1998, the organisation of the sporting event was characterised by complications linked to the seizure of several stands and some underpasses by the magistrate's court due to alleged irregularities in the testing certifications. The affair continued until the beginning of September, when the use of the stands for the match was allowed. The event was organised by the Automobile Club of Milan and SIAS, the company in charge of managing the racetrack. For the occasion, new giant screens were installed and the car parks and camping areas were expanded.

Heading into the 14th round of the season, Mika Häkkinen led the championship with 77 points. Michael Schumacher was in second place, seven points behind. Häkkinen's teammate David Coulthard was in third position on 48 points, making these three the only drivers who could mathematically win the title. In the constructors championship, McLaren led on 125 points, ahead of Ferrari on 102. Williams were third with 33 points, one point ahead of Benetton and seven points ahead of Jordan in fifth. Jordan had just achieved a 1–2 finish at the 1998 Belgian Grand Prix, where neither Häkkinen nor Schumacher scored any point; when lapping Coulthard, Schumacher had crashed into the Scot's McLaren, which had not moved off the racing line, obscured by spray. Although he received no penalty or sanction, many were convinced that Coulthard had intentionally caused the collision with Schumacher in order to help his teammate.

== Report ==
=== Qualifying ===
While the free practice on Friday was dry, by the afternoon session it had rained. In a wet qualifying session, Michael Schumacher took pole position ahead of Jacques Villeneuve, who had achieved the team's best qualifying start. Mika Häkkinen, David Coulthard, and Eddie Irvine followed them in third, fourth, and fifth position.

=== Race ===
Mika Häkkinen made a blinding start from third on the grid, pushing his way past Jacques Villeneuve and Michael Schumacher on the front row; at the same time, it was a dreadful start for Schumacher, who fell down to fifth but then passed Villeneuve for fourth and then Eddie Irvine for third. Häkkinen was struggling with a developing brake issue soon after and he waved his teammate David Coulthard through. Soon after, Coulthard's engine blew and seconds later Schumacher, who had caught Häkkinen, passed the Finn when Häkkinen had adjusted his brake bias forwards to cope with the brake problem and ran wide due to the smoke from Coulthard's engine.

Villeneuve, who was running very low downforce, soon spun out of the race, and Häkkinen started catching Schumacher again. Häkkinen was just three seconds behind with a handful of laps remaining when his rear brakes failed, sending him into a wild spin at the Roggia chicane. Although he was able to keep his engine running and kept going, at the beginning of the next lap he went off again at the first Rettifilo chicane, and Irvine reeled him in and took second off him. Ralf Schumacher then caught and overtook Häkkinen, who was able to limp home in fourth.

It was a jubilant scene for the Italian crowd as Schumacher came home first and Irvine, his Ferrari teammate, took second, with the younger Schumacher third. It was Jordan's third podium finishes in two races. Johnny Herbert retired in unusual circumstances; prior to the start, a Sauber mechanic accidentally left a spanner in the cockpit. During the race, the spanner became jammed under the foot pedals, which caused Herbert to crash. Schumacher was now level on points with Häkkinen going into the Nürburgring, the penultimate round, although Häkkinen still led the championship on countback as both drivers had six wins but Häkkinen had two second places against Schumacher's one. This race was Ferrari's 600th start in a World Championship event as a team. (Note: A privateer Ferrari entry in the 1950 French Grand Prix, which is often a source of incorrect count for their races as a team (as opposed to as a manufacturer) is not counted towards the team's participations.)

== Classification ==
=== Qualifying ===
Pos	No	Driver	Constructor	Time	Gap
1	3	(Germany) Michael Schumacher	Ferrari	1:25.289	
2	1	(Canada) Jacques Villeneuve	Williams-Mecachrome	1:25.561	+0.272
3	8	(Finland) Mika Häkkinen	McLaren-Mercedes	1:25.679	+0.390
4	7	(United Kingdom) David Coulthard	McLaren-Mercedes	1:25.987	+0.698
5	4	(United Kingdom) Eddie Irvine	Ferrari	1:26.159	+0.870
6	10	(Germany) Ralf Schumacher	Jordan-Mugen-Honda	1:26.309	+1.020
7	6	(Austria) Alexander Wurz	Benetton-Playlife	1:26.567	+1.278
8	14	(France) Jean Alesi	Sauber-Petronas	1:26.637	+1.348
9	11	(France) Olivier Panis	Prost-Peugeot	1:26.681	+1.392
10	12	(Italy) Jarno Trulli	Prost-Peugeot	1:26.794	+1.505
11	5	(Italy) Giancarlo Fisichella	Benetton-Playlife	1:26.817	+1.528
12	2	(Germany) Heinz-Harald Frentzen	Williams-Mecachrome	1:26.836	+1.547
13	18	(Brazil) Rubens Barrichello	Stewart-Ford	1:27.247	+1.958
14	9	(United Kingdom) Damon Hill	Jordan-Mugen-Honda	1:27.362	+2.073
15	15	(United Kingdom) Johnny Herbert	Sauber-Petronas	1:27.510	+2.221
16	17	(Finland) Mika Salo	Arrows	1:27.744	+2.455
17	19	(Netherlands) Jos Verstappen	Stewart-Ford	1:28.212	+2.923
18	20	(Brazil) Ricardo Rosset	Tyrrell-Ford	1:28.286	+2.997
19	21	(Japan) Toranosuke Takagi	Tyrrell-Ford	1:28.346	+3.057
20	16	(Brazil) Pedro Diniz	Arrows	1:28.387	+3.098
21	22	(Japan) Shinji Nakano	Minardi-Ford	1:29.101	+3.812
22	23	(Argentina) Esteban Tuero	Minardi-Ford	1:29.417	+4.128
107% time: 1:31.259

=== Race ===
Pos	No	Driver	Constructor	Laps	Time/Retired	Grid	Points
1	3	(Germany) Michael Schumacher	Ferrari	53	1:17:09.672	1	10
2	4	(United Kingdom) Eddie Irvine	Ferrari	53	+37.977	5	6
3	10	(Germany) Ralf Schumacher	Jordan-Mugen-Honda	53	+41.152	6	4
4	8	(Finland) Mika Häkkinen	McLaren-Mercedes	53	+55.671	3	3
5	14	(France) Jean Alesi	Sauber-Petronas	53	+1:01.872	8	2
6	9	(United Kingdom) Damon Hill	Jordan-Mugen-Honda	53	+1:06.688	14	1
7	2	(Germany) Heinz-Harald Frentzen	Williams-Mecachrome	52	+1 Lap	12	
8	5	(Italy) Giancarlo Fisichella	Benetton-Playlife	52	+1 Lap	11	
9	21	(Japan) Toranosuke Takagi	Tyrrell-Ford	52	+1 Lap	19	
10	18	(Brazil) Rubens Barrichello	Stewart-Ford	52	+1 Lap	13	
11	23	(Argentina) Esteban Tuero	Minardi-Ford	51	+2 Laps	22	
12	20	(Brazil) Ricardo Rosset	Tyrrell-Ford	51	+2 Laps	18	
13	12	(Italy) Jarno Trulli	Prost-Peugeot	50	+3 Laps	10	
Ret	19	(Netherlands) Jos Verstappen	Stewart-Ford	39	Gearbox	17	
Ret	1	(Canada) Jacques Villeneuve	Williams-Mecachrome	37	Spun off	2	
Ret	17	(Finland) Mika Salo	Arrows	32	Throttle	16	
Ret	6	(Austria) Alexander Wurz	Benetton-Playlife	24	Gearbox	7	
Ret	7	(United Kingdom) David Coulthard	McLaren-Mercedes	16	Engine	4	
Ret	11	(France) Olivier Panis	Prost-Peugeot	15	Vibrations	9	
Ret	22	(Japan) Shinji Nakano	Minardi-Ford	13	Engine	21	
Ret	15	(United Kingdom) Johnny Herbert	Sauber-Petronas	12	Spun off	15	
Ret	16	(Brazil) Pedro Diniz	Arrows	10	Spun off	20	

== Championship standings after the race ==
- **Bold text** indicates who still has a theoretical chance of becoming World Champion.

Drivers' Championship standings

Pos	Driver	Points
1	(Finland) **Mika Häkkinen**	80
2	(Germany) **Michael Schumacher**	80
3	(United Kingdom) David Coulthard	48
4	(United Kingdom) Eddie Irvine	38
5	(Canada) Jacques Villeneuve	20

Constructors' Championship standings

Pos	Constructor	Points
1	(United Kingdom) **McLaren-Mercedes**	128
2	(Italy) **Ferrari**	118
3	(United Kingdom) Williams-Mecachrome	33
4	(Italy) Benetton-Playlife	32
5	(Republic of Ireland) Jordan-Mugen-Honda	31

- Note: Only the top five positions are included for both sets of standings.

== Notes ==
Previous race: 1998 Belgian Grand Prix	FIA Formula One World Championship; 1998 season	Next race: 1998 Luxembourg Grand Prix
Previous race: 1997 Italian Grand Prix	Italian Grand Prix	Next race: 1999 Italian Grand Prix
