= 1998 Japanese Grand Prix =

Final round of the 1998 Formula One World Championship

Race 16 of 16 in the 1998 Formula One World Championship
← Previous race	Next race →

Race details
- Date: 1 November 1998
- Official name: XXIV Fuji Television Japanese Grand Prix
- Location: Suzuka Circuit, Suzuka, Mie, Japan
- Course: Permanent racing facility
- Course length: 5.860 km (3.641 miles)
- Distance: 51 laps, 298.868 km (185.708 miles)
- Scheduled distance: 53 laps, 310.588 km (192.990 miles)
- Weather: Fine
- Attendance: 318,000

Pole position
Driver	(Germany) Michael Schumacher	Ferrari
- Time: 1:36.293

Fastest lap
Driver	(Germany) Michael Schumacher	Ferrari
- Time: 1:40.190 on lap 19

Podium
First	(Finland) Mika Häkkinen	McLaren-Mercedes
Second	(United Kingdom) Eddie Irvine	Ferrari
Third	(United Kingdom) David Coulthard	McLaren-Mercedes

The 1998 Japanese Grand Prix (formally the XXIV Fuji Television Japanese Grand Prix) was a Formula One motor race held at Suzuka, Mie, Japan on 1 November 1998. It was the sixteenth and final round of the 1998 FIA Formula One World Championship. The 51-lap race was won by Mika Häkkinen driving for the McLaren-Mercedes team. Eddie Irvine, driving for Ferrari, finished second with David Coulthard third in the other McLaren. Häkkinen's win confirmed him as 1998 Drivers' Champion as title-rival Michael Schumacher retired with a punctured tyre on Lap 31.

Schumacher started on pole position but stalled on the formation lap, meaning he was forced to start at the back of the grid. Schumacher managed to climb the field during the course of the race and eventually retired from a punctured tyre sustained from running over debris from an incident that occurred previously. This was the last race for the Tyrrell racing team, as the team was rebranded into British American Racing the next season.

This was the last victory for Bridgestone tyres against competition until 2001 Australian Grand Prix.

== Report ==
=== Background ===
Heading into the final race of the season, McLaren driver Mika Häkkinen was leading the Drivers' Championship with 90 points; Ferrari driver Michael Schumacher was second with 86 points. A maximum of 10 points were available for the remaining race, which meant that Schumacher could still win the title. Häkkinen only needed a second-place finish to become Drivers' Champion even if Schumacher won—both drivers would be tied on points and number of victories but Häkkinen would claim the title as he would have finished second place three times, compared to Schumacher's two. Behind Häkkinen and Schumacher in the Drivers' Championship, David Coulthard was third on 52 points in a McLaren, with Eddie Irvine fourth on 41 points in a Ferrari. In the Constructors' Championship, McLaren were leading with 142 points and Ferrari were second with 127 points, with a maximum of 16 points available, meaning Ferrari needed a 1–2 finish with both McLaren finishing outside point-scoring positions to claim the championship (if the two teams were level on points, McLaren would have won on countback due to having more wins than Ferrari).

During the five-week (35 days) break that followed the Luxembourg Grand Prix, Ferrari and McLaren performed private tests that were heavily scheduled. Ferrari concentrated their testing at their private race track at Mugello, while McLaren tested at the Circuit de Catalunya where they were joined by Benetton and Prost, Arrows, and Stewart; new entrants for 1999 BAR and Jordan opted to run at Silverstone. Because of two controversial incidents that decided the 1994 and 1997 World Championships, Schumacher was placed under strict orders from Ferrari president Luca di Montezemolo not to repeat such incidents. After having been involved since their debut in 1965, tyre supplier Goodyear bowed out of Formula One, having been the sport's single tyre supplier for several seasons. Competing manufacturer Bridgestone became the sport's single tyre supplier for the 1999 season.

=== Practice and qualifying ===
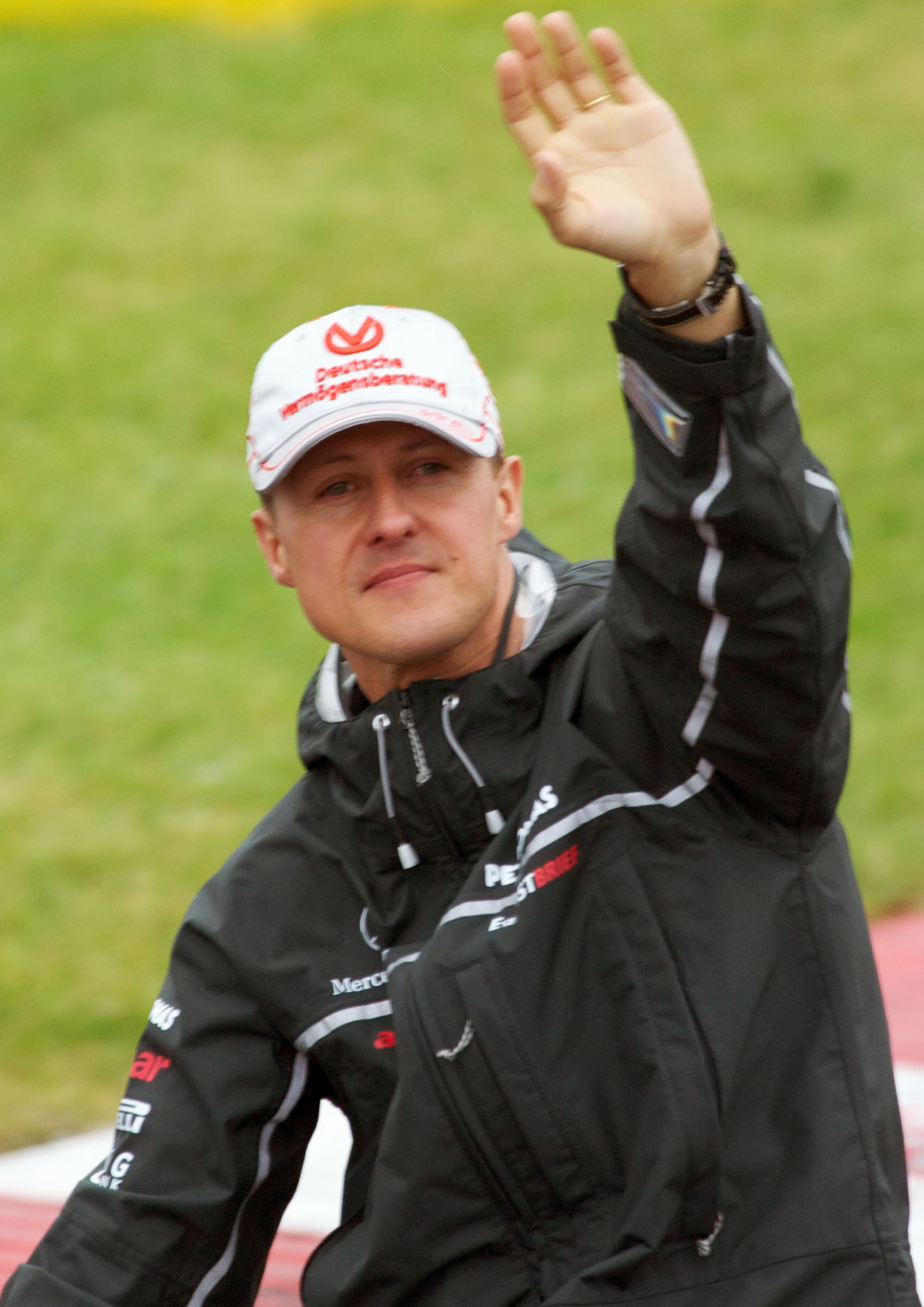
Michael Schumacher took pole position and retired from a punctured tyre in the race (2011 photo).

Two practice sessions were held before the race; the first was held on Friday that was split into two parts and the second on Saturday morning. The first session was held for a total of three hours with the second session lasting two hours. Schumacher set the fastest time in the first practice session with a time of 1:39.823, two-tenths of a second from Jordan driver and brother Ralf Schumacher and Williams driver Heinz-Harald Frentzen. Schumacher's team-mate Irvine was fourth fastest, Häkkinen was fifth fastest with team-mate Coulthard rounding out the top six.

The qualifying session was run as a one-hour session held on Saturday afternoon. Schumacher clinched his third consecutive pole position in his Ferrari, with a time of 1:36.293. He was joined on the front row by Häkkinen, who was one-tenth of a second behind, after not being able to finish his last flying lap by running off in the gravel at the Degner corner. Coulthard was third in the other McLaren. Irvine took fourth in the second Ferrari, with Frentzen taking fifth despite going off into the gravel late in the session.

=== Race ===
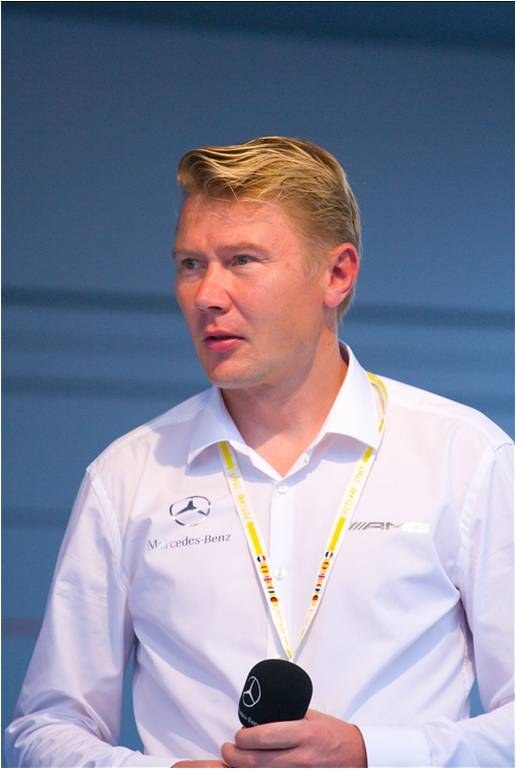
Mika Häkkinen was crowned 1998 Formula One Drivers' Champion as a result of his win at Suzuka (2009 photo).

The start of the race was aborted with the Prost car of Jarno Trulli stalling from 14th position. Before the second attempt to start the race, Schumacher's Ferrari moved forward from his starting position and stalled as he put his car into gear. This promoted Häkkinen into pole position as Schumacher started from the back of the grid.

At the start, Häkkinen pulled away while Irvine overtook Coulthard for second. The Ferrari driver was unable to attack the leading Finn, while Schumacher moved up the order, reaching twelfth place at the end of the first lap. The first retirement was Pedro Diniz, who spun out on lap 3 in the Arrows. By lap four, Schumacher overtook his brother Ralf for seventh but was then stuck behind the fighting former world champions Damon Hill and Jacques Villeneuve. Meanwhile, Ralf Schumacher would eventually retire with engine failure by the end of lap 14. Michael lost thirty seconds in the following laps over race leader Häkkinen, damaging his hopes for victory and the title. After all frontrunners had pitted, Schumacher emerged in third place, having put in some fast laps. On lap 28, Esteban Tuero missed his braking point going into the final corner, crashing into the Tyrrell of Tora Takagi. When Schumacher passed over the debris, he suffered a slow puncture that blew up his right rear tyre three laps later, causing him to retire, an event not shown to UK viewers on ITV due to a poorly timed adbreak, forcing Murray Walker to inform viewers upon the return to the broadcast "And you are now looking at the new World Champion because this is what happened in the break!" This left Häkkinen to take victory and his first drivers' championship. While Irvine succeeded at keeping Coulthard behind him, McLaren were nevertheless able to retain their lead over Ferrari in the constructors' championship. Behind the top three, Hill overtook his future Jordan teammate Frentzen in the final corner to finish fourth; the extra point elevated Jordan ahead of Benetton in the constructors' championship.

=== Post-race ===
After the race, Häkkinen described the situation after the two aborted starts as relieving, saying: "When Michael was forced to start from the back of the grid it raised an enormous amount of pressure from me. The race was not as difficult as others I've had this season. But a lot of that's down to the team who kept letting me know where Eddie and Michael were." Eddie Irvine was quoted saying: "What happened to Michael at the start didn't change our tactics for the race, it destroyed them. When Michael went to the back I knew it was up to me. I made a fantastic start and got close to Mika at some points but just couldn't manage to get in front."

== Classification ==
=== Qualifying ===
Pos.	No.	Driver	Constructor	Time	Gap
1	3	(Germany) Michael Schumacher	Ferrari	1:36.293	—
2	8	(Finland) Mika Häkkinen	McLaren-Mercedes	1:36.471	+0.178
3	7	(United Kingdom) David Coulthard	McLaren-Mercedes	1:37.496	+1.203
4	4	(United Kingdom) Eddie Irvine	Ferrari	1:38.197	+1.904
5	2	(Germany) Heinz-Harald Frentzen	Williams-Mecachrome	1:38.272	+1.979
6	1	(Canada) Jacques Villeneuve	Williams-Mecachrome	1:38.448	+2.155
7	10	(Germany) Ralf Schumacher	Jordan-Mugen-Honda	1:38.461	+2.168
8	9	(United Kingdom) Damon Hill	Jordan-Mugen-Honda	1:38.603	+2.310
9	6	(Austria) Alexander Wurz	Benetton-Playlife	1:38.959	+2.666
10	5	(Italy) Giancarlo Fisichella	Benetton-Playlife	1:39.080	+2.787
11	15	(United Kingdom) Johnny Herbert	Sauber-Petronas	1:39.234	+2.941
12	14	(France) Jean Alesi	Sauber-Petronas	1:39.448	+3.155
13	11	(France) Olivier Panis	Prost-Peugeot	1:40.037	+3.744
14	12	(Italy) Jarno Trulli	Prost-Peugeot	1:40.111	+3.818
15	17	(Finland) Mika Salo	Arrows	1:40.387	+4.094
16	18	(Brazil) Rubens Barrichello	Stewart-Ford	1:40.502	+4.209
17	21	(Japan) Toranosuke Takagi	Tyrrell-Ford	1:40.619	+4.326
18	16	(Brazil) Pedro Diniz	Arrows	1:40.687	+4.394
19	19	(Netherlands) Jos Verstappen	Stewart-Ford	1:40.943	+4.650
20	22	(Japan) Shinji Nakano	Minardi-Ford	1:41.315	+5.022
21	23	(Argentina) Esteban Tuero	Minardi-Ford	1:42.358	+6.065
107% time: 1:43.033
DNQ	20	(Brazil) Ricardo Rosset	Tyrrell-Ford	1:43.259	+6.966

=== Race ===
Pos.	No.	Driver	Constructor	Tyre	Laps	Time/Retired	Grid	Points
1	8	(Finland) Mika Häkkinen	McLaren-Mercedes	B	51	1:27:22.535	2	10
2	4	(United Kingdom) Eddie Irvine	Ferrari	G	51	+6.491	4	6
3	7	(United Kingdom) David Coulthard	McLaren-Mercedes	B	51	+27.662	3	4
4	9	(United Kingdom) Damon Hill	Jordan-Mugen-Honda	G	51	+1:13.491	8	3
5	2	(Germany) Heinz-Harald Frentzen	Williams-Mecachrome	G	51	+1:13.857	5	2
6	1	(Canada) Jacques Villeneuve	Williams-Mecachrome	G	51	+1:15.867	6	1
7	14	(France) Jean Alesi	Sauber-Petronas	G	51	+1:36.053	12	
8	5	(Italy) Giancarlo Fisichella	Benetton-Playlife	B	51	+1:41.302	10	
9	6	(Austria) Alexander Wurz	Benetton-Playlife	B	50	+1 Lap	9	
10	15	(United Kingdom) Johnny Herbert	Sauber-Petronas	G	50	+1 Lap	11	
11	11	(France) Olivier Panis	Prost-Peugeot	B	50	+1 Lap	13	
12	12	(Italy) Jarno Trulli	Prost-Peugeot	B	48	Engine	14	
Ret	22	(Japan) Shinji Nakano	Minardi-Ford	B	40	Throttle	20	
Ret	3	(Germany) Michael Schumacher	Ferrari	G	31	Tyre	1	
Ret	21	(Japan) Toranosuke Takagi	Tyrrell-Ford	G	28	Collision damage	17	
Ret	23	(Argentina) Esteban Tuero	Minardi-Ford	B	28	Collision	21	
Ret	18	(Brazil) Rubens Barrichello	Stewart-Ford	B	25	Hydraulics	16	
Ret	19	(Netherlands) Jos Verstappen	Stewart-Ford	B	21	Gearbox	19	
Ret	17	(Finland) Mika Salo	Arrows	B	14	Hydraulics	15	
Ret	10	(Germany) Ralf Schumacher	Jordan-Mugen-Honda	G	13	Engine	7	
Ret	16	(Brazil) Pedro Diniz	Arrows	B	2	Spun off	18	
DNQ	20	(Brazil) Ricardo Rosset	Tyrrell-Ford	G		107% Rule		

== Championship standings after the race ==
Drivers' Championship standings

Pos	Driver	Points
1	(Finland) **Mika Häkkinen**	100
2	(Germany) Michael Schumacher	86
3	(United Kingdom) David Coulthard	56
4	(United Kingdom) Eddie Irvine	47
5	(Canada) Jacques Villeneuve	21

Constructors' Championship standings

Pos	Constructor	Points
1	(United Kingdom) **McLaren-Mercedes**	156
2	(Italy) Ferrari	133
3	(United Kingdom) Williams-Mecachrome	38
4	(Republic of Ireland) Jordan-Mugen-Honda	34
5	(Italy) Benetton-Playlife	33

- Note: Only the top five positions are included for both sets of standings.
- **Bold text** indicates 1998 World Champions.

Previous race: 1998 Luxembourg Grand Prix	FIA Formula One World Championship; 1998 season	Next race: 1999 Australian Grand Prix
Previous race: 1997 Japanese Grand Prix	Japanese Grand Prix	Next race: 1999 Japanese Grand Prix
