= 1998 Australian Grand Prix =

First round of the 1998 Formula One World Championship

Race 1 of 16 in the 1998 Formula One World Championship
← Previous race	Next race →

Race details
- Date: 8 March 1998
- Official name: 1998 Qantas Australian Grand Prix
- Location: Melbourne Grand Prix Circuit; Albert Park, Melbourne, Australia
- Course: Albert Park Circuit
- Course length: 5.303 km (3.295 miles)
- Distance: 58 laps, 307.574 km (191.118 miles)
- Weather: Clear with maximum temperatures reaching 24 degrees at the start, increasing to 30 degrees by the end of the race.

Pole position
Driver	(Finland) Mika Häkkinen	McLaren-Mercedes
- Time: 1:30.010

Fastest lap
Driver	(Finland) Mika Häkkinen	McLaren-Mercedes
- Time: 1:31.649 on lap 39

Podium
First	(Finland) Mika Häkkinen	McLaren-Mercedes
Second	(United Kingdom) David Coulthard	McLaren-Mercedes
Third	(Germany) Heinz-Harald Frentzen	Williams-Mecachrome

The 1998 Australian Grand Prix (formally the 1998 Qantas Australian Grand Prix) was a Formula One motor race held at the Albert Park street circuit in inner Melbourne on 8 March 1998 at 14:00 AEDT (UTC+10). It was the 63rd race in the combined history of the Australian Grand Prix that dates back to the 100 Miles Road Race of 1928. It was the first of the sixteen races of the 1998 FIA Formula One World Championship and held over 58 laps of the 5.3 kilometre street circuit and the sixth to be held on the Albert Park venue first used in 1953, or the third since the new circuit first hosted the race in 1996.

The race was dominated by the McLaren-Mercedes team and won by Mika Häkkinen over his teammate David Coulthard in controversial circumstances due to team orders. Williams driver Heinz-Harald Frentzen finished third, his only podium finish this season. The race also represented the first win for Japanese tyre manufacturer Bridgestone in Formula One and the first race since the 1991 Canadian Grand Prix not won by Goodyear. Johnny Herbert scored his only point of the season.

== Race summary ==
The McLarens of Mika Häkkinen and David Coulthard made good starts from the front row of the grid. Ferrari's Michael Schumacher, starting third, also had a good start and tried to overtake second place Coulthard. The Ferrari driver stayed with the McLarens but retired on lap 6 when his engine failed. This handed third place to the Williams of Jacques Villeneuve, who was being chased by Benetton's Giancarlo Fisichella. After the first round of pitstops, Villeneuve found himself behind teammate Heinz-Harald Frentzen, Ferrari's Eddie Irvine, and Fisichella. Fisichella was able to pass Frentzen for third but then retired with mechanical failure, leaving Frentzen to finish just ahead of Irvine's Ferrari, which had gambled on a one-stop strategy. Villeneuve was lapped soon after this by the McLarens but still managed to finish in fifth place. All cars except the two McLarens were lapped down.

On lap 36, Häkkinen came into the pits unexpectedly, apparently having misheard a call over the radio. He drove straight through the pitlane and rejoined the race without stopping but lost first place to teammate Coulthard. In 2007, McLaren boss Ron Dennis claimed that someone had tapped into the team's radio system: "We do not and have not manipulated Grands Prix, unless there were some exceptional circumstances, which occurred in Australia [1998], when someone had tapped into our radio and instructed Mika Häkkinen to enter the pits." In 2023, Hakkinen recalled: "The team said something on the radio, I was confused, I thought they asked me to come to change tyres and that was not the case. They were just giving me some different information. So I just drove through the pit lane and I of course lost the lead of the race, David got the lead."

With 16 laps to go, Coulthard had a 12-second lead; by lap 55 of 58, Coulthard's lead was reduced to two seconds. A few laps before the end of the race, Coulthard let Häkkinen past on the front straight. From the pre-season test, it was clear that McLaren had the fastest car but was unreliable. (Note: In 2020, Coulthard recalled: "At that time, team orders were not a common part of Formula One – it's accepted today, but back then it wasn't part of it. We as a team did it for good reason – we had a fast car that had been unreliable in winter testing, so we knew if we pushed at 100 per cent, the chances of finishing were very slim. So to get both cars to the end – even if it was in the wrong order for my liking – was a big success for the team.") Due to those reliability concerns, Hakkinen and Coulthard had made a pre-race agreement that between the two of them, the driver who led at the first corner would go on to win the race, should he be in the position to do so. (Note: In 2023, Hakkinen recalled: "We were sitting on the front row, me and David – and we just made a deal. The driver who was first at the first corner when the race starts, that driver is going to win the Grand Prix. There's not going to be any fight. We had a deal, so David had to let me past – brilliant!") Coulthard and the McLaren team were criticised heavily, leading to discussion about team orders. The situation surrounding Coulthard allowing Häkkinen through would eventually go to the World Motorsport Council. The verdict was that "any future act prejudicial to the interests of competition should be severely punished in accordance with article 151c of International Sporting Code." Team orders continued to be controversial in Formula One and were banned following the events of the 2002 Austrian Grand Prix but were reallowed following the 2010 German Grand Prix. Frentzen took third place for Williams. The race was the first win for the tyre manufacturer Bridgestone after they entered Formula One a year earlier.

After the race concluded, the Australian Grand Prix Corporation chairman Ron Walker lodged an official complaint to the FIA into how the actions of the McLaren team decided the race for Häkkinen.

== Classification ==
=== Qualifying ===
Pos	No	Driver	Constructor	Lap Time	Gap
1	8	(Finland) Mika Häkkinen	McLaren-Mercedes	1:30.010	
2	7	(United Kingdom) David Coulthard	McLaren-Mercedes	1:30.053	+0.043
3	3	(Germany) Michael Schumacher	Ferrari	1:30.767	+0.757
4	1	(Canada) Jacques Villeneuve	Williams-Mecachrome	1:30.919	+0.909
5	15	(United Kingdom) Johnny Herbert	Sauber-Petronas	1:31.384	+1.374
6	2	(Germany) Heinz-Harald Frentzen	Williams-Mecachrome	1:31.397	+1.387
7	5	(Italy) Giancarlo Fisichella	Benetton-Playlife	1:31.733	+1.723
8	4	(United Kingdom) Eddie Irvine	Ferrari	1:31.767	+1.757
9	10	(Germany) Ralf Schumacher	Jordan-Mugen-Honda	1:32.392	+2.382
10	9	(United Kingdom) Damon Hill	Jordan-Mugen-Honda	1:32.399	+2.389
11	6	(Austria) Alexander Wurz	Benetton-Playlife	1:32.726	+2.716
12	14	(France) Jean Alesi	Sauber-Petronas	1:33.240	+3.230
13	21	(Japan) Toranosuke Takagi	Tyrrell-Ford	1:33.291	+3.281
14	18	(Brazil) Rubens Barrichello	Stewart-Ford	1:33.383	+3.373
15	12	(Italy) Jarno Trulli	Prost-Peugeot	1:33.739	+3.729
16	17	(Finland) Mika Salo	Arrows	1:33.927	+3.917
17	23	(Argentina) Esteban Tuero	Minardi-Ford	1:34.646	+4.636
18	19	(Denmark) Jan Magnussen	Stewart-Ford	1:34.906	+4.896
19	20	(Brazil) Ricardo Rosset	Tyrrell-Ford	1:35.119	+5.109
20	16	(Brazil) Pedro Diniz	Arrows	1:35.140	+5.130
21	11	(France) Olivier Panis	Prost-Peugeot	1:35.215	+5.205
22	22	(Japan) Shinji Nakano	Minardi-Ford	1:35.301	+5.291
107% time: 1:36.311

=== Race ===
Pos	No	Driver	Constructor	Laps	Time/Retired	Grid	Points
1	8	(Finland) Mika Häkkinen	McLaren-Mercedes	58	1:31:45.996	1	10
2	7	(United Kingdom) David Coulthard	McLaren-Mercedes	58	+0.702	2	6
3	2	(Germany) Heinz-Harald Frentzen	Williams-Mecachrome	57	+1 Lap	6	4
4	4	(United Kingdom) Eddie Irvine	Ferrari	57	+1 Lap	8	3
5	1	(Canada) Jacques Villeneuve	Williams-Mecachrome	57	+1 Lap	4	2
6	15	(United Kingdom) Johnny Herbert	Sauber-Petronas	57	+1 Lap	5	1
7	6	(Austria) Alexander Wurz	Benetton-Playlife	57	+1 Lap	11	
8	9	(United Kingdom) Damon Hill	Jordan-Mugen-Honda	57	+1 Lap	10	
9	11	(France) Olivier Panis	Prost-Peugeot	57	+1 Lap	21	
Ret	5	(Italy) Giancarlo Fisichella	Benetton-Playlife	43	Broken Wing	7	
Ret	14	(France) Jean Alesi	Sauber-Petronas	41	Engine	12	
Ret	12	(Italy) Jarno Trulli	Prost-Peugeot	26	Gearbox	15	
Ret	20	(Brazil) Ricardo Rosset	Tyrrell-Ford	25	Gearbox	19	
Ret	17	(Finland) Mika Salo	Arrows	23	Gearbox	16	
Ret	23	(Argentina) Esteban Tuero	Minardi-Ford	22	Engine	17	
Ret	22	(Japan) Shinji Nakano	Minardi-Ford	8	Halfshaft	22	
Ret	3	(Germany) Michael Schumacher	Ferrari	5	Engine	3	
Ret	16	(Brazil) Pedro Diniz	Arrows	2	Gearbox	20	
Ret	10	(Germany) Ralf Schumacher	Jordan-Mugen-Honda	1	Collision	9	
Ret	19	(Denmark) Jan Magnussen	Stewart-Ford	1	Collision	18	
Ret	21	(Japan) Toranosuke Takagi	Tyrrell-Ford	1	Spun off	13	
Ret	18	(Brazil) Rubens Barrichello	Stewart-Ford	0	Gearbox	14	

- Pedro Diniz's car caught fire on the way to the grid.

== Championship standings after the race ==
Drivers' Championship standings

Pos	Driver	Points
1	(Finland) Mika Häkkinen	10
2	(United Kingdom) David Coulthard	6
3	(Germany) Heinz-Harald Frentzen	4
4	(United Kingdom) Eddie Irvine	3
5	(Canada) Jacques Villeneuve	2

Constructors' Championship standings

Pos	Constructor	Points
1	(United Kingdom) McLaren-Mercedes	16
2	(United Kingdom) Williams-Mecachrome	6
3	(Italy) Ferrari	3
4	(Switzerland) Sauber-Petronas	1

- Note: Only the top five positions are included for both sets of standings.

== Notes ==
Previous race: 1997 European Grand Prix	FIA Formula One World Championship; 1998 season	Next race: 1998 Brazilian Grand Prix
Previous race: 1997 Australian Grand Prix	Australian Grand Prix	Next race: 1999 Australian Grand Prix
