= 1998 Belgian Grand Prix =

Formula One motor race held in 1998

Race 13 of 16 in the 1998 Formula One World Championship
← Previous race	Next race →
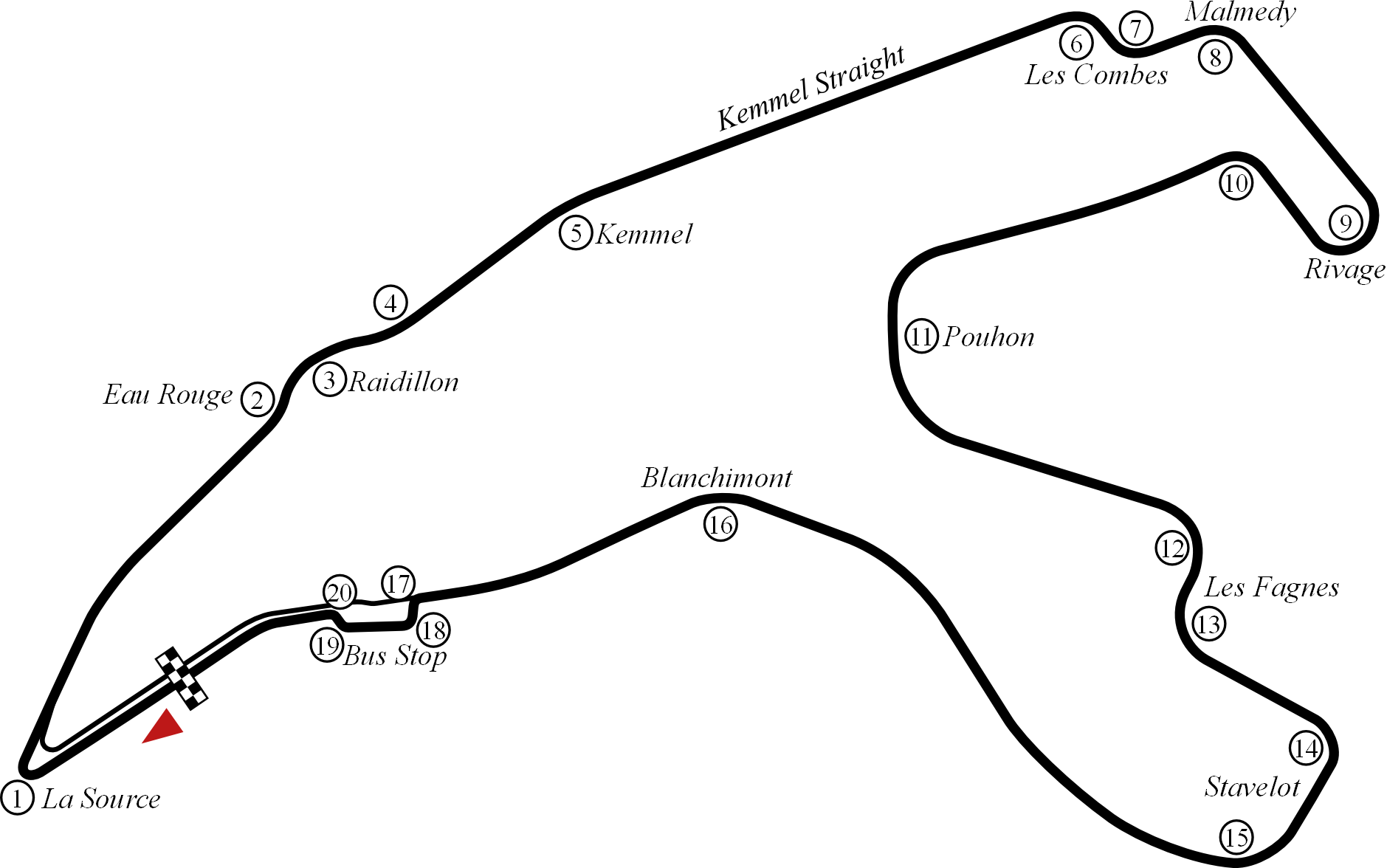

Race details
- Date: 30 August 1998
- Official name: LVI Foster's Belgian Grand Prix
- Location: Circuit de Spa-Francorchamps
- Course: Permanent racing facility
- Course length: 6.968 km (4.330 miles)
- Distance: 44 laps, 306.577 km (190.498 miles)
- Weather: Cold and wet with rain becoming heavier

Pole position
Driver	(Finland) Mika Häkkinen	McLaren-Mercedes
- Time: 1:48.682

Fastest lap
Driver	(Germany) Michael Schumacher	Ferrari
- Time: 2:03.766 on lap 9

Podium
First	(United Kingdom) Damon Hill	Jordan-Mugen-Honda
Second	(Germany) Ralf Schumacher	Jordan-Mugen-Honda
Third	(France) Jean Alesi	Sauber-Petronas

The 1998 Belgian Grand Prix (formally the LVI Foster's Belgian Grand Prix) was a Formula One motor race held on 30 August 1998 at Circuit de Spa-Francorchamps; it was the thirteenth race of the 1998 FIA Formula One World Championship. The race was won by Damon Hill driving for the Jordan team, with Hill's teammate Ralf Schumacher finishing in second place and Jean Alesi finishing in third for the Sauber team, taking his 32nd and last podium of his Formula One career.

The race ran entirely in extremely wet weather, and David Coulthard lost control of his McLaren at the start on the first lap, causing a multiple collision involving thirteen drivers, which led to the race being stopped. After a delay of more than an hour to clear the track, a second attempt was made to start the race, albeit without four of the drivers involved in the incident. At the restart, championship leader and polesitter Mika Häkkinen spun his McLaren at the first corner and was hit by the Sauber of Johnny Herbert, forcing them both to retire from the race. Hill took the lead but was overtaken on lap eight by Michael Schumacher. Schumacher had built up over 30 seconds of advantage over Hill by lap 24 when he came up to lap Coulthard. After being instructed over the team radio to let him past, Coulthard slowed down but stayed on the main racing line; due to the spray behind Coulthard, Schumacher was unsighted, hit the back of the McLaren, and caused terminal damage to his Ferrari. Coulthard initially retired due to damage on his own car but eventually rejoined the race and finished seventh.

Hill inherited the lead again, with his Jordan teammate behind him. In the latter stages of the race, the younger Schumacher was catching Hill. Initially, the team informed Hill about his teammate's pace and implied he should let him past. Hill responded that he would not step down, telling team owner Eddie Jordan they either race for first place and risk ending up with nothing, implying a collision, or hold positions and bring the team a 1–2 finish. As a result, team orders were ultimately issued, requiring both drivers to hold their positions to the finish. Hill brought home the first Formula One win for the Jordan team (the second for Mugen Motorsports engines) after 126 starts, bringing his own win tally to 22. It was also his first win in two years since leaving Williams and would turn out to be his final Formula One win, as well as the 42nd and last podium of his career.

== Report ==
=== Background ===
Heading into the 13th round of the season, Mika Häkkinen led the championship with 77 points. Michael Schumacher was in second place, seven points behind. Häkkinen's teammate David Coulthard was in third position on 48 points, making these three the only drivers who could mathematically win the title. With a maximum of 40 points available for the remaining four races, Eddie Irvine in fourth place could not catch Häkkinen's score, as he was 45 points behind. In the constructors championship, McLaren led on 125 points, ahead of Ferrari on 102. Benetton were in third position with 32 points, which meant they could not catch McLaren or Ferrari with a maximum of 64 points available from the remaining races. Williams in fourth position were two points behind Benetton and Jordan were a further four points behind in fifth.

All the teams, with the exception of Tyrrell, had carried out testing in the time since the previous race in Hungary. McLaren opted to run at both Monza in Italy and Silverstone in the United Kingdom. Also present at Silverstone were the Williams, Arrows, and Stewart teams, with Williams test driver Juan Pablo Montoya setting the fastest time of those present at the circuit. Ferrari opted to run at both Monza and their own Fiorano Circuit in Maranello, Italy. Jordan were also present at Monza, although it was Coulthard for McLaren who set the fastest time at this circuit. Sauber and Minardi opted to join Ferrari at Fiorano, whilst the Benetton and Prost teams travelled to Magny-Cours, France, and Barcelona, Spain, respectively, to conduct private testing.

=== Practice and qualifying ===
Three practice sessions were held before the race; two on Friday and a third on Saturday morning. All three sessions were scheduled to run for one hour. David Coulthard was fastest in the first session, ahead of teammate Mika Häkkinen who finished second despite a crash late in the session. The Ferrari and Williams cars occupied the remaining top six positions; Ferrari drivers Michael Schumacher and Eddie Irvine third and fifth, respectively. The Williams were fourth and sixth fastest, with Jacques Villeneuve ahead of Heinz-Harald Frentzen. Schumacher lapped fastest in the second practice session, with the two McLarens second (Häkkinen) and third (Coulthard). Damon Hill driving for Jordan placed fourth. Villeneuve was involved in an incident when he lost control of his car at 290 km/h whilst negotiating the Eau Rouge corner. The session was halted for 25 minutes whilst his car was recovered. Although Villeneuve was taken to the medical centre at the circuit, he was not injured. It was described as his "biggest crash in F1 so far".

In the third practice session held on the Saturday, McLaren were again the fastest cars with Häkkinen and Coulthard finishing the session with the first and second fastest times, respectively. Hill finished the session third, whilst Villeneuve finished in fourth place driving what was originally designated the Williams spare car after the damage caused to his original car on Friday. The Ferraris of Schumacher and Irvine were fifth and sixth, respectively. During the session, Mika Salo crashed heavily at Eau Rouge, and was taken to hospital as a precaution but was cleared to take part in qualifying. The qualifying session took the form of a one-hour session held on Saturday afternoon. with each driver permitted to complete up to twelve laps. Häkkinen clinched his ninth pole position of the 1998 season with a time of 1:48.682. McLaren teammate Coulthard joined him on the front row, with a best time just under two-tenths of second slower than that of Häkkinen, the two drivers both having held the fastest lap at different points throughout the session. Hill qualified in third position, his highest of the season, with a time that was over a second slower than that of Häkkinen but three tenths faster than Schumacher. Schumacher, Häkkinen's main rival for the championship, qualified in fourth position despite having his fastest laptime deleted, as the stewards decided he failed to slow down sufficiently when passing a yellow flag, which indicates a hazard on the track. In the event, it did not affect his position, as his fastest laptime would still have only been good enough for fourth position. Schumacher's Ferrari teammate Irvine finished the session fifth fastest and Villeneuve was sixth.

=== Race ===
Race day was very wet and Michael Schumacher was fastest in the morning warm-up session. Despite the heavy, moonsoon-like rain, it was decided that the race would start at the scheduled time without a safety car, unlike the previous season's race. At the start, Mika Häkkinen led from a fast-starting Jacques Villeneuve, Schumacher, and Giancarlo Fisichella. Behind them, David Coulthard suddenly emerged from the opaque spray at a right angle to the racing line and hit the trackside wall. At the time, Coulthard claimed he had made contact with Eddie Irvine but has since said "the reality is I just dropped a wheel onto the metal grille". The McLaren rebounded directly into the path of the oncoming field, causing a chain reaction that took out eleven drivers, which was almost the entire race field, as it took out more than half the field; this became one of the most famous or infamous Formula One incidents and moments, and came to be labelled "The Great Pileup". Some drivers, including the Jordans of Damon Hill and Ralf Schumacher and Esteban Tuero of Minardi, managed to get through unscathed. Hill was just a few metres ahead of the carnage while his teammate was behind. Drivers involved in the crash along with Coulthard included Eddie Irvine (Ferrari), Alexander Wurz (Benetton), Rubens Barrichello (Stewart), Johnny Herbert (Sauber), Olivier Panis (Prost), Jarno Trulli (Prost), Mika Salo (Arrows), Pedro Diniz (Arrows), Toranosuke Takagi (Tyrrell), Ricardo Rosset (Tyrrell) and Shinji Nakano (Minardi). Jos Verstappen managed to get his Stewart back to the pits but it was too badly damaged to continue. The race was stopped before the end of the first lap in order to allow the damaged cars to be recovered and the track to be cleared.

The race start's pile up was the biggest first lap incident since the 1973 British Grand Prix caused eleven cars to retire. All those involved in the incident were eligible to take place in the second start, as the regulations in force at the time stated that should any race be stopped within the first two laps, the start would be null and void, and a full restart over the original distance would take place. Both Irvine and Barrichello had sustained minor injuries; while Irvine restarted, Barrichello did not. Three teams had both of their cars damaged, each only had one spare car available, which meant Salo, Rosset, and Panis could not restart as their teams decided to provide the spare car to their teammates. In total, four drivers did not take the second start. The second attempt to start the race took place nearly an hour after the first. At the start, Hill took the lead of a Grand Prix for the first time since the 1997 Hungarian Grand Prix. Championship leaders Häkkinen and Schumacher battled for position at the first corner, where Häkkinen lost control of his car, and was hit by Herbert's Sauber, forcing both Häkkinen and Herbert to retire from the race. Also during the first lap, Coulthard and Alexander Wurz collided, the damage resulted in Wurz being out of the race while Coulthard rejoined in last position. The safety car was deployed to slow the competitors down and allow Häkkinen's car, which was stranded in the middle of the track, to be safely recovered. The safety car was withdrawn at the end of the second lap, with Hill continuing to lead from Schumacher after the resumption of the race. Hill retained the lead until the eighth lap, when Schumacher overtook him at the Bus Stop. Irvine then lost his front wing in an off-track excursion, dropping him from third to eleventh place as he pitted for repairs.

As the race intensified, Villeneuve spun out having briefly taken the lead during the first round of pitstops. Schumacher retained his lead and was nearly 40 seconds ahead of Hill when he came up to lap Coulthard. Jean Todt had already paid a visit to the McLaren pitwall to ensure that Coulthard would move over. In the other race-defining moment, Coulthard did not let Schumacher by immediately, causing the Ferrari driver to shake his fist at the Scot. As the cars came down the hill towards Pouhon, Coulthard attempted to let Schumacher through by lifting off to reduce his speed. Crucially, he had not moved off the racing line, and in very poor visibility, obscured by the spray, Schumacher slammed straight into the back of the McLaren, tearing off the right-front wheel of the Ferrari and removing the rear wing of the McLaren. Both cars made it back to the pits; Schumacher immediately got out of his car and made his way to the McLaren garage. Convinced that Coulthard was at fault, According to Coulthard's version of events, Schumacher accused Coulthard of "trying to fucking kill me", and also threatened to kill Coulthard. Many were convinced Coulthard did it intentionally in order to help his teammate.

Damon Hill: I'm going to put something to you here, and I think you'd better listen to this. If we race, if we two race, we could end up with nothing, so it's up to Eddie [Jordan]. If we don't race each other, we've got an opportunity to get a first and second, it's your choice.

— Hill's radio message to the Jordan pitwall

After Ferrari and McLaren team personnel separated the two drivers, Schumacher then went to the stewards' office to protest. As the race continued, the stewards considered Schumacher's protest. At the time, they found no case against Coulthard, and the stewards further requested an explanation for why the German had driven into Coulthard's spray in the first place after Coulthard had moved aside to let him through. Coulthard later rejoined the race after his rear wing was replaced. As a result of Schumacher's retirement, Hill had taken the lead of the Grand Prix ahead of his teammate. On the same lap, Irvine spun out of the race, ending Ferrari's interest in the race. One lap later, Fisichella's Benetton hit the back of Nakano's Minardi, ripping both the front wheels from the Benetton and damaging the back of the Minardi. The Benetton brushed against the end of the pitwall and caught fire as it came to a stop, which was quickly extinguished. Both drivers were unharmed but the incident resulted in the safety car again being deployed, and Hill immediately made his second pitstop to take advantage, retaining his lead. At this stage of the race, only six cars were running, meaning every car was in a position to score world championship points. This led to both Coulthard and Nakano rejoining the race after lengthy repairs to their cars in a bid to get a world championship point should there be any further retirements.

As the race resumed, Hill led his teammate, with Jean Alesi close behind in third. It was then just a matter of counting down the laps to the finish for the Jordan team and it was Hill who took his 22nd and final Grand Prix victory, handing Jordan their first ever Grand Prix victory at the circuit where they gained their first pole position in 1994 and finished second in 1997. It later emerged that team orders had been issued preventing the younger Schumacher from overtaking Hill. The race has been variously described as controversial, the season's "best bit", "undoubtedly the most incident packed, exciting and historic race since the 1997 title-decider at Jerez", and "one of Formula 1's greatest-ever wet races", and it has been called "one of the most dramatic races ever", as well as "one of the most remarkable F1 races ever".

=== Post-race ===
During the podium ceremony, there was confusion when "God Save the Queen", the British national anthem, was played for winning constructor Jordan instead of "Amhrán na bhFiann", the Irish national anthem. Although Jordan was based in the United Kingdom, its Formula One team's nationality reflected its Irish ownership as well as its racing licence which was issued by the Irish national racing authority. When Heinz-Harald Frentzen recorded Jordan's second win at the 1999 French Grand Prix, the Irish anthem was played.

Following the revelation that Eddie Jordan had ordered Ralf Schumacher not to overtake Damon Hill, amid the post-race celebrations his brother Michael Schumacher angrily confronted Jordan in his motorhome, telling him that his brother would not race for his team again and bought out his contract for £2 million. In the next season, the younger Schumacher moved to Williams.

One week after the race, Schumacher and Coulthard had a one and a half-hour private meeting and emerged shaking hands vowing to join up to combat for clearer guidelines when lapping and overtaking. Schumacher later said: "It's clear he [Coulthard] did nothing wrong at Spa." In 2003, Coulthard admitted for the first time the crash at Spa was his fault. He said: "The reality is that I lifted to let him pass me, but I lifted in heavy spray on the racing line. You should never do that. I would never do that now." Schumacher thanked Coulthard for agreeing with him about the incident, and commented: "I'm glad he finally shares the same opinion as me on this incident. It happened a long time ago and there is nothing more to say about it. But it's nice to hear him admit it."

== Classification ==
=== Qualifying ===
Pos	No	Driver	Constructor	Time	Gap
1	8	(Finland) Mika Häkkinen	McLaren-Mercedes	1:48.682	—
2	7	(United Kingdom) David Coulthard	McLaren-Mercedes	1:48.845	+0.163
3	9	(United Kingdom) Damon Hill	Jordan-Mugen-Honda	1:49.728	+1.046
4	3	(Germany) Michael Schumacher	Ferrari	1:50.027	+1.345
5	4	(United Kingdom) Eddie Irvine	Ferrari	1:50.189	+1.507
6	1	(Canada) Jacques Villeneuve	Williams-Mecachrome	1:50.204	+1.522
7	5	(Italy) Giancarlo Fisichella	Benetton-Playlife	1:50.462	+1.780
8	10	(Germany) Ralf Schumacher	Jordan-Mugen-Honda	1:50.501	+1.819
9	2	(Germany) Heinz-Harald Frentzen	Williams-Mecachrome	1:50.686	+2.004
10	14	(France) Jean Alesi	Sauber-Petronas	1:51.189	+2.507
11	6	(Austria) Alexander Wurz	Benetton-Playlife	1:51.648	+2.966
12	15	(United Kingdom) Johnny Herbert	Sauber-Petronas	1:51.851	+3.169
13	12	(Italy) Jarno Trulli	Prost-Peugeot	1:52.572	+3.890
14	18	(Brazil) Rubens Barrichello	Stewart-Ford	1:52.670	+3.988
15	11	(France) Olivier Panis	Prost-Peugeot	1:52.784	+4.102
16	16	(Brazil) Pedro Diniz	Arrows	1:53.037	+4.355
17	19	(Netherlands) Jos Verstappen	Stewart-Ford	1:53.149	+4.467
18	17	(Finland) Mika Salo	Arrows	1:53.207	+4.525
19	21	(Japan) Toranosuke Takagi	Tyrrell-Ford	1:53.237	+4.555
20	20	(Brazil) Ricardo Rosset	Tyrrell-Ford	1:54.850	+6.168
21	22	(Japan) Shinji Nakano	Minardi-Ford	1:55.084	+6.402
22	23	(Argentina) Esteban Tuero	Minardi-Ford	1:55.520	+6.838
107% time: 1:56.290

=== Race ===
Pos	No	Driver	Constructor	Tyre	Laps	Time/Retired	Grid	Points
1	9	(United Kingdom) Damon Hill	Jordan-Mugen-Honda	G	44	1:43:47.407	3	10
2	10	(Germany) Ralf Schumacher	Jordan-Mugen-Honda	G	44	+0.932	8	6
3	14	(France) Jean Alesi	Sauber-Petronas	G	44	+7.240	10	4
4	2	(Germany) Heinz-Harald Frentzen	Williams-Mecachrome	G	44	+32.243	9	3
5	16	(Brazil) Pedro Diniz	Arrows	B	44	+51.682	16	2
6	12	(Italy) Jarno Trulli	Prost-Peugeot	B	42	+2 laps	13	1
7	7	(United Kingdom) David Coulthard	McLaren-Mercedes	B	39	+5 laps	2	
8	22	(Japan) Shinji Nakano	Minardi-Ford	B	39	+5 laps	21	
Ret	5	(Italy) Giancarlo Fisichella	Benetton-Playlife	B	26	Collision	7	
Ret	3	(Germany) Michael Schumacher	Ferrari	G	25	Collision/Wheel	4	
Ret	4	(United Kingdom) Eddie Irvine	Ferrari	G	25	Spun off	5	
Ret	23	(Argentina) Esteban Tuero	Minardi-Ford	B	17	Gearbox	22	
Ret	1	(Canada) Jacques Villeneuve	Williams-Mecachrome	G	16	Spun off	6	
Ret	21	(Japan) Toranosuke Takagi	Tyrrell-Ford	G	10	Spun off	19	
Ret	19	(Netherlands) Jos Verstappen	Stewart-Ford	B	8	Engine	17	
Ret	8	(Finland) Mika Häkkinen	McLaren-Mercedes	B	0	Collision	1	
Ret	6	(Austria) Alexander Wurz	Benetton-Playlife	B	0	Collision	11	
Ret	15	(United Kingdom) Johnny Herbert	Sauber-Petronas	G	0	Collision	12	
DNS	18	(Brazil) Rubens Barrichello	Stewart-Ford	B	0	Collision^{1}	15	
DNS	11	(France) Olivier Panis	Prost-Peugeot	B	0	Collision^{1}	14	
DNS	17	(Finland) Mika Salo	Arrows	B	0	Collision^{1}	18	
DNS	20	(Brazil) Ricardo Rosset	Tyrrell-Ford	G	0	Collision^{1}	20	

Notes

- ^1 – Barrichello, Panis, Salo, and Rosset are all listed as "Did Not Start" (DNS) in the official results despite having taken the first start prior to the race being stopped. Regulations at the time were such that, in the event of a stoppage being ordered on the first lap, the original start would be deemed null and void, and the second start would take place as if the first had never occurred. As these four drivers did not make the second start, they are classified as DNS.

== Championship standings after the race ==
- **Bold text** indicates who still has a theoretical chance of becoming World Champion.

Drivers' Championship standings

Pos	Driver	Points
1	(Finland) **Mika Häkkinen***	77
2	(Germany) **Michael Schumacher***	70
3	(United Kingdom) **David Coulthard***	48
4	(United Kingdom) Eddie Irvine	32
5	(Canada) Jacques Villeneuve	20

Constructors' Championship standings

Pos	Constructor	Points
1	(United Kingdom) **McLaren-Mercedes***	125
2	(Italy) **Ferrari***	102
3	(United Kingdom) Williams-Mecachrome	33
4	(Italy) Benetton-Playlife	32
5	(Republic of Ireland) Jordan-Mugen-Honda	26

- Note: Only the top five positions are included for both sets of standings.

Previous race: 1998 Hungarian Grand Prix	FIA Formula One World Championship; 1998 season	Next race: 1998 Italian Grand Prix
Previous race: 1997 Belgian Grand Prix	Belgian Grand Prix	Next race: 1999 Belgian Grand Prix
