= Benetton B198 =

Formula One racing car

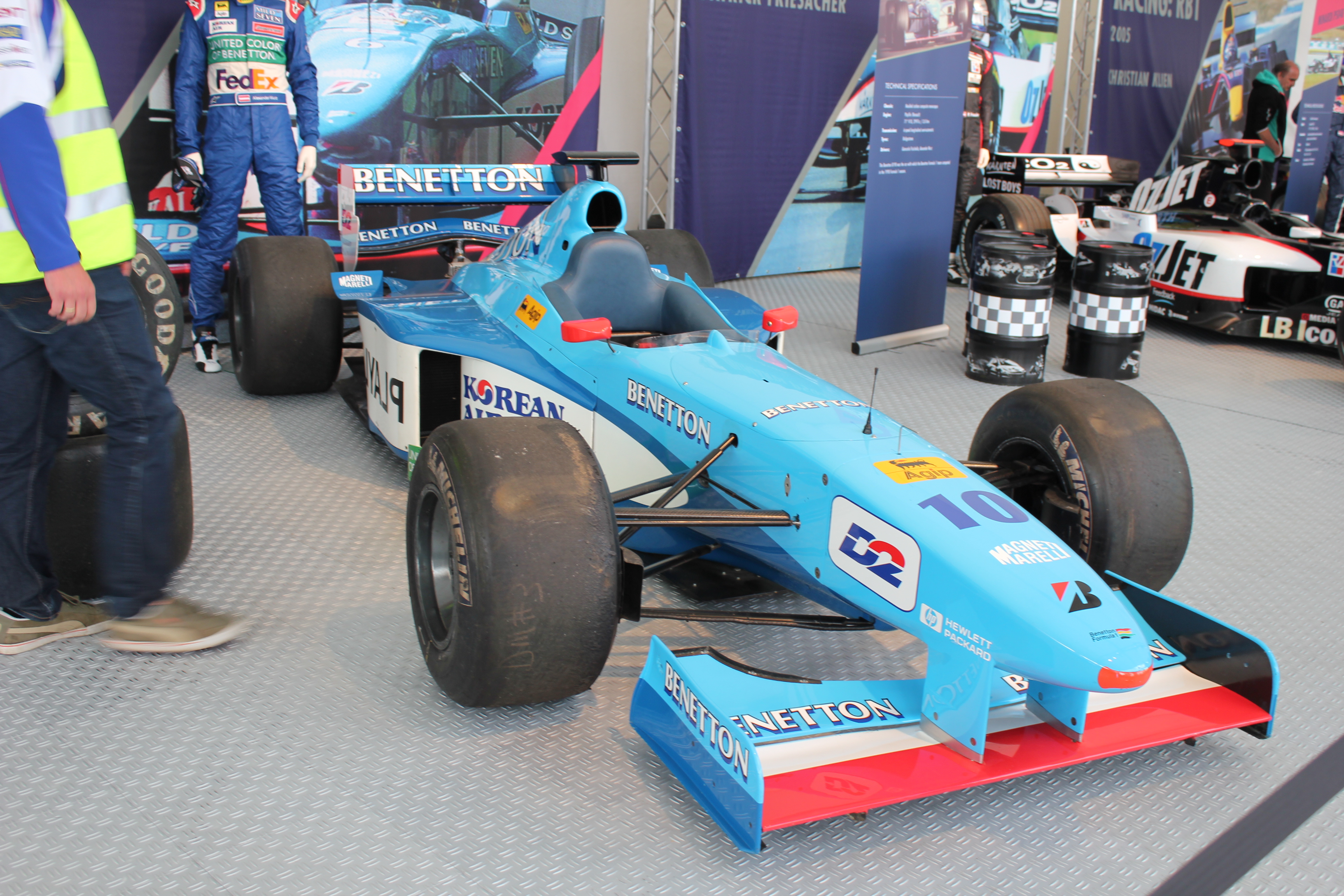
- The B198
- Category: Formula One
- Constructor: Benetton
- Designers: Pat Symonds (Technical Director); Nick Wirth (Chief Designer); James Allison (Head of Aerodynamics)
- Predecessor: B197
- Successor: B199

Technical specifications
- Chassis: Moulded carbon composite monocoque
- Suspension (front): Double carbon wishbones, pushrod, triple damper
- Suspension (rear): Double wishbones, pushrod, double damper
- Engine: Playlife (Renault RS9) 3.0L 71° V10 NA Mid-engine
- Transmission: Benetton 6-speed longitudinal sequential semi-automatic
- Power: 750 hp (559 kW) @ 14,000 rpm
- Fuel: Agip
- Tyres: Bridgestone

Competition history
- Notable entrants: Mild Seven Benetton-Playlife
- Notable drivers: 5. (Italy) Giancarlo Fisichella; 6. (Austria) Alexander Wurz
- Debut: 1998 Australian Grand Prix
- Last event: 1998 Japanese Grand Prix
Races	Wins	Podiums	Poles	F/Laps
16	0	2	1	1

The Benetton B198 was the car with which the Benetton Formula One team competed in the 1998 Formula One World Championship. It was driven by Italian Giancarlo Fisichella, who had moved from Jordan, and Austrian Alexander Wurz, who was in his first full season of F1 after deputising for the unwell Gerhard Berger for three races in 1997.

== Overview ==
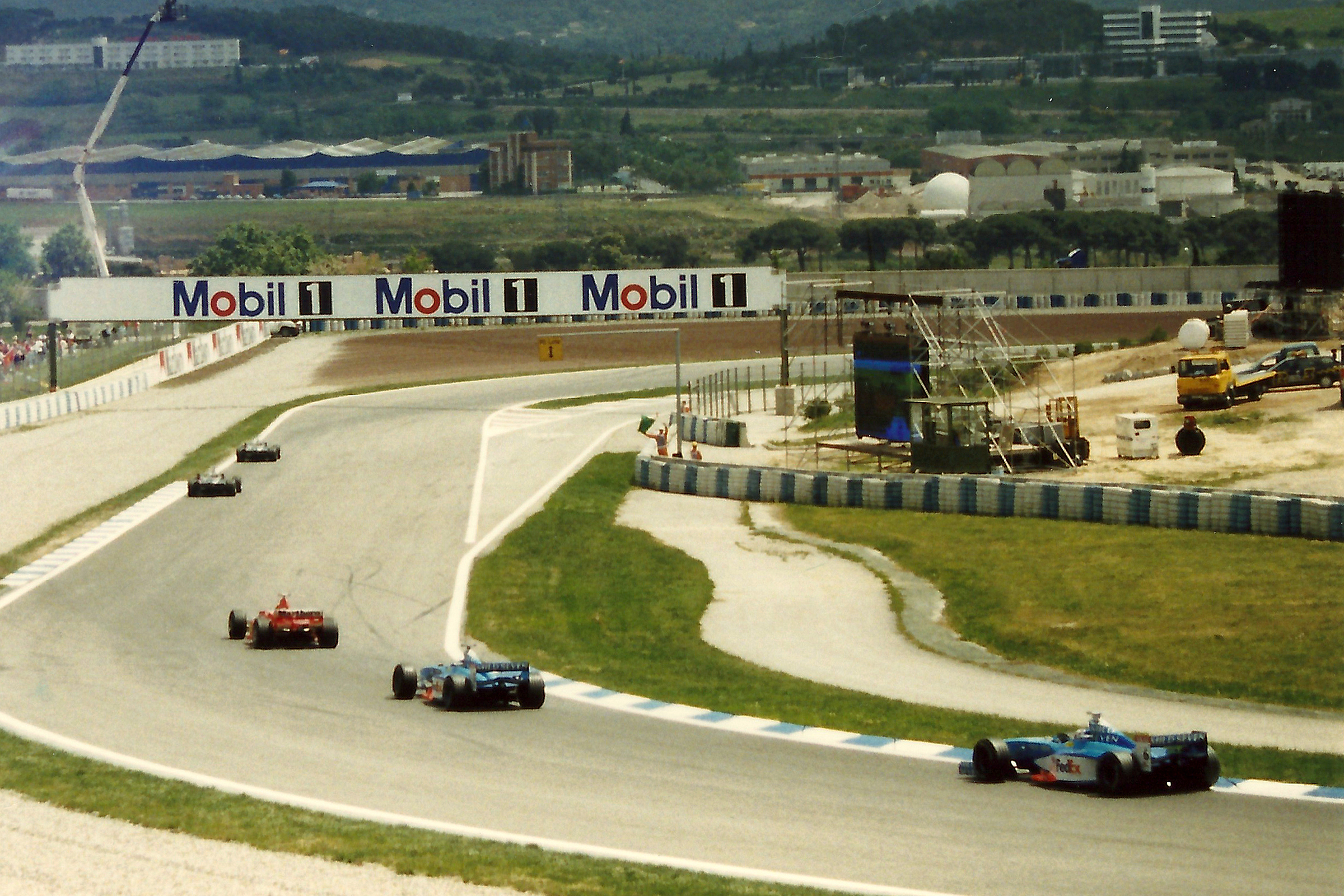
The B198s in their original livery at the 1998 Spanish Grand Prix. Fisichella is in front, Wurz follows.

For much of the season, Benetton held third place in the Constructors' Championship, behind only McLaren and Ferrari, after Fisichella finished second in both Monaco and Canada and took pole position in Austria, while Wurz finished fourth five times and took the fastest lap in Argentina. However, the team scored just one point in the final seven races (Fisichella finishing sixth at the Luxembourg Grand Prix) and ultimately fell to fifth in the Constructors' Championship, behind Williams and Jordan, placing some blame with Bridgestone for favouring eventual champions McLaren, the tyre supplier's top team at that time.

== Livery ==
The livery for B198 was completely changed with the blue colour on the top, white on the sides and red accents. A new sponsor joined for the team was D2.

Benetton used the 'Mild Seven' logos, except at the French, British and German Grands Prix.

== Complete Formula One results ==
(key) (results in bold indicate pole position; results in italics indicate fastest lap)

Year	Entrant	Engine	Tyres	Drivers	1	2	3	4	5	6	7	8	9	10	11	12	13	14	15	16	Points	WCC
1998	Mild Seven Benetton Playlife*	Playlife V10	**B**		AUS	BRA	ARG	SMR	ESP	MON	CAN	FRA	GBR	AUT	GER	HUN	BEL	ITA	LUX	JPN	**33**	**5th**
1998	Mild Seven Benetton Playlife*	Playlife V10	**B**	Giancarlo Fisichella	Ret	6	7	Ret	Ret	2	2	9	5	**Ret**	7	8	Ret	8	6	8	**33**	**5th**
1998	Mild Seven Benetton Playlife*	Playlife V10	**B**	Alexander Wurz	7	4	4	Ret	4	Ret	4	5	4	9	11	16	Ret	Ret	7	9	**33**	**5th**

* Denotes Mecachrome-built engines, badged as Playlife
