= Benetton B199 =

Formula One racing car

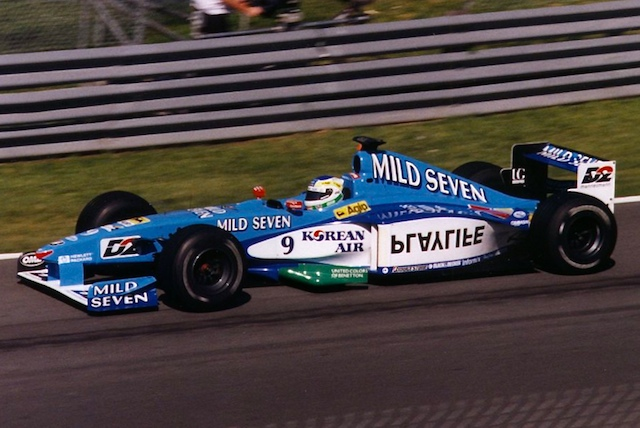
- Giancarlo Fisichella driving the B199 at the 1999 Canadian Grand Prix
- Category: Formula One
- Constructor: Benetton
- Designers: Pat Symonds (Technical Director); Nick Wirth (Chief Designer); James Allison (Head of Aerodynamics)
- Predecessor: B198
- Successor: B200

Technical specifications
- Chassis: Moulded carbon fibre/honeycomb composite structure moulded in upper and lower halves, with four lateral bulkheads
- Suspension (front): Double wishbones, pushrod
- Suspension (rear): Double wishbones, pushrod
- Engine: Playlife (Supertec/Renault) FB01, 71-degree V10
- Transmission: Benetton six-speed longitudinal sequential semi-automatic
- Power: 750 hp @ 14,000 rpm
- Fuel: Agip
- Tyres: Bridgestone

Competition history
- Notable entrants: Mild Seven Benetton Playlife
- Notable drivers: 9. (Italy) Giancarlo Fisichella; 10. (Austria) Alexander Wurz
- Debut: 1999 Australian Grand Prix
- Last event: 1999 Japanese Grand Prix
Races	Wins	Podiums	Poles	F/Laps
16	0	1	0	0
- Constructors' Championships: 0
- Drivers' Championships: 0

The Benetton B199 was the car with which the Benetton team competed in the 1999 Formula One World Championship. It was driven by Italian Giancarlo Fisichella and Austrian Alexander Wurz, who were both in their second full seasons with the team. Frenchman Laurent Redon was the team test driver.

== Design and development ==
The B199 was officially launched in January, 1999 at Enstone by company CEO Rocco Benetton. It was the second car designed by Nick Wirth, who was quoted during the launch as stating the B199 was significantly more aggressive in design than the B198 from the previous season. In late 1998, Benetton had introduced a new wind tunnel on site, and added new sophisticated parts including a front-torque transfer system, and a twin-clutch gearbox. As the team had retained both Fisichella and Wurz from 1998, both drivers were heavily involved in testing and development of the new car. As in previous seasons, the car was dominated by Mild Seven sponsorship and finished in the company's sky blue colour.

The engines were manufactured by Supertec in an effort between the themselves, Renault and Mecachrome. However, as in 1998 they were badged Playlife to represent one of the Benetton Group companies.

The B199 was extensively tested during pre-season. In Barcelona, the cars were very much in the midfield. By the final Friday of the January test, Fisichella was nearly 2 seconds slower than David Coulthard's McLaren. During February, development tests ran at Silverstone. The team would also take part in car development tests in June at the circuit, ahead of the British Grand Prix. This gave Redon an opportunity in the car. Over 14 days of testing pre season, the cars completed 4127km.

== Racing performance ==
At the first round in Australia, the cars qualified in 7th and 10th putting them firmly in the midfield. Fisichella was three tenths off Ferrari driver Eddie Irvine's fastest lap, however both cars were around 2 seconds slower than pole-sitter Mika Hakkinen. In the race, Fisichella managed to finish in 4th, whilst Wurz retired with suspension failure. The team failed to score points at the next round in Brazil, whilst Fisichella managed a fifth place at San Marino. It was Monaco before both cars scored points at the same race, and Wurz got off the mark with a 5th and 6th place respectively.

The B199's crowning moment would come in Canada. Fisichella scored a podium with a second-place finish in the race after starting 7th on the grid.

The remainder of the season would be a myriad of retirements through failures or accidents for the team. The final points scored were at the British Grand Prix, with Wurz managing 5th place. The team would finish the season with 16 points, meaning 6th in the Constructors Championship, their worst finish since Benetton's debut season in 1986.

== Livery ==
The B199 livery is mostly similar to its predecessor apart from its retaining sponsors. The red accents from the Japanese consumer products Akai were removed.

Benetton used the Mild Seven logos, except at the French, British and Belgian Grands Prix, where they were replaced with "Benetton".

== Complete Formula One results ==
(key) (results in bold indicate pole position)

Year	Entrant	Engine	Tyres	Drivers	1	2	3	4	5	6	7	8	9	10	11	12	13	14	15	16	Points	WCC
1999	Mild Seven Benetton Playlife	Playlife FB01 V10*	**B**		AUS	BRA	SMR	MON	ESP	CAN	FRA	GBR	AUT	GER	HUN	BEL	ITA	EUR	MAL	JPN	**16**	**6th**
1999	Mild Seven Benetton Playlife	Playlife FB01 V10*	**B**	Giancarlo Fisichella	4	Ret	5	5	9	2	Ret	7	12^{†}	Ret	Ret	11	Ret	Ret	11	14^{†}	**16**	**6th**
1999	Mild Seven Benetton Playlife	Playlife FB01 V10*	**B**	Alexander Wurz	Ret	7	Ret	6	10	Ret	Ret	10	5	7	7	14	Ret	Ret	8	10	**16**	**6th**

* Denotes Supertec-built engines, badged as Playlife
