= 1998 British Grand Prix =

Race 9 of 16 in the 1998 Formula One World Championship
← Previous race	Next race →
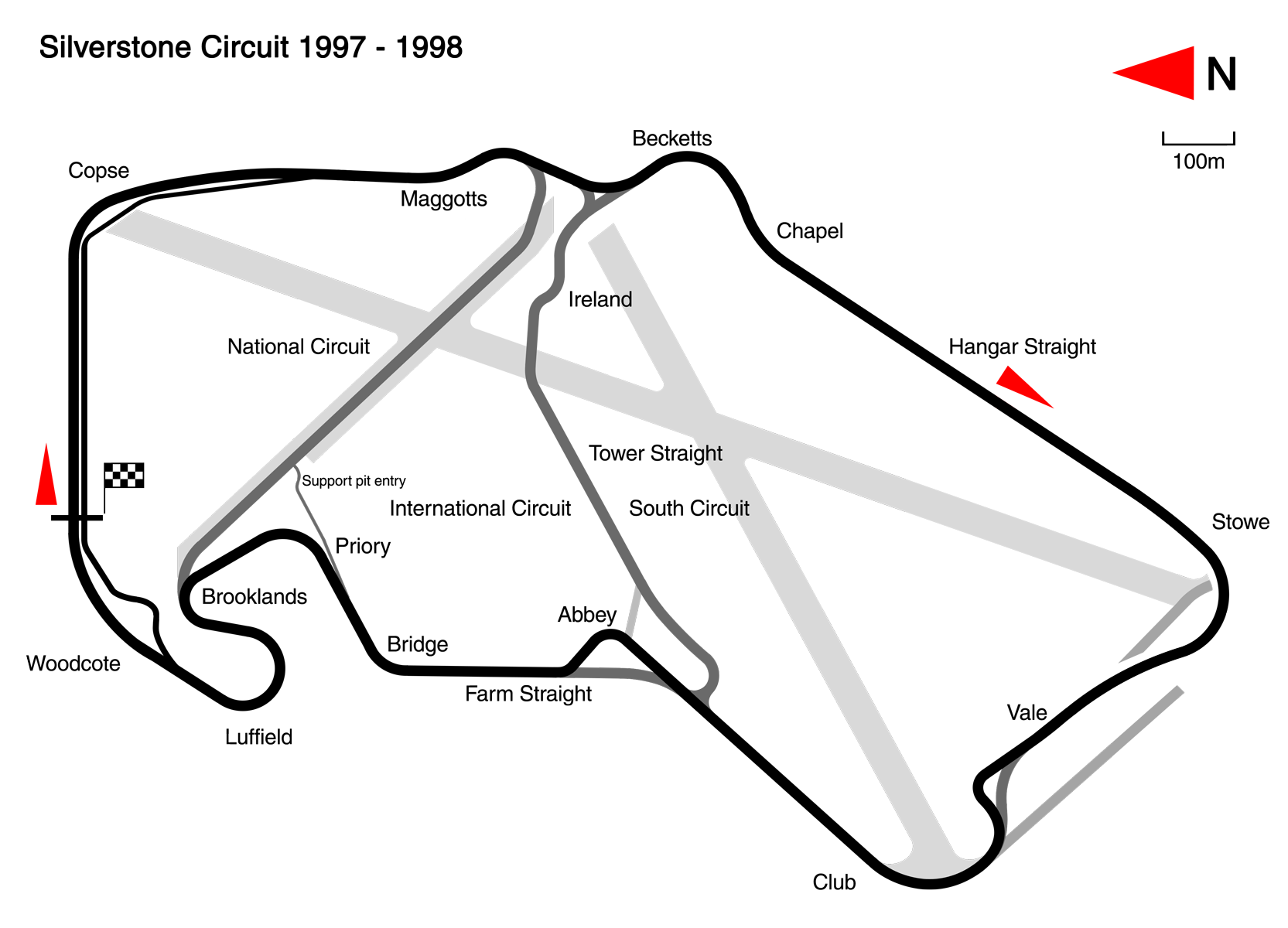
- Silverstone Circuit in its 1998 configuration

Race details
- Date: 12 July 1998
- Official name: LI RAC British Grand Prix
- Location: Silverstone Circuit, Silverstone, Northamptonshire and Buckinghamshire, England
- Course: Permanent racing facility
- Course length: 5.140 km (3.194 miles)
- Distance: 60 laps, 308.400 km (191.631 miles)
- Weather: Rain, Wet Track

Pole position
Driver	(Finland) Mika Häkkinen	McLaren-Mercedes
- Time: 1:23.271

Fastest lap
Driver	(Germany) Michael Schumacher	Ferrari
- Time: 1:35.704 on lap 12

Podium
First	(Germany) Michael Schumacher	Ferrari
Second	(Finland) Mika Häkkinen	McLaren-Mercedes
Third	(United Kingdom) Eddie Irvine	Ferrari

The 1998 British Grand Prix (formally the LI RAC British Grand Prix) was a Formula One motor race held at the Silverstone Circuit, England on 12 July 1998. It was the ninth race of the 1998 FIA Formula One World Championship. The 60-lap race was won by Michael Schumacher driving a Ferrari car after starting from second position. Mika Häkkinen, who started from pole position, finished second with Eddie Irvine third in the other Ferrari. Schumacher's victory was his fourth of the season, and his third consecutive victory having won both the preceding Canadian and French Grand Prix, but was under controversial circumstances: there was dispute whether he had avoided a stop-and-go penalty by entering the pit lane to serve it on the final lap, crossing the finish line in the pit lane to win the race before reaching his pit box, although the penalty, which was actually merely a time penalty, was later rescinded.

== Report ==
=== Qualifying ===
Mika Häkkinen took pole position by nearly half a second from championship rival Michael Schumacher. Jacques Villeneuve took third position whilst Häkkinen's team-mate David Coulthard qualified in fourth. Ralf Schumacher and Olivier Panis had their qualifying times deleted as they were not able to get out of their cars quick enough during an FIA safety drill, to practice evacuating the cockpit in case of fire. Ralf Schumacher had spun and stalled his engine early in qualifying and qualified in the spare car, which was set up for his team-mate Damon Hill.

=== Race ===
Heavy rain fell during the morning prior to the race. Although the rain stopped before the start, there was a mixture of wet and dry parts on the circuit and as a result all but two cars started on intermediate compound tyres. The two Stewart-Fords decided to start on dry weather tyres. The first retirement came after 13 laps, when Damon Hill lost control on the damp track whilst battling with Villeneuve for 7th place. After 16 laps, it began to rain again, and many drivers switched to a full wet weather tyre. Johnny Herbert spun and regained the track, but had damaged his car and retired on reaching the pits.

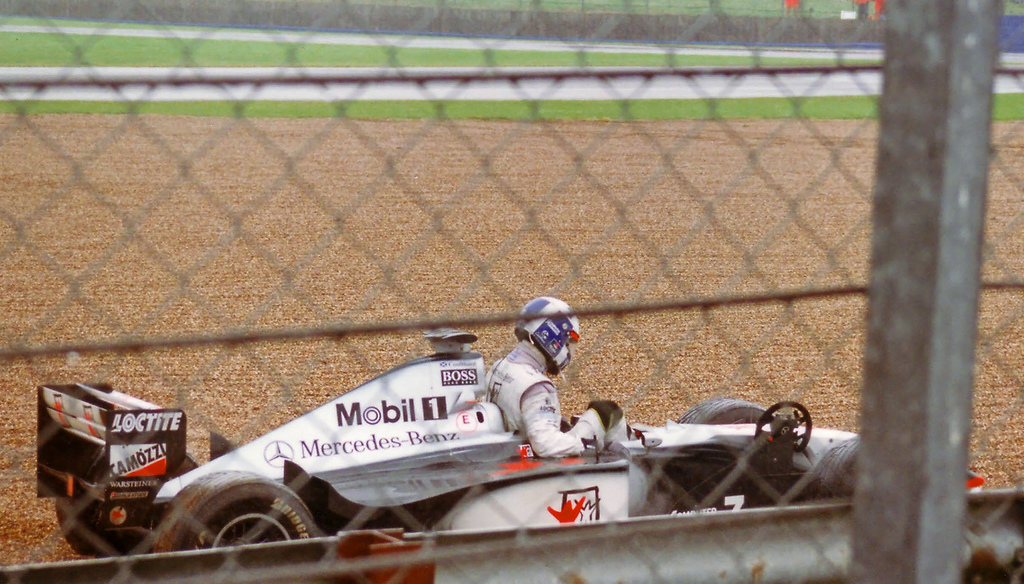
David Coulthard retires from the race

David Coulthard, driving on intermediates, spun out on lap 38 whilst passing a backmarker. Jarno Trulli spun out on the same lap as Coulthard as Barrichello spun out and hit the wall at Club on lap 40. His McLaren-Mercedes team-mate Mika Häkkinen had built up a lead of 49 seconds over second place driver Michael Schumacher when four laps later he went off the track, did a complete 360 degrees turn before continuing. The incident damaged the front wing of his car and cost him 10 seconds of his lead but following numerous other spins caused by the worsening conditions the safety car was deployed which slowed the cars down, and removed Häkkinen's advantage over Schumacher altogether.

The race restarted on lap 50 and it took only two laps for Häkkinen to make another mistake, which put Schumacher in the lead. The German quickly pulled away from his rival, who was now nursing his McLaren home.

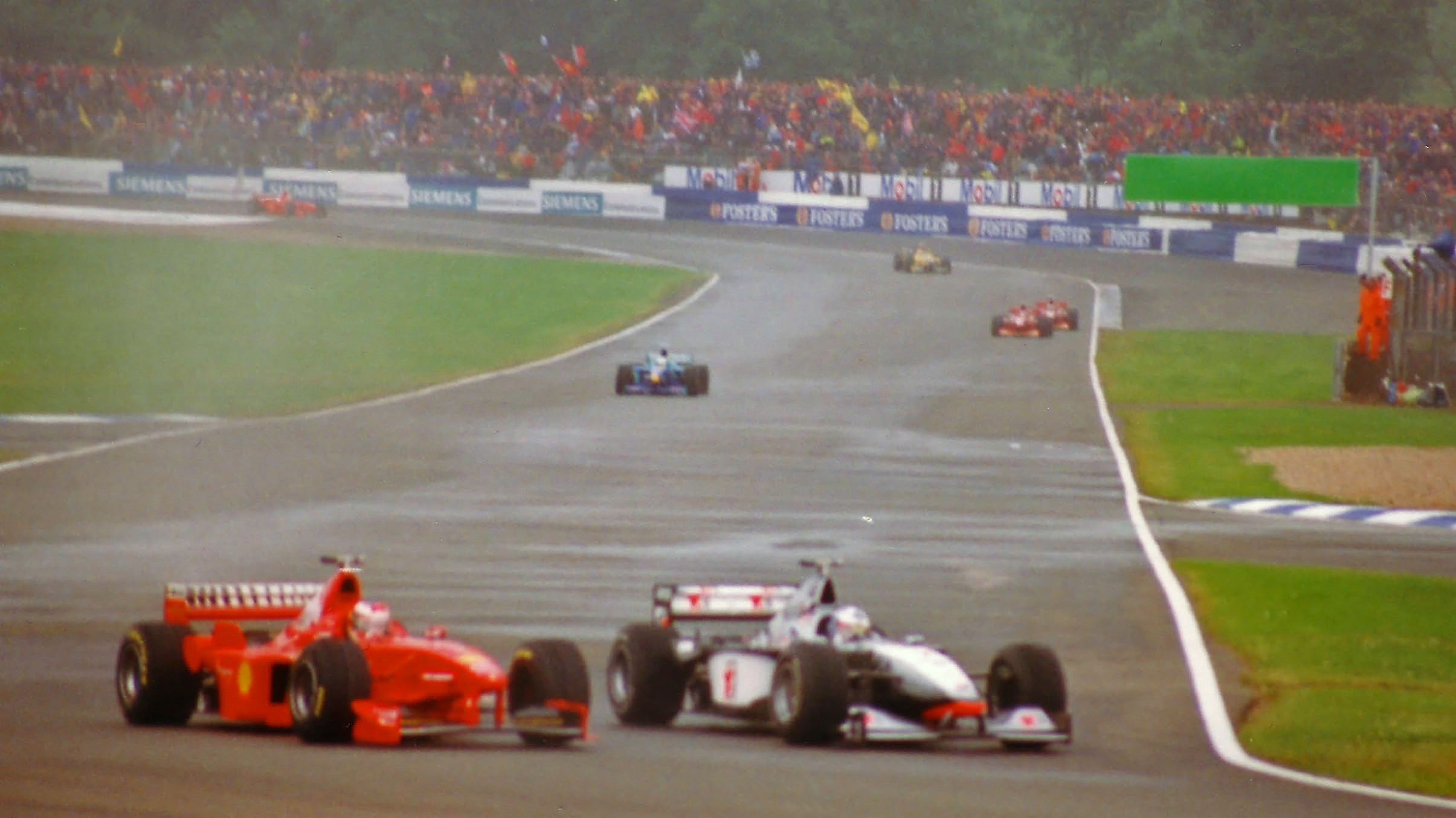
Michael Schumacher and David Coulthard side by side

However, two laps from the finish, Schumacher was issued with a 10-second time penalty for passing Alexander Wurz under the safety car on lap 43. Unsure whether the handwritten notification declared that Schumacher would see 10 seconds being added to his race time or had to serve a 10-second stop-and-go penalty, his team decided to call him into the pits out of precaution to serve a stop-and-go penalty at the end of the last lap of the race. However, in doing so Schumacher crossed the finish line in the pit lane before reaching the Ferrari garage resulting in a dispute on whether he had actually served a stop and go penalty.

=== Post-race ===
Following the race a dispute arose surrounding the circumstances of Michael Schumacher being issued with and serving his penalty. His team argued that the penalty should have been issued within 25 minutes of the incident but instead they were informed after 31 minutes. They also argued that the hand-written notification was unclear as to which penalty was actually being issued: a stop-and-go, or a 10-second addition to Schumacher's race time, though the FIA's International Court of Appeal later clarified that it was the latter. The stewards then decided to nevertheless apply the 10-second addition, post-race. However, the added time penalty can only be used to punish an infraction in the last 12 laps of a Grand Prix, and so did not apply here. The stewards eventually rescinded the penalty altogether.

A protest was lodged by McLaren-Mercedes who felt Ferrari cheated by not having Schumacher serve the penalty, but this was rejected by the FIA. At the hearing for the protest the International Court of Appeal confirmed that the stewards had made several mistakes in issuing a 10-second time penalty for an incident that happened outside of the last 12 laps of a race while exceeding the allowed time limit for the notification of a penalty having been issued. As a result of their mistakes, the three stewards involved handed in their licenses at an extraordinary meeting of the FIA World Council.

== Classification ==
=== Qualifying ===
Pos	No	Driver	Constructor	Lap	Gap
1	8	(Finland) Mika Häkkinen	McLaren-Mercedes	1:23.271	—
2	3	(Germany) Michael Schumacher	Ferrari	1:23.720	+0.449
3	1	(Canada) Jacques Villeneuve	Williams-Mecachrome	1:24.102	+0.831
4	7	(United Kingdom) David Coulthard	McLaren-Mercedes	1:24.310	+1.039
5	4	(United Kingdom) Eddie Irvine	Ferrari	1:24.436	+1.165
6	2	(Germany) Heinz-Harald Frentzen	Williams-Mecachrome	1:24.442	+1.171
7	9	(United Kingdom) Damon Hill	Jordan-Mugen-Honda	1:24.542	+1.271
8	14	(France) Jean Alesi	Sauber-Petronas	1:25.081	+1.810
9	15	(United Kingdom) Johnny Herbert	Sauber-Petronas	1:25.084	+1.813
10	5	(Italy) Giancarlo Fisichella	Benetton-Playlife	1:25.654	+2.383
11	6	(Austria) Alexander Wurz	Benetton-Playlife	1:25.760	+2.489
12	16	(Brazil) Pedro Diniz	Arrows	1:26.376	+3.105
13	17	(Finland) Mika Salo	Arrows	1:26.487	+3.216
14	12	(Italy) Jarno Trulli	Prost-Peugeot	1:26.808	+3.537
15	19	(Netherlands) Jos Verstappen	Stewart-Ford	1:26.948	+3.677
16	18	(Brazil) Rubens Barrichello	Stewart-Ford	1:26.990	+3.719
17	21	(Japan) Toranosuke Takagi	Tyrrell-Ford	1:27.061	+3.790
18	23	(Argentina) Esteban Tuero	Minardi-Ford	1:28.051	+4.780
19	22	(Japan) Shinji Nakano	Minardi-Ford	1:28.123	+4.852
20	20	(Brazil) Ricardo Rosset	Tyrrell-Ford	1:28.608	+5.337
107% time: 1:29.100
21	10	(Germany) Ralf Schumacher	Jordan-Mugen-Honda	No Time^{1}	—
22	11	(France) Olivier Panis	Prost-Peugeot	No Time^{1}	—

Notes

- – Qualification times of Ralf Schumacher and Olivier Panis were disallowed because they failed an FIA safety drill.

=== Race ===
Pos	No	Driver	Constructor	Laps	Time/Retired	Grid	Points
1	3	(Germany) Michael Schumacher	Ferrari	60	1:47:02.450	2	10
2	8	(Finland) Mika Häkkinen	McLaren-Mercedes	60	+22.465	1	6
3	4	(United Kingdom) Eddie Irvine	Ferrari	60	+29.199	5	4
4	6	(Austria) Alexander Wurz	Benetton-Playlife	59	+1 Lap	11	3
5	5	(Italy) Giancarlo Fisichella	Benetton-Playlife	59	+1 Lap	10	2
6	10	(Germany) Ralf Schumacher	Jordan-Mugen-Honda	59	+1 Lap	21	1
7	1	(Canada) Jacques Villeneuve	Williams-Mecachrome	59	+1 Lap	3	
8	22	(Japan) Shinji Nakano	Minardi-Ford	58	+2 Laps	19	
9	21	(Japan) Toranosuke Takagi	Tyrrell-Ford	56	+4 Laps	17	
Ret	14	(France) Jean Alesi	Sauber-Petronas	53	Electrical	8	
Ret	16	(Brazil) Pedro Diniz	Arrows	45	Spun off	12	
Ret	11	(France) Olivier Panis	Prost-Peugeot	40	Spun off	22	
Ret	18	(Brazil) Rubens Barrichello	Stewart-Ford	39	Accident	16	
Ret	19	(Netherlands) Jos Verstappen	Stewart-Ford	38	Engine	15	
Ret	7	(United Kingdom) David Coulthard	McLaren-Mercedes	37	Spun off	4	
Ret	12	(Italy) Jarno Trulli	Prost-Peugeot	37	Spun off	14	
Ret	20	(Brazil) Ricardo Rosset	Tyrrell-Ford	29	Spun off	20	
Ret	23	(Argentina) Esteban Tuero	Minardi-Ford	29	Spun off	18	
Ret	15	(United Kingdom) Johnny Herbert	Sauber-Petronas	27	Spun off	9	
Ret	17	(Finland) Mika Salo	Arrows	27	Throttle	13	
Ret	2	(Germany) Heinz-Harald Frentzen	Williams-Mecachrome	15	Spun off	6	
Ret	9	(United Kingdom) Damon Hill	Jordan-Mugen-Honda	13	Spun off	7	

== Championship standings after the race ==
Drivers' Championship standings

Pos	Driver	Points
1	(Finland) Mika Häkkinen	56
2	(Germany) Michael Schumacher	54
3	(United Kingdom) David Coulthard	30
4	(United Kingdom) Eddie Irvine	29
5	(Austria) Alexander Wurz	17

Constructors' Championship standings

Pos	Constructor	Points
1	(United Kingdom) McLaren-Mercedes	86
2	(Italy) Ferrari	83
3	(Italy) Benetton-Playlife	32
4	(United Kingdom) Williams-Mecachrome	19
5	(United Kingdom) Stewart-Ford	5

- Note: Only the top five positions are included for both sets of standings.

== Footnotes ==
Previous race: 1998 French Grand Prix	FIA Formula One World Championship; 1998 season	Next race: 1998 Austrian Grand Prix
Previous race: 1997 British Grand Prix	British Grand Prix	Next race: 1999 British Grand Prix
