= Esteban Tuero =

Argentine racing driver (born 1978)

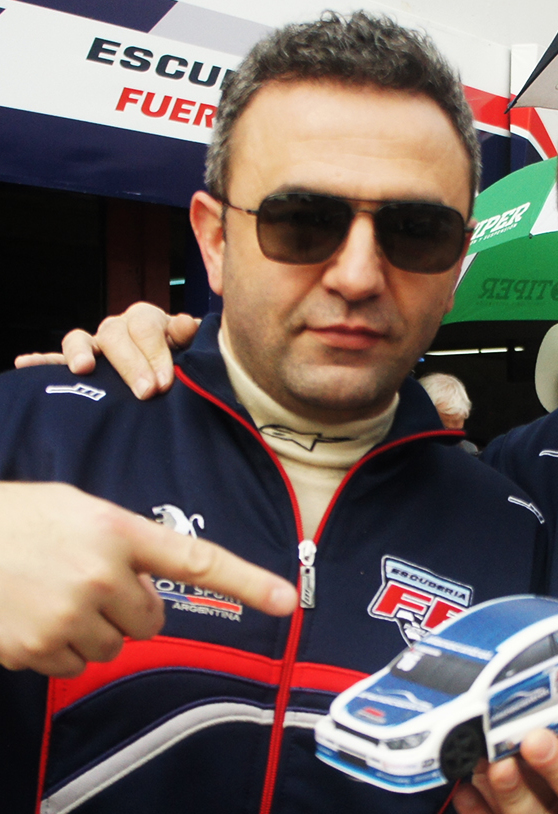
- Tuero in 2017
- Born: Esteban Eduardo Tuero; 22 April 1978 (age 48); Buenos Aires, Argentina

Formula One World Championship career
- Nationality: (Argentina) Argentine
- Active years: 1998
- Team: Minardi
- Entries: 16
- Championships: 0
- Wins: 0
- Podiums: 0
- Career points: 0
- Pole positions: 0
- Fastest laps: 0
- First entry: 1998 Australian Grand Prix
- Last entry: 1998 Japanese Grand Prix

Esteban Eduardo Tuero (born 22 April 1978) is an Argentine former racing driver who raced in Formula One for the Minardi team in 1998. At the age of 19, he became the then-third-youngest (now 11th-youngest) Formula One driver in history when he landed his seat alongside Shinji Nakano, but left the championship at the end of the season.

== Early life ==
Esteban Eduardo Tuero was born at a time when the likes of Nelson Piquet and Alain Prost were just beginning their careers. The Argentine Grand Prix was based near to his home, at the Oscar Gálvez race circuit. This meant that Formula One was popular where he grew up and, though the Grand Prix was discontinued in 1982, the sport was one of the biggest in the country.

Tuero was born to a family who had a huge interest in motor racing, his father being a minor race car driver, and so Esteban was groomed for the big time from an early age by beginning karts at the age of seven. He would drive karts until 1992, moving up to the Formula series the following year.

== Junior formulae career ==
Tuero moved up to car racing in 1993, spending a season with the Crespi team in Formula Renault. In 1994, he switched to Formula Honda with the Kissling team, becoming champion. All of his career so far had been in his native Argentina, so despite the pressures of racing in a Formula series whilst only 14, he was given his first taste of traveling the continent with a few races in South American Formula Three, driving a Ralt/Opel with the INI team.

In 1995, Tuero moved to Europe, his father knowing his career would need to go there in order to gain momentum. He won the Italian Formula 2000 National Trophy by a large margin in a Dallara 392, and was also given a taste of Italian Formula Three in a Dallara 395. In 1996, he joined the bigger Italian F3 team Coloni Motorsport, driving a Dallara 396 with an Alfa Romeo engine. His performances in the series started generating interest from Formula One teams, with Benetton in the frame for signing him. It would be Minardi, though, who secured his services as a test driver for the team, despite being just 18 years old.

== Route to Formula One ==
In the 1996 Formula Three season, Tuero finished fourth in his first race, and he crossed the line first in his second race, only to be disqualified due to using illegal fuel. In the non-championship Monaco event, he started on the front row alongside future F1 driver Jarno Trulli, battling with him before eventually punting him at the hairpin on Lap 17. Tuero retired due to a flat battery later in the race.

Tuero opted to not finish the season in Formula Three, though, and jumped ship to Formula 3000 halfway through. His finishes in Italian F3 left him 13th in the final championship standings. His run for Draco resulted in only one top ten and a final championship position of 16th. His poor performance for Draco meant he was dropped for 1997, but instead of dropping back to Formula 3, he went to the Formula Nippon series in Japan. He only scored one point and finished 16th in the standings (ending up 81 points down on championship winner Pedro de la Rosa), but Tuero covered the required mileage making him eligible for an F1 Super License. His continuing test role with Minardi impressed the team to the extent that the Italian outfit gave him a race seat for the 1998 season, alongside the Japanese driver Shinji Nakano.

== Formula One career ==
1998

Initially, there were doubts over whether Tuero would be allowed to compete in the 1998 season. Although Minardi had contracted him to drive an M198, alongside Japan's Shinji Nakano, he failed to meet all Super License requirements. Formula One pundit and former driver Martin Brundle said, "As for Tuero, it would have been scary. I don't like to see these guys out there with so little experience. Imagine it: even if he didn't qualify, he'd be getting in the way during qualifying. And if he did qualify, then he'd definitely be lapped plenty. He'd have really needed to have his wits about him. To be honest, it annoys me, people like that, with zilch credibility."

Tuero was eventually awarded his license by the FIA and upon starting the season at 19 years of age, he became the third-youngest ever Formula One driver at the time. Tuero answered his doubters by qualifying an impressive 17th in Australia, ahead of teammate Nakano and the likes of 1996 Monaco Grand Prix winner Olivier Panis. Race day was a more frustrating affair, he jumped the start and received a 10-second penalty. He incurred the same penalty for speeding in the pit lane before retiring with a blown engine. Gearbox problems in Brazil followed by a poor pitstop and spin into the gravel at his home race in Argentina left Tuero with no finishes in the opening three races.

The San Marino Grand Prix was a race of attrition, but Tuero nursed his Minardi home to 8th for his first finish of the year before coming home 15th in Spain, where he served a stop-and-go penalty for speeding in the pit lane. For five races in a row, Tuero then failed to finish; Monaco, where he spun off before a lap was completed, Canada, France, Great Britain, where he was one of many to spin off in awful conditions, and Austria, where he spun off for the second race running.

16th in Germany halted the run of retirements, but only briefly. Tuero lasted 13 laps in Hungary, and, though he was not involved in the multi-car crash at the start of the Belgian Grand Prix, still retired prior to half-distance. 11th in Italy preceded another retirement at the Luxembourg Grand Prix.

Tuero's final race of the season, the Japanese Grand Prix, would also be his final race in a top-level single-seater series. Starting 21st on the grid, he crashed into Toranosuke Takagi on lap 29, after accidentally hitting the throttle rather than the brakes. His Minardi vaulted Takagi's Tyrrell and upon landing he damaged a number of vertebrae in his neck. In the immediate aftermath of the incident, Ferrari's Michael Schumacher who was challenging McLaren's Mika Häkkinen for the Drivers' Championship, passed the accident spot where carbon fibre debris were littering the race track. Schumacher then suffered a catastrophic rear tyre failure forcing him to retire and thus handing Häkkinen his first World Drivers' Championship. Meanwhile, Tuero's sole Formula One season proved fruitless with no points and no ranking in the Drivers' Championship.

1999

The restructured Minardi squad headed toward the 1999 season with plans to run Tuero once more, this time alongside Spaniard Marc Gene. Tuero was due to test the new car, the M01, in late January after recuperating from his injuries, but on the eve of that first test, he announced his retirement from Formula One.

== After Formula One ==
Though Minardi had counted on Tuero staying with the team for the 1999 season, to the surprise of the team he walked into a meeting and said he would leave Formula 1 and move back to his home country. In 1999, he joined the Argentinian TC2000 touring car racing series, where he struggled to make an impact by finishing outside the top ten overall. He later won two races at the wheel of a Volkswagen Polo which was one of the three official Volkswagen cars on the grid. After that, Volkswagen discontinued his official link with the team while they were developing new cars for the series. The new car, a Volkswagen Bora, was far from reliable and Tuero lost potential race wins as a result.

Tuero was linked with a pay-drivers seat in the CART series for 2002, but it never happened. Despite that, he continued racing at TC2000 with several teams and some successful performances.

In 2008, Tuero participated part-time in the FIA GT Championship in a Ferrari 550-GTS Maranello.

Tuero announced his retirement from racing after the 2016 TC2000 season.

== Racing record ==
=== Complete International Formula 3000 results ===
(key) (Races in bold indicate pole position) (Races in italics indicate fastest lap)

Year	Entrant	1	2	3	4	5	6	7	8	9	10	DC	Points
1996	Draco Engineering	NÜR	PAU	PER	HOC	SIL; 14	SPA; 17	MAG; 10	EST; Ret	MUG; 13	HOC; Ret	24th	0

=== Complete Formula Nippon results ===
(key) (Races in bold indicate pole position) (Races in italics indicate fastest lap)

Year	Entrant	1	2	3	4	5	6	7	8	9	10	DC	Points
1997	Team LeMans	SUZ; Ret	MIN; Ret	FUJ; 9	SUZ; 11	SUG; Ret	FUJ; 6	MIN	MOT	FUJ	SUZ	16th	1

=== Complete Formula One Grand Prix results ===
(key)

Year	Entrant	Chassis	Engine	1	2	3	4	5	6	7	8	9	10	11	12	13	14	15	16	WDC	Points
1998	Minardi	Minardi M198	Ford V10	AUS; Ret	BRA; Ret	ARG; Ret	SMR; 8	ESP; 15	MON; Ret	CAN; Ret	FRA; Ret	GBR; Ret	AUT; Ret	GER; 16	HUN; Ret	BEL; Ret	ITA; 11	LUX; Ret	JPN; Ret	NC	0

== Sources ==
- Esteban Tuero career summary at DriverDB.com
- Profile at www.grandprix.com
- Esteban Tuero at IMDb
