= Playlife =

Italian sportswear brand

- Playlife logo
- Industry: Fashion
- Predecessor: Benetton Sportsystem
- Defunct: 2013
- Headquarters: Treviso, Italy
- Key people: Alessandro Benetton (CEO); Giovanni Peracin (Business Director)
- Owner: Benetton family
- Parent: Benetton Group

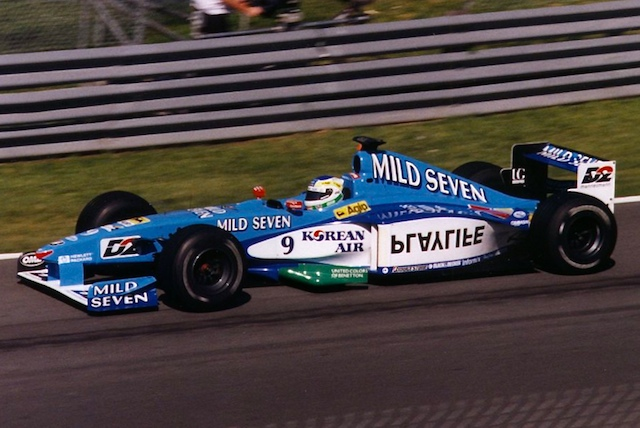
Playlife branding on the 1999 Benetton B199

Playlife (stylised in reverse mirrored words) was a fashion company based in Treviso, Italy. It was a wholly owned subsidiary of the Benetton Group.

== History ==
In July 1997, Benetton Group acquired a 57% stake in Benetton Sportsystem from Edizione Holdings for 318bn lire. At this time, it was rebranded to Playlife to represent sports equipment, goods and fashion for the company with brands such as Prince, Rollerblade and Kästle. In mid 1998, Benetton predicted around 40 Playlife specific stores would open in Europe. By 1999, the entire former Benetton Sportsystem brand was consolidated into the group under Playlife.

Playlife produced the tracksuits and casual shoes used by the Italian Olympic Team at the 2000 Olympic Games in Sydney. The team also opened the first dedicated Playlife store in Milan. Store expansion continued and by 2011, Giovanni Peracin was announced as the new Playlife Business Director. At the same time, Benetton opened a new Playlife concept store in the headquarters city of Treviso. By late 2013, Playlife was axed by the Benetton Group during a restructuring.

== Formula One ==
Between 1998 and 2000, the Benetton Formula One team utilised first Mecachrome and then Supertec engines that were rebranded to Playlife, and the cars featured sponsorship from the company.

=== Complete Formula One World Championship results ===
(key) (results in bold indicate pole position) (Races in italics indicate fastest lap)

Year	Entrant	Chassis	Engine	Tyres	Drivers	1	2	3	4	5	6	7	8	9	10	11	12	13	14	15	16	17	Points	WCC
1998	Mild Seven Benetton	Benetton B198	Playlife (Mecachrome) GC37-01 3.0 V10	B		AUS	BRA	ARG	SMR	ESP	MON	CAN	FRA	GBR	AUT	GER	HUN	BEL	ITA	LUX	JPN		33	5th
1998	Mild Seven Benetton	Benetton B198	Playlife (Mecachrome) GC37-01 3.0 V10	B	(Italy) Giancarlo Fisichella	Ret	6	7	Ret	Ret	2	2	9	5	**Ret**	7	8	Ret	8	6	8		33	5th
1998	Mild Seven Benetton	Benetton B198	Playlife (Mecachrome) GC37-01 3.0 V10	B	(Austria) Alexander Wurz	7	4	4	Ret	4	Ret	4	5	4	9	11	16^{†}	Ret	Ret	7	9		33	5th
1999	Mild Seven Benetton	Benetton B199	Playlife (Supertec) FB01 3.0 V10	B		AUS	BRA	SMR	MON	ESP	CAN	FRA	GBR	AUT	GER	HUN	BEL	ITA	EUR	MAL	JPN		16	6th
1999	Mild Seven Benetton	Benetton B199	Playlife (Supertec) FB01 3.0 V10	B	(Italy) Giancarlo Fisichella	4	Ret	5	5	9	2	Ret	7	12^{†}	Ret	Ret	11	Ret	Ret	11	14^{†}		16	6th
1999	Mild Seven Benetton	Benetton B199	Playlife (Supertec) FB01 3.0 V10	B	(Austria) Alexander Wurz	Ret	7	Ret	6	10	Ret	Ret	10	5	7	7	14	Ret	Ret	8	10		16	6th
2000	Mild Seven Benetton	Benetton B200	Playlife (Supertec) FB02 3.0 V10	B		AUS	BRA	SMR	GBR	ESP	EUR	MON	CAN	FRA	AUT	GER	HUN	BEL	ITA	USA	JPN	MAL	20	4th
2000	Mild Seven Benetton	Benetton B200	Playlife (Supertec) FB02 3.0 V10	B	(Italy) Giancarlo Fisichella	5	2	11	7	9	5	3	3	9	Ret	Ret	Ret	Ret	11	Ret	14	9	20	4th
2000	Mild Seven Benetton	Benetton B200	Playlife (Supertec) FB02 3.0 V10	B	(Austria) Alexander Wurz	7	Ret	9	9	10	12^{†}	Ret	9	Ret	10	Ret	11	13	5	10	Ret	7	20	4th
