= 1999 Brazilian Grand Prix =

Race 2 of 16 in the 1999 Formula One World Championship
← Previous race	Next race →

Race details
- Date: 11 April 1999
- Official name: XXVIII Grande Prêmio Marlboro do Brasil
- Location: Autódromo José Carlos Pace; Interlagos, São Paulo, Brazil
- Course: Permanent racing facility
- Course length: 4.309 km (2.667 miles)
- Distance: 72 laps, 310.248 km (192.024 miles)
- Weather: Sunny, hot, dry 25 °C (77 °F)
- Attendance: 80,000

Pole position
Driver	(Finland) Mika Häkkinen	McLaren-Mercedes
- Time: 1:16.568

Fastest lap
Driver	(Finland) Mika Häkkinen	McLaren-Mercedes
- Time: 1:18.448 on lap 70

Podium
First	(Finland) Mika Häkkinen	McLaren-Mercedes
Second	(Germany) Michael Schumacher	Ferrari
Third	(Germany) Heinz-Harald Frentzen	Jordan-Mugen-Honda

The 1999 Brazilian Grand Prix (formally the XXVIII Grande Prêmio Marlboro do Brasil) was a Formula One motor race held on 11 April 1999 at the Autódromo José Carlos Pace in São Paulo, Brazil. It was the second race of the 1999 Formula One season. The 71-lap race was won by McLaren driver Mika Häkkinen after starting from pole position. Michael Schumacher finished second in a Ferrari with Heinz-Harald Frentzen third for the Jordan team.

Ricardo Zonta did not qualify for the race, after he had injured his left foot in a big crash during Saturday's practice.

== Report ==
=== Background ===
==== Driver changes ====
The race marked the debut for Stéphane Sarrazin, who drove the Minardi for an injured Luca Badoer. Badoer had injured his hand in a testing accident, and Sarrazin - then the test driver for Prost - was drafted in to Minardi.

As Luca Badoer returned for the following race, and he was still the test driver for Prost, it was Stéphane Sarrazin's only entry in Formula One.

=== Race ===
At the start of the race, pole sitter Mika Häkkinen raced off with the lead, while his McLaren teammate David Coulthard stalled on the grid. McLaren at this point had been reeling from a double-DNF at the season-opening Australian Grand Prix, and Coulthard's failure raised eyebrows at the team. Coulthard's car was pushed into the pit lane, where it was restarted as the leaders began lap 4.

On lap 4, local hero Rubens Barrichello took the lead of the race from Mika Häkkinen after Häkkinen's car suffered a temporary transmission malfunction and was unable to select any gears. Häkkinen was also passed by Michael Schumacher before his car regained the ability to select gears. Barrichello was able to stay in front until he pitted on lap 27. It was the first time a Stewart car had led a race. The crowd of roughly 80,000 cheered wildly as "Rubinho" built a lead of about 5 seconds over Schumacher.

Alexander Wurz and Damon Hill collided on lap 10, ending Hill's race. Rubens Barrichello fell to fourth place after his pit stop, and Michael Schumacher took over the lead. David Coulthard's day ended when he pulled off the track with a mechanical failure. Stéphane Sarrazin, in his only F1 entry, had a massive crash on the pit straight on lap 31 after suffering a wing failure, with him spinning more than six times. On lap 35, Barrichello passed Eddie Irvine under braking into the first corner to take third place.

Michael Schumacher came in for a pit stop on lap 38, allowing Mika Häkkinen past. Häkkinen had been held up by Schumacher, so he began trying to build up enough of a gap so he could come out ahead of Schumacher after his own pit stop. Lapped traffic delayed his progress at first, but after one lap he was able to turn in a couple of fast laps. He pitted on lap 42, and his fast laps combined with quick work by his pit crew allowed him to easily retain the lead over Schumacher.

On lap 42, Pedro Diniz spun off and beached his car after trying to pass another car to the inside. Rubens Barrichello's race ended on the same lap with a blown engine. Eddie Irvine came in for an unscheduled pit stop on lap 55 to clear the radiators of his overheating Ferrari, dropping him back to fifth.

Mika Häkkinen won the race, with Michael Schumacher second. Heinz-Harald Frentzen was classified third despite running out of fuel on the final lap, as the next car was a lap down. Ralf Schumacher finished fourth after being closely pursued by Eddie Irvine for the last few laps. 10th race win for Mika Häkkinen.

== Classification ==
=== Qualifying ===
Pos	No	Driver	Constructor	Time	Gap	Grid
1	1	(Finland) Mika Häkkinen	McLaren-Mercedes	1:16.568	—	1
2	2	(United Kingdom) David Coulthard	McLaren-Mercedes	1:16.715	+0.147	2
3	16	(Brazil) Rubens Barrichello	Stewart-Ford	1:17.305	+0.737	3
4	3	(Germany) Michael Schumacher	Ferrari	1:17.578	+1.010	4
5	9	(Italy) Giancarlo Fisichella	Benetton-Playlife	1:17.810	+1.242	5
6	4	(United Kingdom) Eddie Irvine	Ferrari	1:17.843	+1.275	6
7	7	(United Kingdom) Damon Hill	Jordan-Mugen-Honda	1:17.884	+1.316	7
8	8	(Germany) Heinz-Harald Frentzen	Jordan-Mugen-Honda	1:17.902	+1.334	8
9	10	(Austria) Alexander Wurz	Benetton-Playlife	1:18.334	+1.766	9
10	17	(United Kingdom) Johnny Herbert	Stewart-Ford	1:18.374	+1.806	10
11	6	(Germany) Ralf Schumacher	Williams-Supertec	1:18.506	+1.938	11
12	18	(France) Olivier Panis	Prost-Peugeot	1:18.636	+2.068	12
13	19	(Italy) Jarno Trulli	Prost-Peugeot	1:18.684	+2.116	13
14	11	(France) Jean Alesi	Sauber-Petronas	1:18.716	+2.148	14
15	12	(Brazil) Pedro Diniz	Sauber-Petronas	1:19.194	+2.626	15
16	22	(Canada) Jacques Villeneuve	BAR-Supertec	1:19.377	+2.809	21^{1}
17	5	(Italy) Alessandro Zanardi	Williams-Supertec	1:19.452	+2.884	16
18	20	(France) Stéphane Sarrazin	Minardi-Ford	1:20.016	+3.448	17
19	14	(Spain) Pedro de la Rosa	Arrows	1:20.075	+3.507	18
20	15	(Japan) Toranosuke Takagi	Arrows	1:20.096	+3.528	19
21	21	(Spain) Marc Gené	Minardi-Ford	1:20.710	+4.142	20
107% time: 1:21.928
DNQ	23	(Brazil) Ricardo Zonta	BAR-Supertec	—	—	—
Sources:

1. Qualified 16th, stripped of time due to illegal fuel.

=== Race ===
Pos	No	Driver	Constructor	Laps	Time/Retired	Grid	Points
1	1	(Finland) Mika Häkkinen	McLaren-Mercedes	72	1:36:03.785	1	10
2	3	(Germany) Michael Schumacher	Ferrari	72	+4.925	4	6
3	8	(Germany) Heinz-Harald Frentzen	Jordan-Mugen-Honda	71	Out of fuel	8	4
4	6	(Germany) Ralf Schumacher	Williams-Supertec	71	+1 Lap	11	3
5	4	(United Kingdom) Eddie Irvine	Ferrari	71	+1 Lap	6	2
6	18	(France) Olivier Panis	Prost-Peugeot	71	+1 Lap	12	1
7	10	(Austria) Alexander Wurz	Benetton-Playlife	70	+2 Laps	9	
8	15	(Japan) Toranosuke Takagi	Arrows	69	+3 Laps	19	
9	21	(Spain) Marc Gené	Minardi-Ford	69	+3 Laps	20	
Ret	14	(Spain) Pedro de la Rosa	Arrows	52	Hydraulics	17	
Ret	22	(Canada) Jacques Villeneuve	BAR-Supertec	49	Hydraulics	21	
Ret	5	(Italy) Alessandro Zanardi	Williams-Supertec	43	Gearbox	16	
Ret	16	(Brazil) Rubens Barrichello	Stewart-Ford	42	Engine	3	
Ret	12	(Brazil) Pedro Diniz	Sauber-Petronas	42	Collision	15	
Ret	9	(Italy) Giancarlo Fisichella	Benetton-Playlife	38	Clutch	5	
Ret	20	(France) Stéphane Sarrazin	Minardi-Ford	31	Throttle/Accident	18	
Ret	11	(France) Jean Alesi	Sauber-Petronas	27	Gearbox	14	
Ret	2	(United Kingdom) David Coulthard	McLaren-Mercedes	22	Gearbox	2	
Ret	19	(Italy) Jarno Trulli	Prost-Peugeot	21	Gearbox	13	
Ret	17	(United Kingdom) Johnny Herbert	Stewart-Ford	15	Hydraulics	10	
Ret	7	(United Kingdom) Damon Hill	Jordan-Mugen-Honda	10	Collision damage	7	
DNQ	23	(Brazil) Ricardo Zonta	BAR-Supertec		Injured in Practice		

== Championship standings after the race ==
Drivers' Championship standings

Pos	Driver	Points
1	(United Kingdom) Eddie Irvine	12
2	(Finland) Mika Häkkinen	10
3	(Germany) Heinz-Harald Frentzen	10
4	(Germany) Ralf Schumacher	7
5	(Germany) Michael Schumacher	6

Constructors' Championship standings

Pos	Constructor	Points
1	(Italy) Ferrari	18
2	(United Kingdom) McLaren-Mercedes	10
3	(Republic of Ireland) Jordan-Mugen-Honda	10
4	(United Kingdom) Williams-Supertec	7
5	(Italy) Benetton-Playlife	3

- Note: Only the top five positions are included for both sets of standings

Previous race: 1999 Australian Grand Prix	FIA Formula One World Championship; 1999 season	Next race: 1999 San Marino Grand Prix
Previous race: 1998 Brazilian Grand Prix	Brazilian Grand Prix	Next race: 2000 Brazilian Grand Prix
