= 1998 Hungarian Grand Prix =

Race 12 of 16 in the 1998 Formula One World Championship
← Previous race	Next race →

Race details
- Date: 16 August 1998
- Official name: XIV Marlboro Magyar Nagydíj
- Location: Hungaroring; Mogyoród, Pest, Hungary
- Course: Permanent racing facility
- Course length: 3.972 km (2.468 miles)
- Distance: 77 laps, 305.844 km (190.042 miles)
- Weather: Cloudy, hot, dry; 30 °C (86 °F)

Pole position
Driver	(Finland) Mika Häkkinen	McLaren-Mercedes
- Time: 1:16.973

Fastest lap
Driver	(Germany) Michael Schumacher	Ferrari
- Time: 1:19.286 on lap 60

Podium
First	(Germany) Michael Schumacher	Ferrari
Second	(United Kingdom) David Coulthard	McLaren-Mercedes
Third	(Canada) Jacques Villeneuve	Williams-Mecachrome

The 1998 Hungarian Grand Prix (formally the XIV Marlboro Magyar Nagydíj) was a Formula One motor race held at the Hungaroring, Mogyoród, Pest, Hungary on 16 August 1998. It was the twelfth race of the 1998 Formula One World Championship.

The 77-lap race was won by German driver Michael Schumacher, driving a Ferrari, after he started from third position. Drivers' Championship leader, Finn Mika Häkkinen, took pole position in his McLaren-Mercedes and led the first 46 laps. Under guidance from Ferrari technical director Ross Brawn, Schumacher opted to take three pit stops rather than the two favoured by the McLarens, and took the lead after his second stop, before extending his advantage such that he could retain it after his third stop. Schumacher went on to win by 9.4 seconds from Briton David Coulthard in the other McLaren-Mercedes, with Canadian Jacques Villeneuve third in a Williams-Mecachrome.

With Häkkinen dropping to sixth after shock absorber problems in the closing stages of the race, Schumacher cut the Finn's championship lead to seven points with four races remaining. In October 1998, the organisers of the race were fined US$1 million, with US$750,000 of it suspended, due to a track invasion. As there was no repeat of this invasion in the following two years, the fine was US$250,000.

== Classification ==
=== Qualifying ===
Pos	No	Driver	Constructor	Time	Gap
1	8	(Finland) Mika Häkkinen	McLaren-Mercedes	1:16.973	
2	7	(United Kingdom) David Coulthard	McLaren-Mercedes	1:17.131	+0.158
3	3	(Germany) Michael Schumacher	Ferrari	1:17.366	+0.393
4	9	(United Kingdom) Damon Hill	Jordan-Mugen-Honda	1:18.214	+1.241
5	4	(United Kingdom) Eddie Irvine	Ferrari	1:18.325	+1.352
6	1	(Canada) Jacques Villeneuve	Williams-Mecachrome	1:18.337	+1.364
7	2	(Germany) Heinz-Harald Frentzen	Williams-Mecachrome	1:19.029	+2.056
8	5	(Italy) Giancarlo Fisichella	Benetton-Playlife	1:19.050	+2.077
9	6	(Austria) Alexander Wurz	Benetton-Playlife	1:19.063	+2.090
10	10	(Germany) Ralf Schumacher	Jordan-Mugen-Honda	1:19.171	+2.198
11	14	(France) Jean Alesi	Sauber-Petronas	1:19.210	+2.237
12	16	(Brazil) Pedro Diniz	Arrows	1:19.706	+2.733
13	17	(Finland) Mika Salo	Arrows	1:19.712	+2.739
14	18	(Brazil) Rubens Barrichello	Stewart-Ford	1:19.876	+2.903
15	15	(United Kingdom) Johnny Herbert	Sauber-Petronas	1:19.878	+2.905
16	12	(Italy) Jarno Trulli	Prost-Peugeot	1:20.042	+3.069
17	19	(Netherlands) Jos Verstappen	Stewart-Ford	1:20.198	+3.225
18	21	(Japan) Toranosuke Takagi	Tyrrell-Ford	1:20.354	+3.381
19	22	(Japan) Shinji Nakano	Minardi-Ford	1:20.635	+3.662
20	11	(France) Olivier Panis	Prost-Peugeot	1:20.663	+3.690
21	23	(Argentina) Esteban Tuero	Minardi-Ford	1:21.725	+4.752
107% time: 1:22.361
DNQ	20	(Brazil) Ricardo Rosset	Tyrrell-Ford	1:23.140	+6.167

=== Race ===
Pos	No	Driver	Constructor	Laps	Time/Retired	Grid	Points
1	3	(Germany) Michael Schumacher	Ferrari	77	1:45:25.550	3	10
2	7	(United Kingdom) David Coulthard	McLaren-Mercedes	77	+ 9.433	2	6
3	1	(Canada) Jacques Villeneuve	Williams-Mecachrome	77	+ 44.444	6	4
4	9	(United Kingdom) Damon Hill	Jordan-Mugen-Honda	77	+ 55.076	4	3
5	2	(Germany) Heinz-Harald Frentzen	Williams-Mecachrome	77	+ 56.510	7	2
6	8	(Finland) Mika Häkkinen	McLaren-Mercedes	76	+ 1 lap	1	1
7	14	(France) Jean Alesi	Sauber-Petronas	76	+ 1 lap	11	
8	5	(Italy) Giancarlo Fisichella	Benetton-Playlife	76	+ 1 lap	8	
9	10	(Germany) Ralf Schumacher	Jordan-Mugen-Honda	76	+ 1 lap	10	
10	15	(United Kingdom) Johnny Herbert	Sauber-Petronas	76	+ 1 lap	15	
11	16	(Brazil) Pedro Diniz	Arrows	74	+ 3 laps	12	
12	11	(France) Olivier Panis	Prost-Peugeot	74	+ 3 laps	20	
13	19	(Netherlands) Jos Verstappen	Stewart-Ford	74	+ 3 laps	17	
14	21	(Japan) Toranosuke Takagi	Tyrrell-Ford	74	+ 3 laps	18	
15	22	(Japan) Shinji Nakano	Minardi-Ford	74	+ 3 laps	19	
16	6	(Austria) Alexander Wurz	Benetton-Playlife	69	Gearbox	9	
Ret	18	(Brazil) Rubens Barrichello	Stewart-Ford	54	Gearbox	14	
Ret	12	(Italy) Jarno Trulli	Prost-Peugeot	28	Engine	16	
Ret	17	(Finland) Mika Salo	Arrows	18	Gearbox	13	
Ret	4	(United Kingdom) Eddie Irvine	Ferrari	13	Gearbox	5	
Ret	23	(Argentina) Esteban Tuero	Minardi-Ford	13	Engine	21	

== Championship standings after the race ==
Drivers' Championship standings

Pos	Driver	Points
1	(Finland) Mika Häkkinen	77
2	(Germany) Michael Schumacher	70
3	(United Kingdom) David Coulthard	48
4	(United Kingdom) Eddie Irvine	32
5	(Canada) Jacques Villeneuve	20

Constructors' Championship standings

Pos	Constructor	Points
1	(United Kingdom) McLaren-Mercedes	125
2	(Italy) Ferrari	102
3	(Italy) Benetton-Playlife	32
4	(United Kingdom) Williams-Mecachrome	30
5	(Republic of Ireland) Jordan-Mugen-Honda	10

- Note: Only the top five positions are included for both sets of standings.

Previous race: 1998 German Grand Prix	FIA Formula One World Championship; 1998 season	Next race: 1998 Belgian Grand Prix
Previous race: 1997 Hungarian Grand Prix	Hungarian Grand Prix	Next race: 1999 Hungarian Grand Prix
