= 1998 Austrian Grand Prix =

Formula One motor race held in 1998

Race 10 of 16 in the 1998 Formula One World Championship
← Previous race	Next race →

Race details
- Date: 26 July 1998
- Official name: XXVII Grosser Preis von Österreich
- Location: A1-Ring, Spielberg, Styria, Austria
- Course: Permanent racing facility
- Course length: 4.319 km (2.684 miles)
- Distance: 71 laps, 307.146 km (190.564 miles)
- Weather: Sunny

Pole position
Driver	(Italy) Giancarlo Fisichella	Benetton-Playlife
- Time: 1:29.598

Fastest lap
Driver	(United Kingdom) David Coulthard	McLaren-Mercedes
- Time: 1:12.878 on lap 30

Podium
First	(Finland) Mika Häkkinen	McLaren-Mercedes
Second	(United Kingdom) David Coulthard	McLaren-Mercedes
Third	(Germany) Michael Schumacher	Ferrari

The 1998 Austrian Grand Prix was a Formula One motor race held at the A1-Ring on 26 July 1998. It was the tenth round of the 1998 FIA Formula One World Championship. A wet-dry qualifying session resulted in a mixed-up grid order, with Giancarlo Fisichella taking the first pole position of his career. The 71-lap race was won by Mika Häkkinen for McLaren, with teammate David Coulthard recovering to finish second, having been involved in two collisions during the race, and Michael Schumacher finishing third for Ferrari.

== Report ==
=== Qualifying ===
The qualifying session led to an unusual grid due to wet conditions, which dried out towards the end, with Fisichella taking his first ever pole and Jean Alesi alongside him in the Sauber.

=== Race ===
Häkkinen started well to lead into the first corner but several cars collided at the first corner behind them, with Toranosuke Takagi's car ending up stranded. Olivier Panis was left immobile on the line with clutch failure. At the second corner, there was another accident, with both Arrows drivers colliding, hitting Coulthard in the process and knocking off his wing after he had qualified in 14th. Coulthard entered the pit lane for a new nose as a safety car was deployed to allow the debris from the collisions to be cleaned up, and he was able to catch up to the back of the field.

At the restart, Häkkinen led away again with Schumacher close behind him. Schumacher attempted to pass Häkkinen but ran wide, allowing Fisichella in the Benetton past him and almost Rubens Barrichello in the Stewart as well. Barrichello soon dropped out with brake problems, while Schumacher overtook Fisichella again. Schumacher was already on a disadvantage with a two-stop strategy and Häkkinen on just one; his situation got worse when he ran very wide, bouncing violently through the gravel trap and ripping off his front wing. He was able to reach the pits and fit a new wing but rejoined almost a lap behind. Around the same time, Heinz-Harald Frentzen in the Williams experienced an engine failure, which caught fire; he was able to escape from the car unharmed.

Twenty-one laps in, Fisichella and Alesi clashed at the second corner, with both having to retire. Coulthard and Schumacher were both quickly moving back up through the field; he had a lot of trouble passing his brother Ralf Schumacher in the Jordan Grand Prix, finally succeeding after several laps. Schumacher then started to catch up to teammate Eddie Irvine, who was slowing; although Irvine said after it was due to marginal brakes, some suggested he was given a team order and asked to move over for his team leader. In the end, Häkkinen took an easy victory. His teammate Coulthard finished second after being last at the start, and Schumacher took third aided by Irvine.

== Classification ==
=== Qualifying ===
Pos	No	Driver	Constructor	Lap	Gap
1	5	(Italy) Giancarlo Fisichella	Benetton-Playlife	1:29.598	—
2	14	(France) Jean Alesi	Sauber-Petronas	1:30.317	+0.719
3	8	(Finland) Mika Häkkinen	McLaren-Mercedes	1:30.517	+0.919
4	3	(Germany) Michael Schumacher	Ferrari	1:30.551	+0.953
5	18	(Brazil) Rubens Barrichello	Stewart-Ford	1:31.005	+1.407
6	17	(Finland) Mika Salo	Arrows	1:31.028	+1.430
7	2	(Germany) Heinz-Harald Frentzen	Williams-Mecachrome	1:31.515	+1.917
8	4	(United Kingdom) Eddie Irvine	Ferrari	1:31.651	+2.053
9	10	(Germany) Ralf Schumacher	Jordan-Mugen-Honda	1:31.917	+2.319
10	11	(France) Olivier Panis	Prost-Peugeot	1:32.081	+2.483
11	1	(Canada) Jacques Villeneuve	Williams-Mecachrome	1:32.083	+2.485
12	19	(Netherlands) Jos Verstappen	Stewart-Ford	1:32.099	+2.501
13	16	(Brazil) Pedro Diniz	Arrows	1:32.206	+2.608
14	7	(United Kingdom) David Coulthard	McLaren-Mercedes	1:32.399	+2.801
15	9	(United Kingdom) Damon Hill	Jordan-Mugen-Honda	1:32.718	+3.120
16	12	(Italy) Jarno Trulli	Prost-Peugeot	1:32.906	+3.308
17	6	(Austria) Alexander Wurz	Benetton-Playlife	1:33.185	+3.587
18	15	(United Kingdom) Johnny Herbert	Sauber-Petronas	1:33.205	+3.607
19	23	(Argentina) Esteban Tuero	Minardi-Ford	1:33.399	+3.801
20	21	(Japan) Toranosuke Takagi	Tyrrell-Ford	1:34.090	+4.492
21	22	(Japan) Shinji Nakano	Minardi-Ford	1:34.536	+4.938
22	20	(Brazil) Ricardo Rosset	Tyrrell-Ford	1:34.910	+5.312
107% time: 1:35.870

- This was the last pole position of Benetton in Formula One.

=== Race ===
Pos	No	Driver	Constructor	Laps	Time/Retired	Grid	Points
1	8	(Finland) Mika Häkkinen	McLaren-Mercedes	71	1:30:44.086	3	10
2	7	(United Kingdom) David Coulthard	McLaren-Mercedes	71	+5.289	14	6
3	3	(Germany) Michael Schumacher	Ferrari	71	+39.092	4	4
4	4	(United Kingdom) Eddie Irvine	Ferrari	71	+43.976	8	3
5	10	(Germany) Ralf Schumacher	Jordan-Mugen-Honda	71	+50.654	9	2
6	1	(Canada) Jacques Villeneuve	Williams-Mecachrome	71	+53.202	11	1
7	9	(United Kingdom) Damon Hill	Jordan-Mugen-Honda	71	+1:13.624	15	
8	15	(United Kingdom) Johnny Herbert	Sauber-Petronas	70	+1 lap	18	
9	6	(Austria) Alexander Wurz	Benetton-Playlife	70	+1 lap	17	
10	12	(Italy) Jarno Trulli	Prost-Peugeot	70	+1 lap	16	
11	22	(Japan) Shinji Nakano	Minardi-Ford	70	+1 lap	21	
12	20	(Brazil) Ricardo Rosset	Tyrrell-Ford	69	+2 laps	22	
Ret	19	(Netherlands) Jos Verstappen	Stewart-Ford	51	Engine	12	
Ret	23	(Argentina) Esteban Tuero	Minardi-Ford	30	Spun off	19	
Ret	5	(Italy) Giancarlo Fisichella	Benetton-Playlife	21	Collision	1	
Ret	14	(France) Jean Alesi	Sauber-Petronas	21	Collision	2	
Ret	2	(Germany) Heinz-Harald Frentzen	Williams-Mecachrome	16	Engine	7	
Ret	18	(Brazil) Rubens Barrichello	Stewart-Ford	8	Brakes	5	
Ret	16	(Brazil) Pedro Diniz	Arrows	3	Collision	13	
Ret	17	(Finland) Mika Salo	Arrows	1	Collision	6	
Ret	11	(France) Olivier Panis	Prost-Peugeot	0	Clutch	10	
Ret	21	(Japan) Toranosuke Takagi	Tyrrell-Ford	0	Collision	20	

== Championship standings after the race ==
- **Bold text** indicates who still has a theoretical chance of becoming World Champion.

Drivers' Championship standings

Pos	Driver	Points
1	(Finland) **Mika Häkkinen**	66
2	(Germany) **Michael Schumacher**	58
3	(United Kingdom) **David Coulthard**	36
4	(United Kingdom) **Eddie Irvine**	32
5	(Austria) **Alexander Wurz**	17

Constructors' Championship standings

Pos	Constructor	Points
1	(United Kingdom) **McLaren-Mercedes**	102
2	(Italy) **Ferrari**	90
3	(Italy) **Benetton-Playlife**	32
4	(United Kingdom) **Williams-Mecachrome**	20
5	(United Kingdom) Stewart-Ford	5

- Note: Only the top five positions are included for both sets of standings.

Previous race: 1998 British Grand Prix	FIA Formula One World Championship; 1998 season	Next race: 1998 German Grand Prix
Previous race: 1997 Austrian Grand Prix	Austrian Grand Prix	Next race: 1999 Austrian Grand Prix
