= 1998 Luxembourg Grand Prix =

Formula One motor race held in 1998

Race 15 of 16 in the 1998 Formula One World Championship
← Previous race	Next race →
- The Nürburgring in its 1998 configuration

Race details
- Date: 27 September 1998
- Official name: Grosser Warsteiner Preis von Luxemburg 1998
- Location: Nürburg, Germany
- Course: Permanent racing facility
- Course length: 4.556 km (2.831 miles)
- Distance: 67 laps, 305.235 km (189.664 miles)
- Weather: Cloudy, cold, dry

Pole position
Driver	(Germany) Michael Schumacher	Ferrari
- Time: 1:18.561

Fastest lap
Driver	(Finland) Mika Häkkinen	McLaren-Mercedes
- Time: 1:20.450 on lap 25

Podium
First	(Finland) Mika Häkkinen	McLaren-Mercedes
Second	(Germany) Michael Schumacher	Ferrari
Third	(United Kingdom) David Coulthard	McLaren-Mercedes

The 1998 Luxembourg Grand Prix (formally the Grosser Warsteiner Preis von Luxemburg 1998) was a Formula One motor race held at the Nürburgring, Nürburg, Germany on 27 September 1998. It was the fifteenth and penultimate race of the 1998 FIA Formula One World Championship. The 67-lap race was won by Mika Häkkinen driving for the McLaren team. Michael Schumacher finished second driving a Ferrari car, with David Coulthard third in the other McLaren.

== Report ==
With two races remaining of the season, McLaren's Mika Häkkinen and Ferrari's Michael Schumacher were battling for the drivers title; they were level on 80 points with Häkkinen ahead on countback. However the momentum was with Schumacher who had won the previous race at Monza, whereas Häkkinen had not won a race since the German Grand Prix four races earlier.

Ferrari locked out the front row with Schumacher on pole ahead of Eddie Irvine. Häkkinen qualified third. At the start Irvine passed Schumacher to take the lead, however he allowed his team leader past at the end of the first lap and then proceeded to hold up Häkkinen. The Finn passed the Ulsterman at the Veedol Chicane on lap 14 and began to close on Schumacher. The German pitted on lap 24, while Häkkinen stayed out until lap 28, emerging from his stop ahead of Schumacher albeit by less than a second. Häkkinen resisted pressure from Schumacher during the second stint and narrowly held on to his lead during the second round of pit stops. In the final stint Häkkinen pulled away from Schumacher, extending his lead to five seconds before easing off in the closing laps to take victory by 2.2 seconds from Schumacher, with the other McLaren of David Coulthard completing the podium having leapfrogged Irvine during the first round of pitstops. The win gave Häkkinen a four-point lead in the championship heading into the final race in Suzuka, meaning he would only need second place there to clinch his first title.

== Classification ==
=== Qualifying ===
Pos.	No.	Driver	Constructor	Time	Gap
1	3	(Germany) Michael Schumacher	Ferrari	1:18.561	—
2	4	(United Kingdom) Eddie Irvine	Ferrari	1:18.907	+0.346
3	8	(Finland) Mika Häkkinen	McLaren-Mercedes	1:18.940	+0.379
4	5	(Italy) Giancarlo Fisichella	Benetton-Playlife	1:19.048	+0.487
5	7	(United Kingdom) David Coulthard	McLaren-Mercedes	1:19.169	+0.608
6	10	(Germany) Ralf Schumacher	Jordan-Mugen-Honda	1:19.455	+0.894
7	2	(Germany) Heinz-Harald Frentzen	Williams-Mecachrome	1:19.522	+0.961
8	6	(Austria) Alexander Wurz	Benetton-Playlife	1:19.569	+1.008
9	1	(Canada) Jacques Villeneuve	Williams-Mecachrome	1:19.631	+1.070
10	9	(United Kingdom) Damon Hill	Jordan-Mugen-Honda	1:19.807	+1.246
11	14	(France) Jean Alesi	Sauber-Petronas	1:20.493	+1.932
12	18	(Brazil) Rubens Barrichello	Stewart-Ford	1:20.530	+1.969
13	15	(United Kingdom) Johnny Herbert	Sauber-Petronas	1:20.650	+2.089
14	12	(Italy) Jarno Trulli	Prost-Peugeot	1:20.709	+2.148
15	11	(France) Olivier Panis	Prost-Peugeot	1:21.048	+2.487
16	17	(Finland) Mika Salo	Arrows	1:21.120	+2.559
17	16	(Brazil) Pedro Diniz	Arrows	1:21.258	+2.697
18	19	(Netherlands) Jos Verstappen	Stewart-Ford	1:21.501	+2.940
19	21	(Japan) Toranosuke Takagi	Tyrrell-Ford	1:21.525	+2.964
20	22	(Japan) Shinji Nakano	Minardi-Ford	1:22.078	+3.517
21	23	(Argentina) Esteban Tuero	Minardi-Ford	1:22.146	+3.585
22	20	(Brazil) Ricardo Rosset	Tyrrell-Ford	1:22.822	+4.261
107% time: 1:24.060

=== Race ===
Pos.	No.	Driver	Constructor	Laps	Time/Retired	Grid	Points
1	8	(Finland) Mika Häkkinen	McLaren-Mercedes	67	1:32:14.789	3	10
2	3	(Germany) Michael Schumacher	Ferrari	67	+2.212	1	6
3	7	(United Kingdom) David Coulthard	McLaren-Mercedes	67	+34.164	5	4
4	4	(United Kingdom) Eddie Irvine	Ferrari	67	+58.183	2	3
5	2	(Germany) Heinz-Harald Frentzen	Williams-Mecachrome	67	+1:00.248	7	2
6	5	(Italy) Giancarlo Fisichella	Benetton-Playlife	67	+1:01.360	4	1
7	6	(Austria) Alexander Wurz	Benetton-Playlife	67	+1:04.790	8	
8	1	(Canada) Jacques Villeneuve	Williams-Mecachrome	66	+1 lap	9	
9	9	(United Kingdom) Damon Hill	Jordan-Mugen-Honda	66	+1 lap	10	
10	14	(France) Jean Alesi	Sauber-Petronas	66	+1 lap	11	
11	18	(Brazil) Rubens Barrichello	Stewart-Ford	65	+2 laps	12	
12	11	(France) Olivier Panis	Prost-Peugeot	65	+2 laps	15	
13	19	(Netherlands) Jos Verstappen	Stewart-Ford	65	+2 laps	18	
14	17	(Finland) Mika Salo	Arrows	65	+2 laps	16	
15	22	(Japan) Shinji Nakano	Minardi-Ford	65	+2 laps	20	
16	21	(Japan) Toranosuke Takagi	Tyrrell-Ford	65	+2 laps	19	
Ret	23	(Argentina) Esteban Tuero	Minardi-Ford	56	Engine	21	
Ret	10	(Germany) Ralf Schumacher	Jordan-Mugen-Honda	53	Brakes	6	
Ret	15	(United Kingdom) Johnny Herbert	Sauber-Petronas	37	Engine	13	
Ret	20	(Brazil) Ricardo Rosset	Tyrrell-Ford	36	Engine	22	
Ret	12	(Italy) Jarno Trulli	Prost-Peugeot	6	Transmission	14	
Ret	16	(Brazil) Pedro Diniz	Arrows	6	Hydraulics	17	

== Championship standings after the race ==
- **Bold text** indicates who still has a theoretical chance of becoming World Champion.

Drivers' Championship standings

Pos	Driver	Points
1	(Finland) **Mika Häkkinen**	90
2	(Germany) **Michael Schumacher**	86
3	(United Kingdom) David Coulthard	52
4	(United Kingdom) Eddie Irvine	41
5	(Canada) Jacques Villeneuve	20

Constructors' Championship standings

Pos	Constructor	Points
1	(United Kingdom) **McLaren-Mercedes**	142
2	(Italy) **Ferrari**	127
3	(United Kingdom) Williams-Mecachrome	35
4	(Italy) Benetton-Playlife	33
5	(Republic of Ireland) Jordan-Mugen-Honda	31

- Note: Only the top five positions are included for both sets of standings.

Previous race: 1998 Italian Grand Prix	FIA Formula One World Championship; 1998 season	Next race: 1998 Japanese Grand Prix
Previous race: 1997 Luxembourg Grand Prix	Luxembourg Grand Prix	Next race: N/A; Next race at the Nürburgring: 1999 European Grand Prix
