= 1998 Spanish Grand Prix =

Coordinates: 41°34′9.9″N 2°15′26.9″E

Race 5 of 16 in the 1998 Formula One World Championship
← Previous race	Next race →
- Circuit de Catalunya in Barcelona

Race details
- Date: 10 May 1998
- Official name: XL Gran Premio Marlboro de España
- Location: Circuit de Catalunya, Montmeló, Catalonia, Spain
- Course: Permanent racing facility
- Course length: 4.728 km (2.938 miles)
- Distance: 65 laps, 307.196 km (190.883 miles)
- Weather: Sunny and warm
- Attendance: 70,000

Pole position
Driver	(Finland) Mika Häkkinen	McLaren-Mercedes
- Time: 1:20.262

Fastest lap
Driver	(Finland) Mika Häkkinen	McLaren-Mercedes
- Time: 1:24.275 on lap 25

Podium
First	(Finland) Mika Häkkinen	McLaren-Mercedes
Second	(United Kingdom) David Coulthard	McLaren-Mercedes
Third	(Germany) Michael Schumacher	Ferrari

The 1998 Spanish Grand Prix was a Formula One motor race held on 10 May 1998 at the Circuit de Catalunya. It was the fifth race of the 1998 Formula One season. The 65-lap race was won by McLaren driver Mika Häkkinen after he started from pole position. His teammate David Coulthard finished second and Ferrari driver Michael Schumacher took third.

== Race summary ==
Mika Häkkinen qualified in pole position, 0.7 seconds ahead of his McLaren teammate David Coulthard in second place, with Ferrari's Michael Schumacher a further 0.8 seconds behind in third. The race proved to be a formality for Häkkinen, winning the race ahead of Coulthard in second, and Schumacher in third.

Arrows driver Pedro Diniz started from the pit lane due to stalling on the warm up lap. At the start the McLarens got away well, but Schumacher made a poor start and fell back to fifth behind his teammate Eddie Irvine and Benetton's Giancarlo Fisichella. They ran in these positions until the first round of pit stops, when Irvine delayed Fisichella sufficiently for his teammate Schumacher to emerge ahead of them both and regain third. Fisichella and Irvine continued to battle until lap 28, when Fisichella attempted a passing manoeuvre around the outside of Irvine, resulting in a collision spearing them both off into the gravel trap. This led to Fisichella's Benetton teammate, Alexander Wurz, inheriting fourth place which he held until the finish. Mika Häkkinen was consistently faster than his teammate David Coulthard throughout the race weekend, unable to match his pace, even though they were in the same car. Respected ex driver and pundit Martin Brundle made the comment that Häkkinen was "in a class of his own".

During the race, Michael Schumacher and Minardi's Esteban Tuero were given 10 second stop-go penalties for pit lane speeding.

The Stewart of Rubens Barrichello earned two points by finishing in fifth place, which were team's first of the season, this was made possible by the new engine and chassis the team used (however teammate Jan Magnussen ran with the old chassis). Reigning World Champion Jacques Villeneuve finished in sixth place, after Williams had their worst qualifying result since the 1989 United States Grand Prix.

On the final lap, Williams driver Heinz-Harald Frentzen passed Prost's Jarno Trulli for eight place when Trulli was incorrectly shown the blue flags as the marshalls had mistaken the Williams for a Ferrari.

"I am truly angry because I had to give up a great battle, and it isn't fair to lose a position because they are blind and can't recognise one car from another. Of course it doesn't matter much to finish eighth or ninth, but for a racer it matters. In a case of a blue flag I didn't have an alternative". Jarno Trulli

Post race, Fisichella was given a $7,500USD fine for the collision with Irvine.

== Classification ==
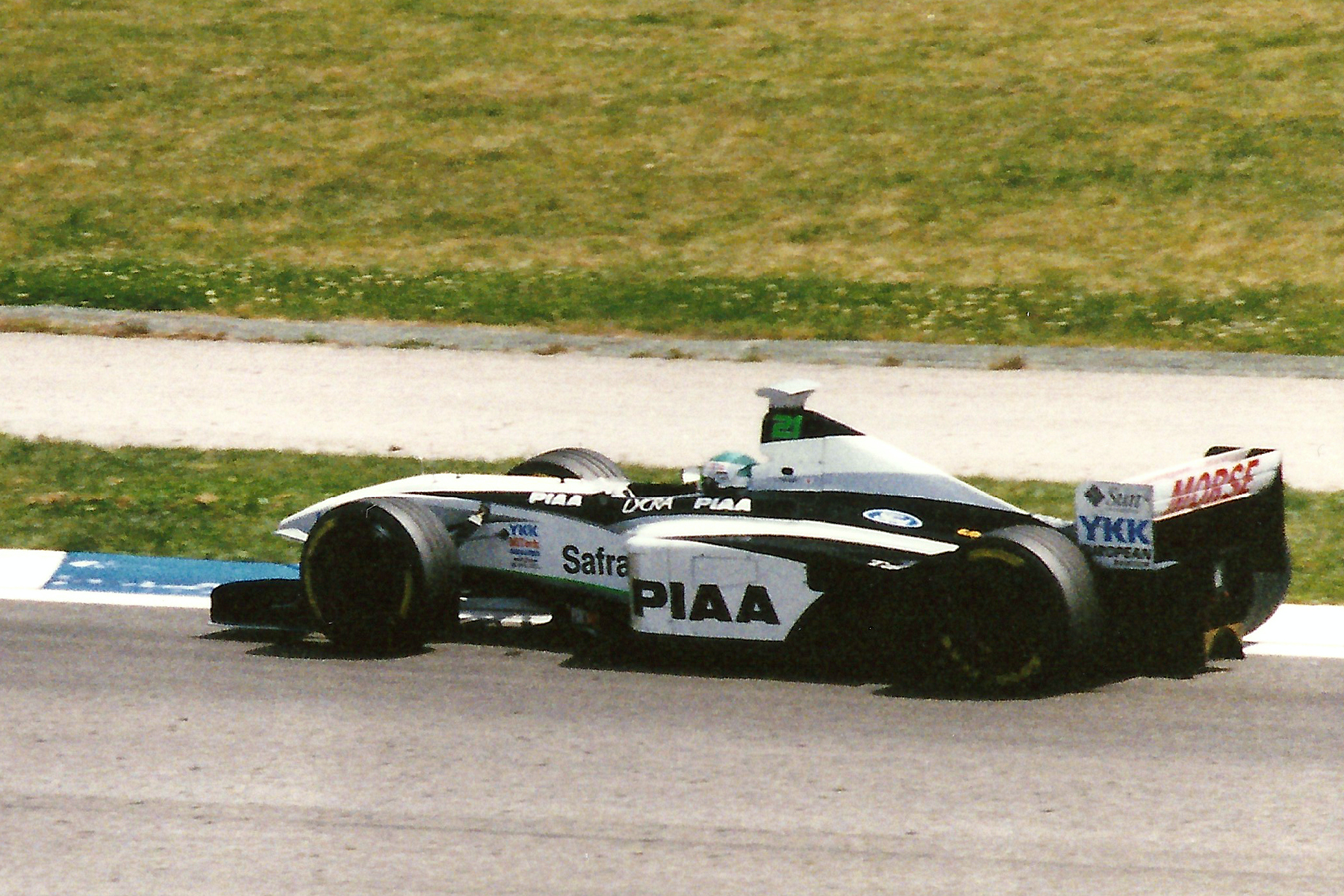
Toranosuke Takagi on his way to qualifying 21st and last on the grid, as his teammate Ricardo Rosset failed to qualify for the Grand Prix, missing the benchmark 107% of the polesitter's time by 0.065 secs.

=== Qualifying ===
Pos	No	Driver	Constructor	Lap Time	Gap
1	8	(Finland) Mika Häkkinen	McLaren-Mercedes	1:20.262	
2	7	(United Kingdom) David Coulthard	McLaren-Mercedes	1:20.996	+0.734
3	3	(Germany) Michael Schumacher	Ferrari	1:21.785	+1.523
4	5	(Italy) Giancarlo Fisichella	Benetton-Playlife	1:21.894	+1.632
5	6	(Austria) Alexander Wurz	Benetton-Playlife	1:21.965	+1.703
6	4	(United Kingdom) Eddie Irvine	Ferrari	1:22.350	+2.088
7	15	(United Kingdom) Johnny Herbert	Sauber-Petronas	1:22.794	+2.532
8	9	(United Kingdom) Damon Hill	Jordan-Mugen-Honda	1:22.835	+2.573
9	18	(Brazil) Rubens Barrichello	Stewart-Ford	1:22.860	+2.598
10	1	(Canada) Jacques Villeneuve	Williams-Mecachrome	1:22.885	+2.623
11	10	(Germany) Ralf Schumacher	Jordan-Mugen-Honda	1:22.927	+2.665
12	11	(France) Olivier Panis	Prost-Peugeot	1:22.963	+2.701
13	2	(Germany) Heinz-Harald Frentzen	Williams-Mecachrome	1:23.197	+2.935
14	14	(France) Jean Alesi	Sauber-Petronas	1:23.327	+3.065
15	16	(Brazil) Pedro Diniz	Arrows	1:23.704	+3.442
16	12	(Italy) Jarno Trulli	Prost-Peugeot	1:23.748	+3.486
17	17	(Finland) Mika Salo	Arrows	1:23.887	+3.625
18	19	(Denmark) Jan Magnussen	Stewart-Ford	1:24.112	+3.850
19	23	(Argentina) Esteban Tuero	Minardi-Ford	1:24.265	+4.003
20	22	(Japan) Shinji Nakano	Minardi-Ford	1:24.538	+4.276
21	21	(Japan) Toranosuke Takagi	Tyrrell-Ford	1:24.722	+4.460
107% time: 1:25.880
DNQ	20	(Brazil) Ricardo Rosset	Tyrrell-Ford	1:25.946	+5.684

=== Race ===
Pos	No	Driver	Constructor	Laps	Time/Retired	Grid	Points
1	8	(Finland) Mika Häkkinen	McLaren-Mercedes	65	1:33:37.621	1	10
2	7	(United Kingdom) David Coulthard	McLaren-Mercedes	65	+9.439	2	6
3	3	(Germany) Michael Schumacher	Ferrari	65	+47.095	3	4
4	6	(Austria) Alexander Wurz	Benetton-Playlife	65	+1:02.538	5	3
5	18	(Brazil) Rubens Barrichello	Stewart-Ford	64	+1 Lap	9	2
6	1	(Canada) Jacques Villeneuve	Williams-Mecachrome	64	+1 Lap	10	1
7	15	(United Kingdom) Johnny Herbert	Sauber-Petronas	64	+1 Lap	7	
8	2	(Germany) Heinz-Harald Frentzen	Williams-Mecachrome	63	+2 Laps	13	
9	12	(Italy) Jarno Trulli	Prost-Peugeot	63	+2 Laps	16	
10	14	(France) Jean Alesi	Sauber-Petronas	63	+2 Laps	14	
11	10	(Germany) Ralf Schumacher	Jordan-Mugen-Honda	63	+2 Laps	11	
12	19	(Denmark) Jan Magnussen	Stewart-Ford	63	+2 Laps	18	
13	21	(Japan) Toranosuke Takagi	Tyrrell-Ford	63	+2 Laps	21	
14	22	(Japan) Shinji Nakano	Minardi-Ford	63	+2 Laps	20	
15	23	(Argentina) Esteban Tuero	Minardi-Ford	63	+2 Laps	19	
16	11	(France) Olivier Panis	Prost-Peugeot	60	Engine	12	
Ret	9	(United Kingdom) Damon Hill	Jordan-Mugen-Honda	46	Engine	8	
Ret	4	(United Kingdom) Eddie Irvine	Ferrari	28	Collision	6	
Ret	5	(Italy) Giancarlo Fisichella	Benetton-Playlife	28	Collision	4	
Ret	17	(Finland) Mika Salo	Arrows	21	Engine	17	
Ret	16	(Brazil) Pedro Diniz	Arrows	20	Engine	15	
DNQ	20	(Brazil) Ricardo Rosset	Tyrrell-Ford		107% Rule		

== Championship standings after the race ==
Drivers' Championship standings

Pos	Driver	Points
1	(Finland) Mika Häkkinen	36
2	(United Kingdom) David Coulthard	29
3	(Germany) Michael Schumacher	24
4	(United Kingdom) Eddie Irvine	11
5	(Austria) Alexander Wurz	9

Constructors' Championship standings

Pos	Constructor	Points
1	(United Kingdom) McLaren-Mercedes	65
2	(Italy) Ferrari	35
3	(United Kingdom) Williams-Mecachrome	14
4	(Italy) Benetton-Playlife	10
5	(Switzerland) Sauber-Petronas	4

- Note: Only the top five positions are included for both sets of standings.

Previous race: 1998 San Marino Grand Prix	FIA Formula One World Championship; 1998 season	Next race: 1998 Monaco Grand Prix
Previous race: 1997 Spanish Grand Prix	Spanish Grand Prix	Next race: 1999 Spanish Grand Prix
