= 1998 German Grand Prix =

Formula One motor race held in 1998

Race 11 of 16 in the 1998 Formula One World Championship
| ← Previous race | Next race → |

Race details
- Date: 2 August 1998
- Official name: Grosser Mobil 1 Preis von Deutschland 1998
- Location: Hockenheimring, Hockenheim, Germany
- Course: Permanent racing facility
- Course length: 6.823 km (4.240 miles)
- Distance: 45 laps, 307.035 km (190.783 miles)
- Weather: Cloudy but dry

Pole position
| Driver | (Finland) Mika Häkkinen | McLaren-Mercedes |
- Time: 1:41.838

Fastest lap
| Driver | (United Kingdom) David Coulthard | McLaren-Mercedes |
- Time: 1:46.116 on lap 17

Podium
| First | (Finland) Mika Häkkinen | McLaren-Mercedes |
| Second | (United Kingdom) David Coulthard | McLaren-Mercedes |
| Third | (Canada) Jacques Villeneuve | Williams-Mecachrome |

The 1998 German Grand Prix (formally the Grosser Mobil 1 Preis von Deutschland 1998) was a Formula One motor race held at the Hockenheimring on 2 August 1998. It was the eleventh round of the 1998 FIA Formula One World Championship. The 45-lap race was won by Mika Häkkinen for McLaren from pole position, with teammate David Coulthard finishing second and Jacques Villeneuve finishing third for Williams.

== Qualifying ==
Mika Häkkinen took pole position ahead of teammate David Coulthard. Jacques Villeneuve qualified in third, in a new long-wheelbase Williams. Ralf Schumacher was fourth.

Michael Schumacher, Häkkinen's main championship rival, qualified ninth after a series of problems throughout practice. Ferrari's long-wheelbase chassis, making its Grand Prix debut, was dismissed by Schumacher after he tried it during the Friday practice sessions. Back in his old car, he spun off on his first lap during first practice on Saturday, and then suffered an engine failure early in second practice.

There were also various mutterings that the Ferraris were off the pace as McLaren had threatened to protest about the Italian team's new braking system, and some were sure it had been removed to the team's obvious detriment.

== Race summary ==
Come the race, the McLarens were dominant, running first and second throughout and only stopping once each. Ralf Schumacher, running on a light fuel load due to his two-stop strategy, looked to be the only driver capable of troubling them in the first part of the race. He managed to stay with the McLarens but he could not pass them.

Lap 24 saw Jos Verstappen retire the Stewart-Ford with a gearbox failure, as Rubens Barrichello retired with the same problem 3 laps later. Villeneuve took over third place when Schumacher made the first of his stops, and this was where he stayed to the finish. By the end, Villeneuve was catching the McLarens because Häkkinen had not taken on enough fuel at his stop, and the Finn had to slow down to reduce his fuel consumption.

Damon Hill, who also one stopped came through to take his first points of the year, finishing ahead of Michael and Ralf Schumacher in fifth and sixth places respectively.

== Classification ==
=== Qualifying ===
| Pos | No | Driver | Constructor | Lap | Gap |
|---|---|---|---|---|---|
| 1 | 8 | (Finland) Mika Häkkinen | McLaren-Mercedes | 1:41.838 | — |
| 2 | 7 | (United Kingdom) David Coulthard | McLaren-Mercedes | 1:42.347 | +0.509 |
| 3 | 1 | (Canada) Jacques Villeneuve | Williams-Mecachrome | 1:42.365 | +0.527 |
| 4 | 10 | (Germany) Ralf Schumacher | Jordan-Mugen-Honda | 1:42.994 | +1.156 |
| 5 | 9 | (United Kingdom) Damon Hill | Jordan-Mugen-Honda | 1:43.183 | +1.345 |
| 6 | 4 | (United Kingdom) Eddie Irvine | Ferrari | 1:43.270 | +1.432 |
| 7 | 6 | (Austria) Alexander Wurz | Benetton-Playlife | 1:43.341 | +1.503 |
| 8 | 5 | (Italy) Giancarlo Fisichella | Benetton-Playlife | 1:43.369 | +1.531 |
| 9 | 3 | (Germany) Michael Schumacher | Ferrari | 1:43.459 | +1.621 |
| 10 | 2 | (Germany) Heinz-Harald Frentzen | Williams-Mecachrome | 1:43.467 | +1.629 |
| 11 | 14 | (France) Jean Alesi | Sauber-Petronas | 1:43.663 | +1.825 |
| 12 | 15 | (United Kingdom) Johnny Herbert | Sauber-Petronas | 1:44.599 | +2.761 |
| 13 | 18 | (Brazil) Rubens Barrichello | Stewart-Ford | 1:44.776 | +2.938 |
| 14 | 12 | (Italy) Jarno Trulli | Prost-Peugeot | 1:44.844 | +3.006 |
| 15 | 21 | (Japan) Toranosuke Takagi | Tyrrell-Ford | 1:44.961 | +3.123 |
| 16 | 11 | (France) Olivier Panis | Prost-Peugeot | 1:45.197 | +3.359 |
| 17 | 17 | (Finland) Mika Salo | Arrows | 1:45.276 | +3.438 |
| 18 | 16 | (Brazil) Pedro Diniz | Arrows | 1:45.588 | +3.750 |
| 19 | 19 | (Netherlands) Jos Verstappen | Stewart-Ford | 1:45.623 | +3.785 |
| 20 | 22 | (Japan) Shinji Nakano | Minardi-Ford | 1:46.713 | +4.875 |
| 21 | 23 | (Argentina) Esteban Tuero | Minardi-Ford | 1:47.265 | +5.427 |
107% time: 1:48.967
| DNQ | 20 | (Brazil) Ricardo Rosset | Tyrrell-Ford | No time^{1} | — |

Notes

- ^1 – Ricardo Rosset was withdrawn from qualifying by Tyrrell after crashing during free practice.

=== Race ===
| Pos | No | Driver | Constructor | Laps | Time/Retired | Grid | Points |
|---|---|---|---|---|---|---|---|
| 1 | 8 | (Finland) Mika Häkkinen | McLaren-Mercedes | 45 | 1:20:47.984 | 1 | 10 |
| 2 | 7 | (United Kingdom) David Coulthard | McLaren-Mercedes | 45 | +0.426 | 2 | 6 |
| 3 | 1 | (Canada) Jacques Villeneuve | Williams-Mecachrome | 45 | +2.577 | 3 | 4 |
| 4 | 9 | (United Kingdom) Damon Hill | Jordan-Mugen-Honda | 45 | +7.185 | 5 | 3 |
| 5 | 3 | (Germany) Michael Schumacher | Ferrari | 45 | +12.613 | 9 | 2 |
| 6 | 10 | (Germany) Ralf Schumacher | Jordan-Mugen-Honda | 45 | +29.738 | 4 | 1 |
| 7 | 5 | (Italy) Giancarlo Fisichella | Benetton-Playlife | 45 | +31.026 | 8 | |
| 8 | 4 | (United Kingdom) Eddie Irvine | Ferrari | 45 | +31.649 | 6 | |
| 9 | 2 | (Germany) Heinz-Harald Frentzen | Williams-Mecachrome | 45 | +32.784 | 10 | |
| 10 | 14 | (France) Jean Alesi | Sauber-Petronas | 45 | +48.371 | 11 | |
| 11 | 6 | (Austria) Alexander Wurz | Benetton-Playlife | 45 | +57.994 | 7 | |
| 12 | 12 | (Italy) Jarno Trulli | Prost-Peugeot | 44 | +1 lap | 14 | |
| 13 | 21 | (Japan) Toranosuke Takagi | Tyrrell-Ford | 44 | +1 lap | 15 | |
| 14 | 17 | (Finland) Mika Salo | Arrows | 44 | +1 lap | 17 | |
| 15 | 11 | (France) Olivier Panis | Prost-Peugeot | 44 | +1 lap | 16 | |
| 16 | 23 | (Argentina) Esteban Tuero | Minardi-Ford | 43 | +2 laps | 21 | |
| Ret | 15 | (United Kingdom) Johnny Herbert | Sauber-Petronas | 37 | Gearbox | 12 | |
| Ret | 22 | (Japan) Shinji Nakano | Minardi-Ford | 36 | Gearbox | 20 | |
| Ret | 18 | (Brazil) Rubens Barrichello | Stewart-Ford | 27 | Gearbox | 13 | |
| Ret | 19 | (Netherlands) Jos Verstappen | Stewart-Ford | 24 | Gearbox | 19 | |
| Ret | 16 | (Brazil) Pedro Diniz | Arrows | 2 | Throttle | 18 | |

== Championship standings after the race ==
- **Bold text** indicates who still has a theoretical chance of becoming World Champion.

Drivers' Championship standings

| Pos | Driver | Points |
|---|---|---|
| 1 | (Finland) **Mika Häkkinen** | 76 |
| 2 | (Germany) **Michael Schumacher** | 60 |
| 3 | (United Kingdom) **David Coulthard** | 42 |
| 4 | (United Kingdom) **Eddie Irvine** | 32 |
| 5 | (Austria) Alexander Wurz | 17 |

Constructors' Championship standings

| Pos | Constructor | Points |
|---|---|---|
| 1 | (United Kingdom) **McLaren-Mercedes** | 118 |
| 2 | (Italy) **Ferrari** | 92 |
| 3 | (Italy) Benetton-Playlife | 32 |
| 4 | (United Kingdom) Williams-Mecachrome | 24 |
| 5 | (Republic of Ireland) Jordan-Mugen-Honda | 7 |

- Note: Only the top five positions are included for both sets of standings.

| Previous race: 1998 Austrian Grand Prix | FIA Formula One World Championship; 1998 season | Next race: 1998 Hungarian Grand Prix |
| Previous race: 1997 German Grand Prix | German Grand Prix | Next race: 1999 German Grand Prix |
