= 1998 French Grand Prix =

Race 8 of 16 in the 1998 Formula One World Championship
← Previous race	Next race →

Race details
- Date: 28 June 1998
- Official name: Mobil 1 Grand Prix de France
- Location: Circuit de Nevers Magny-Cours; Magny-Cours, France
- Course: Permanent racing facility
- Course length: 4.250 km (2.641 miles)
- Distance: 71 laps, 301.564 km (187.383 miles)
- Scheduled distance: 72 laps, 305.814 km (190.024 miles)
- Weather: Sunny, warm

Pole position
Driver	(Finland) Mika Häkkinen	McLaren-Mercedes
- Time: 1:14.929

Fastest lap
Driver	(United Kingdom) David Coulthard	McLaren-Mercedes
- Time: 1:17.523 on lap 59

Podium
First	(Germany) Michael Schumacher	Ferrari
Second	(United Kingdom) Eddie Irvine	Ferrari
Third	(Finland) Mika Häkkinen	McLaren-Mercedes

The 1998 French Grand Prix was a Formula One motor race held at Magny-Cours on 28 June 1998. It was the eighth race of the 1998 FIA Formula One World Championship.

The 71-lap race was won by German driver Michael Schumacher, driving a Ferrari. It was Schumacher's third victory of the season. Northern Irish teammate Eddie Irvine finished second, with Finn Mika Häkkinen third in a McLaren-Mercedes, having started from pole position. The result marked Ferrari's first one-two finish since the 1990 Spanish Grand Prix.

== Report ==
=== Background ===
The race was originally dropped due to a dispute over television broadcasting rights in France. Though TF1 had the rights, rival channel France 3 obtained a judgement from a French court to allow all channels to operate on the grounds of the circuit.

Jos Verstappen replaced Jan Magnussen at the Stewart team for the remainder of the season.

=== Qualifying ===
Mika Häkkinen of McLaren-Mercedes took pole position, beating Michael Schumacher by 0.2 seconds. David Coulthard qualified third, and Eddie Irvine took fourth place. Throughout the qualifying session, Schumacher and Häkkinen exchanged first place, until Häkkinen finally took the pole.

=== Race ===
At the beginning of the race, Verstappen stalled his Stewart, the race was stopped on lap 1, and a restart was required. At the second start, Häkkinen was overtaken by Michael Schumacher and Irvine. Schumacher then began to pull away, sometimes at one second a lap, with Irvine holding both the McLarens behind him. On lap 20, Häkkinen tried an ambitious move on Irvine. His attempt failed, and he spun into the gravel trap. However, he managed to keep his car going, pitted for fresh tyres, and rejoined in fourth place. Then he regained third place when Coulthard had problems during his pit stop: Coulthard went into the pits, but due to a fuel filling problem, had to do another lap, and then go into the pits again. After the second set of pit stops, Häkkinen was back behind Irvine, and Schumacher was some way in front. On the final lap, on the final corner, Häkkinen made an attempt to overtake Irvine, after Irvine was very slow through the chicane before the final corner. Irvine just held off Häkkinen to take second, but only by a tenth of a second. However, both drivers were 19 seconds behind Schumacher. After Coulthard's misfortune in the pitlane, he finished sixth, scoring one world championship point. It was Ferrari's first 1–2 in 8 years, the previous being at the 1990 Spanish Grand Prix, with Alain Prost and Nigel Mansell.

== Classification ==
=== Qualifying ===
Pos	No	Driver	Constructor	Time	Gap
1	8	(Finland) Mika Häkkinen	McLaren-Mercedes	1:14.929	
2	3	(Germany) Michael Schumacher	Ferrari	1:15.159	+0.230
3	7	(United Kingdom) David Coulthard	McLaren-Mercedes	1:15.333	+0.404
4	4	(United Kingdom) Eddie Irvine	Ferrari	1:15.527	+0.598
5	1	(Canada) Jacques Villeneuve	Williams-Mecachrome	1:15.630	+0.701
6	10	(Germany) Ralf Schumacher	Jordan-Mugen-Honda	1:15.925	+0.996
7	9	(United Kingdom) Damon Hill	Jordan-Mugen-Honda	1:16.245	+1.316
8	2	(Germany) Heinz-Harald Frentzen	Williams-Mecachrome	1:16.319	+1.390
9	5	(Italy) Giancarlo Fisichella	Benetton-Playlife	1:16.375	+1.446
10	6	(Austria) Alexander Wurz	Benetton-Playlife	1:16.460	+1.531
11	14	(France) Jean Alesi	Sauber-Petronas	1:16.627	+1.698
12	12	(Italy) Jarno Trulli	Prost-Peugeot	1:16.892	+1.963
13	15	(United Kingdom) Johnny Herbert	Sauber-Petronas	1:16.977	+2.048
14	18	(Brazil) Rubens Barrichello	Stewart-Ford	1:17.024	+2.095
15	19	(Netherlands) Jos Verstappen	Stewart-Ford	1:17.604	+2.675
16	11	(France) Olivier Panis	Prost-Peugeot	1:17.671	+2.742
17	16	(Brazil) Pedro Diniz	Arrows	1:17.880	+2.951
18	20	(Brazil) Ricardo Rosset	Tyrrell-Ford	1:17.908	+2.979
19	17	(Finland) Mika Salo	Arrows	1:17.970	+3.041
20	21	(Japan) Toranosuke Takagi	Tyrrell-Ford	1:18.221	+3.292
21	22	(Japan) Shinji Nakano	Minardi-Ford	1:18.273	+3.344
22	23	(Argentina) Esteban Tuero	Minardi-Ford	1:19.146	+4.217
107% time: 1:20.174

=== Race ===
Pos	No	Driver	Constructor	Laps	Time/Retired	Grid	Points
1	3	(Germany) Michael Schumacher	Ferrari	71	1:34:45.026	2	10
2	4	(United Kingdom) Eddie Irvine	Ferrari	71	+ 19.575	4	6
3	8	(Finland) Mika Häkkinen	McLaren-Mercedes	71	+ 19.747	1	4
4	1	(Canada) Jacques Villeneuve	Williams-Mecachrome	71	+ 1:06.965	5	3
5	6	(Austria) Alexander Wurz	Benetton-Playlife	70	+ 1 lap	10	2
6	7	(United Kingdom) David Coulthard	McLaren-Mercedes	70	+ 1 lap	3	1
7	14	(France) Jean Alesi	Sauber-Petronas	70	+ 1 lap	11	
8	15	(United Kingdom) Johnny Herbert	Sauber-Petronas	70	+ 1 lap	13	
9	5	(Italy) Giancarlo Fisichella	Benetton-Playlife	70	+ 1 lap	9	
10	18	(Brazil) Rubens Barrichello	Stewart-Ford	69	+ 2 laps	14	
11	11	(France) Olivier Panis	Prost-Peugeot	69	+ 2 laps	16	
12	19	(Netherlands) Jos Verstappen	Stewart-Ford	69	+ 2 laps	15	
13	17	(Finland) Mika Salo	Arrows	69	+ 2 laps	19	
14	16	(Brazil) Pedro Diniz	Arrows	69	+ 2 laps	17	
15	2	(Germany) Heinz-Harald Frentzen	Williams-Mecachrome	68	Suspension	8	
16	10	(Germany) Ralf Schumacher	Jordan-Mugen-Honda	68	+ 3 laps	6	
17	22	(Japan) Shinji Nakano	Minardi-Ford	65	Engine	21	
Ret	21	(Japan) Toranosuke Takagi	Tyrrell-Ford	60	Engine	20	
Ret	12	(Italy) Jarno Trulli	Prost-Peugeot	55	Spun off	12	
Ret	23	(Argentina) Esteban Tuero	Minardi-Ford	41	Gearbox	22	
Ret	9	(United Kingdom) Damon Hill	Jordan-Mugen-Honda	19	Hydraulics	7	
Ret	20	(Brazil) Ricardo Rosset	Tyrrell-Ford	16	Hydraulics	18	

== Championship standings after the race ==
Drivers' Championship standings

Pos	Driver	Points
1	(Finland) Mika Häkkinen	50
2	(Germany) Michael Schumacher	44
3	(United Kingdom) David Coulthard	30
4	(United Kingdom) Eddie Irvine	25
5	(Austria) Alexander Wurz	14

Constructors' Championship standings

Pos	Constructor	Points
1	(United Kingdom) McLaren-Mercedes	80
2	(Italy) Ferrari	69
3	(Italy) Benetton-Playlife	27
4	(United Kingdom) Williams-Mecachrome	19
5	(United Kingdom) Stewart-Ford	5

- Note: Only the top five positions are included for both sets of standings.

Previous race: 1998 Canadian Grand Prix	FIA Formula One World Championship; 1998 season	Next race: 1998 British Grand Prix
Previous race: 1997 French Grand Prix	French Grand Prix	Next race: 1999 French Grand Prix
