= 1998 Argentine Grand Prix =

Race 3 of 16 in the 1998 Formula One World Championship
← Previous race	Next race →

Race details
- Date: 12 April 1998
- Official name: XXI Gran Premio Marlboro Argentina
- Location: Autódromo Oscar Alfredo Gálvez; Buenos Aires, Argentina
- Course: Permanent racing facility
- Course length: 4.259 km (2.646 miles)
- Distance: 72 laps, 306.449 km (190.419 miles)
- Weather: Cloudy with variable levels of dryness; temperatures reaching up to 19 °C (66 °F)

Pole position
Driver	(United Kingdom) David Coulthard	McLaren-Mercedes
- Time: 1:25.852

Fastest lap
Driver	(Austria) Alexander Wurz	Benetton-Playlife
- Time: 1:28.179 on lap 39

Podium
First	(Germany) Michael Schumacher	Ferrari
Second	(Finland) Mika Häkkinen	McLaren-Mercedes
Third	(United Kingdom) Eddie Irvine	Ferrari

The 1998 Argentine Grand Prix (formally the XXI Gran Premio Marlboro Argentina) was a Formula One motor race held at Autódromo Oscar Alfredo Gálvez, Buenos Aires, on 12 April 1998. The race is (to date) the last Argentine Grand Prix. It was the third race of the 1998 FIA Formula One World Championship. The 72-lap race was won by Michael Schumacher for the Ferrari team, from a second position start. Mika Häkkinen finished second in a McLaren, with Eddie Irvine third in the other Ferrari car.

== Race summary ==
The two Saubers collided en route to the grid. At the start of the race, Michael Schumacher was caught out by Mika Häkkinen, while David Coulthard maintained his first place. Schumacher passed Häkkinen at the start of the second lap. On the same lap, Eddie Irvine overtook Heinz-Harald Frentzen. By lap 4, Schumacher caught up with Coulthard, and on the next lap the Scotsman took the wrong line, and Schumacher went past. The two cars touched, and Coulthard slid off the track, and rejoined in sixth place. The race then became one between Schumacher, stopping twice, and Häkkinen, on a one-stop strategy. Schumacher's plan proved to be the right one, as he emerged in front following his second stop, after Häkkinen lost time behind Heinz-Harald Frentzen. Behind Häkkinen and the two Ferraris, Jacques Villeneuve was under attack from Jean Alesi and Coulthard. When Esteban Tuero came into the pits, one of his tyres was missing. Eventually, one of the mechanics found it in the garage. Coulthard was slowed by gearbox problems and lost further ground when he tangled with Jacques Villeneuve, putting the Canadian out, while the Scot collected the solitary point for sixth place behind Häkkinen, Eddie Irvine, Alexander Wurz, and Sauber's Jean Alesi. In the lead, Schumacher collected the victory (even having to go off the track and return due to a drizzle that fell at the end of the race).

== Classification ==
=== Qualifying ===
Pos	No	Driver	Constructor	Lap Time	Gap
1	7	(United Kingdom) David Coulthard	McLaren-Mercedes	1:25.852	
2	3	(Germany) Michael Schumacher	Ferrari	1:26.251	+0.399
3	8	(Finland) Mika Häkkinen	McLaren-Mercedes	1:26.632	+0.780
4	4	(United Kingdom) Eddie Irvine	Ferrari	1:26.780	+0.928
5	10	(Germany) Ralf Schumacher	Jordan-Mugen-Honda	1:26.827	+0.975
6	2	(Germany) Heinz-Harald Frentzen	Williams-Mecachrome	1:26.876	+1.024
7	1	(Canada) Jacques Villeneuve	Williams-Mecachrome	1:26.941	+1.089
8	6	(Austria) Alexander Wurz	Benetton-Playlife	1:27.196	+1.344
9	9	(United Kingdom) Damon Hill	Jordan-Mugen-Honda	1:27.483	+1.631
10	5	(Italy) Giancarlo Fisichella	Benetton-Playlife	1:27.836	+1.984
11	14	(France) Jean Alesi	Sauber-Petronas	1:27.839	+1.987
12	15	(United Kingdom) Johnny Herbert	Sauber-Petronas	1:28.016	+2.164
13	21	(Japan) Toranosuke Takagi	Tyrrell-Ford	1:28.811	+2.959
14	18	(Brazil) Rubens Barrichello	Stewart-Ford	1:29.249	+3.397
15	11	(France) Olivier Panis	Prost-Peugeot	1:29.320	+3.468
16	12	(Italy) Jarno Trulli	Prost-Peugeot	1:29.352	+3.500
17	17	(Finland) Mika Salo	Arrows	1:29.617	+3.765
18	16	(Brazil) Pedro Diniz	Arrows	1:30.022	+4.170
19	22	(Japan) Shinji Nakano	Minardi-Ford	1:30.054	+4.202
20	23	(Argentina) Esteban Tuero	Minardi-Ford	1:30.158	+4.306
21	20	(Brazil) Ricardo Rosset	Tyrrell-Ford	1:30.437	+4.585
22	19	(Denmark) Jan Magnussen	Stewart-Ford	1:31.178	+5.326
107% time: 1:31.862

=== Race ===
Pos	No	Driver	Constructor	Laps	Time/Retired	Grid	Points
1	3	(Germany) Michael Schumacher	Ferrari	72	1:48:36.175	2	10
2	8	(Finland) Mika Häkkinen	McLaren-Mercedes	72	+22.898	3	6
3	4	(United Kingdom) Eddie Irvine	Ferrari	72	+57.745	4	4
4	6	(Austria) Alexander Wurz	Benetton-Playlife	72	+1:08.134	8	3
5	14	(France) Jean Alesi	Sauber-Petronas	72	+1:18.286	11	2
6	7	(United Kingdom) David Coulthard	McLaren-Mercedes	72	+1:19.751	1	1
7	5	(Italy) Giancarlo Fisichella	Benetton-Playlife	72	+1:28.437	10	
8	9	(United Kingdom) Damon Hill	Jordan-Mugen-Honda	71	+1 Lap	9	
9	2	(Germany) Heinz-Harald Frentzen	Williams-Mecachrome	71	+1 Lap	6	
10	18	(Brazil) Rubens Barrichello	Stewart-Ford	70	+2 Laps	14	
11	12	(Italy) Jarno Trulli	Prost-Peugeot	70	+2 Laps	16	
12	21	(Japan) Toranosuke Takagi	Tyrrell-Ford	70	+2 Laps	13	
13	22	(Japan) Shinji Nakano	Minardi-Ford	69	+3 Laps	19	
14	20	(Brazil) Ricardo Rosset	Tyrrell-Ford	68	+4 Laps	21	
15	11	(France) Olivier Panis	Prost-Peugeot	65	Engine	15	
Ret	23	(Argentina) Esteban Tuero	Minardi-Ford	63	Spun off	20	
Ret	1	(Canada) Jacques Villeneuve	Williams-Mecachrome	52	Collision	7	
Ret	15	(United Kingdom) Johnny Herbert	Sauber-Petronas	46	Collision	12	
Ret	10	(Germany) Ralf Schumacher	Jordan-Mugen-Honda	22	Suspension	5	
Ret	17	(Finland) Mika Salo	Arrows	18	Gearbox	17	
Ret	19	(Denmark) Jan Magnussen	Stewart-Ford	17	Transmission	22	
Ret	16	(Brazil) Pedro Diniz	Arrows	13	Gearbox	18	

== Championship standings after the race ==
Drivers' Championship standings

Pos	Driver	Points
1	(Finland) Mika Häkkinen	26
2	(Germany) Michael Schumacher	14
3	(United Kingdom) David Coulthard	13
4	(United Kingdom) Eddie Irvine	7
5	(Germany) Heinz-Harald Frentzen	6

Constructors' Championship standings

Pos	Constructor	Points
1	(United Kingdom) McLaren-Mercedes	39
2	(Italy) Ferrari	21
3	(United Kingdom) Williams-Mecachrome	8
4	(Italy) Benetton-Playlife	7
5	(Switzerland) Sauber-Petronas	3

- Note: Only the top five positions are included for both sets of standings.

Previous race: 1998 Brazilian Grand Prix	FIA Formula One World Championship; 1998 season	Next race: 1998 San Marino Grand Prix
Previous race: 1997 Argentine Grand Prix	Argentine Grand Prix	Next race: None
