= 1998 San Marino Grand Prix =

Race 4 of 16 in the 1998 Formula One World Championship
← Previous race	Next race →

Race details
- Date: 26 April 1998
- Official name: XVIII Gran Premio di San Marino
- Location: Autodromo Enzo e Dino Ferrari, Imola, Emilia-Romagna, Italy
- Course: Permanent racing facility
- Course length: 4.933 km (3.065 miles)
- Distance: 62 laps, 305.609 km (189.897 miles)
- Weather: Sunny, 25 °C

Pole position
Driver	(United Kingdom) David Coulthard	McLaren-Mercedes
- Time: 1:25.973

Fastest lap
Driver	(Germany) Michael Schumacher	Ferrari
- Time: 1:29.345 on lap 48

Podium
First	(United Kingdom) David Coulthard	McLaren-Mercedes
Second	(Germany) Michael Schumacher	Ferrari
Third	(United Kingdom) Eddie Irvine	Ferrari

The 1998 San Marino Grand Prix was a Formula One motor race held at Imola on 26 April 1998. The 62-lap race was the fourth round of the 1998 FIA Formula One World Championship and was won by David Coulthard driving a McLaren-Mercedes.

== Race summary ==
It was back to business for McLaren in qualifying, with Coulthard outpacing Häkkinen for pole, and Ferrari's Schumacher and Eddie Irvine keeping things neat by qualifying third and fourth. However, the men in red had hoped for better, and had followed Tyrrell's lead in fitting 'side-wings' - x-shaped wings bolted atop the sideboards. But these appendages did not produce enough of a gain to topple the McLarens and, with Jordan, Sauber and Prost also sprouting these peculiar side-wings the sport's governing body voted to ban them the day after the race, as they felt that they would be unsafe if a driver suffered a side-on impact.

The race was simplicity itself for Coulthard as he controlled proceedings ahead of Mika Häkkinen, with Schumacher split from Irvine by Jacques Villeneuve's Williams. But on lap 17 Häkkinen retired to the pits, and the garage door was immediately rolled down to conceal his problem. It later proved to be a gearbox failure.

Unaware of his teammate's problem, Coulthard motored on ahead of Schumacher until the German emerged from his second stop and started to fly, eating into the Scot's 20-second advantage at a rate of a second per lap. Debris in a sidepod had sent Coulthard's oil cooler temperature soaring, and team boss Ron Dennis kept sprinting from the pit wall to the McLaren garage to check on the telemetry, so that Coulthard could be instructed how much he could afford to ease off to save his engine. Therefore, the Scot could every so often match Schumacher's pace, and he duly recorded the win. Irvine sent the Ferrari fans home happy by taking the final podium place, with the Williams duo of Villeneuve and Frentzen the only other unlapped runners.

== Classification ==
=== Qualifying ===
Pos	No	Driver	Constructor	Lap Time	Gap
1	7	(United Kingdom) David Coulthard	McLaren-Mercedes	1:25.973	
2	8	(Finland) Mika Häkkinen	McLaren-Mercedes	1:26.075	+0.102
3	3	(Germany) Michael Schumacher	Ferrari	1:26.437	+0.464
4	4	(United Kingdom) Eddie Irvine	Ferrari	1:26.705	+0.732
5	6	(Austria) Alexander Wurz	Benetton-Playlife	1:27.273	+1.300
6	1	(Canada) Jacques Villeneuve	Williams-Mecachrome	1:27.390	+1.417
7	9	(United Kingdom) Damon Hill	Jordan-Mugen-Honda	1:27.592	+1.619
8	2	(Germany) Heinz-Harald Frentzen	Williams-Mecachrome	1:27.645	+1.672
9	10	(Germany) Ralf Schumacher	Jordan-Mugen-Honda	1:27.866	+1.893
10	5	(Italy) Giancarlo Fisichella	Benetton-Playlife	1:27.937	+1.964
11	15	(United Kingdom) Johnny Herbert	Sauber-Petronas	1:28.111	+2.138
12	14	(France) Jean Alesi	Sauber-Petronas	1:28.191	+2.218
13	11	(France) Olivier Panis	Prost-Peugeot	1:28.270	+2.297
14	17	(Finland) Mika Salo	Arrows	1:28.798	+2.825
15	21	(Japan) Toranosuke Takagi	Tyrrell-Ford	1:29.073	+3.100
16	12	(Italy) Jarno Trulli	Prost-Peugeot	1:29.584	+3.611
17	18	(Brazil) Rubens Barrichello	Stewart-Ford	1:29.641	+3.668
18	16	(Brazil) Pedro Diniz	Arrows	1:29.932	+3.959
19	23	(Argentina) Esteban Tuero	Minardi-Ford	1:30.649	+4.676
20	19	(Denmark) Jan Magnussen	Stewart-Ford	1:31.017	+5.044
21	22	(Japan) Shinji Nakano	Minardi-Ford	1:31.255	+5.282
22	20	(Brazil) Ricardo Rosset	Tyrrell-Ford	1:31.482	+5.509
107% time: 1:31.991

=== Race ===
Pos	No	Driver	Constructor	Laps	Time/Retired	Grid	Points
1	7	(United Kingdom) David Coulthard	McLaren-Mercedes	62	1:34:24.593	1	10
2	3	(Germany) Michael Schumacher	Ferrari	62	+4.554	3	6
3	4	(United Kingdom) Eddie Irvine	Ferrari	62	+51.775	4	4
4	1	(Canada) Jacques Villeneuve	Williams-Mecachrome	62	+54.590	6	3
5	2	(Germany) Heinz-Harald Frentzen	Williams-Mecachrome	62	+1:17.476	8	2
6	14	(France) Jean Alesi	Sauber-Petronas	61	+1 Lap	12	1
7	10	(Germany) Ralf Schumacher	Jordan-Mugen-Honda	60	+2 Laps	9	
8	23	(Argentina) Esteban Tuero	Minardi-Ford	60	+2 Laps	19	
9	17	(Finland) Mika Salo	Arrows	60	+2 Laps	14	
10	9	(United Kingdom) Damon Hill	Jordan-Mugen-Honda	57	Hydraulics	7	
11	11	(France) Olivier Panis	Prost-Peugeot	56	Engine	13	
Ret	20	(Brazil) Ricardo Rosset	Tyrrell-Ford	48	Engine	22	
Ret	21	(Japan) Toranosuke Takagi	Tyrrell-Ford	40	Engine	15	
Ret	12	(Italy) Jarno Trulli	Prost-Peugeot	34	Throttle	16	
Ret	22	(Japan) Shinji Nakano	Minardi-Ford	27	Engine	21	
Ret	16	(Brazil) Pedro Diniz	Arrows	18	Engine	18	
Ret	8	(Finland) Mika Häkkinen	McLaren-Mercedes	17	Gearbox	2	
Ret	5	(Italy) Giancarlo Fisichella	Benetton-Playlife	17	Spun off	10	
Ret	6	(Austria) Alexander Wurz	Benetton-Playlife	17	Engine	5	
Ret	15	(United Kingdom) Johnny Herbert	Sauber-Petronas	12	Puncture	11	
Ret	19	(Denmark) Jan Magnussen	Stewart-Ford	8	Transmission	20	
Ret	18	(Brazil) Rubens Barrichello	Stewart-Ford	0	Spun off	17	

== Championship standings after the race ==
Drivers' Championship standings

Pos	Driver	Points
1	(Finland) Mika Häkkinen	26
2	(United Kingdom) David Coulthard	23
3	(Germany) Michael Schumacher	20
4	(United Kingdom) Eddie Irvine	11
5	(Germany) Heinz-Harald Frentzen	8

Constructors' Championship standings

Pos	Constructor	Points
1	(United Kingdom) McLaren-Mercedes	49
2	(Italy) Ferrari	31
3	(United Kingdom) Williams-Mecachrome	13
4	(Italy) Benetton-Playlife	7
5	(Switzerland) Sauber-Petronas	4

- Note: Only the top five positions are included for both sets of standings.

Previous race: 1998 Argentine Grand Prix	FIA Formula One World Championship; 1998 season	Next race: 1998 Spanish Grand Prix
Previous race: 1997 San Marino Grand Prix	San Marino Grand Prix	Next race: 1999 San Marino Grand Prix
Awards
Preceded by 1997 Australian Grand Prix	Formula One Promotional Trophy for Race Promoter; 1998	Succeeded by 1999 Malaysian Grand Prix
