= 1998 Canadian Grand Prix =

Race 7 of 16 in the 1998 Formula One World Championship
← Previous race	Next race →

Race details
- Date: 7 June 1998
- Official name: Grand Prix Player's du Canada
- Location: Circuit Gilles Villeneuve, Montreal, Quebec, Canada
- Course: Street circuit
- Course length: 4.421 km (2.747 miles)
- Distance: 69 laps, 305.049 km (189.549 miles)
- Weather: Cool and overcast with air temperatures reaching up to 16.0 °C (60.8 °F); Wind speeds up to 2.9 km/h (1.8 mph) reported

Pole position
Driver	(United Kingdom) David Coulthard	McLaren-Mercedes
- Time: 1:18.213

Fastest lap
Driver	(Germany) Michael Schumacher	Ferrari
- Time: 1:19.379 on lap 48

Podium
First	(Germany) Michael Schumacher	Ferrari
Second	(Italy) Giancarlo Fisichella	Benetton-Playlife
Third	(United Kingdom) Eddie Irvine	Ferrari

The 1998 Canadian Grand Prix was a Formula One motor race held at Circuit Gilles Villeneuve on 7 June 1998. The 69-lap race was the seventh round of the 1998 FIA Formula One World Championship. It was won by Michael Schumacher, however the race is probably best remembered for the crash on the first lap involving Alexander Wurz, Jean Alesi and Jarno Trulli, which resulted in the race being red flagged and restarted, only for another collision to take place between Alesi and Trulli at the same corner, and the race being started once again under the safety car.

== Report ==
=== Qualifying ===
In Montreal, David Coulthard secured his third pole position of the season, achieving the fastest time at the very end of the session. Mika Häkkinen encountered a lot of traffic during his quick laps. Michael Schumacher was third with a lap time only 0.2 seconds behind Coulthard's. The night before qualifying, Eddie Irvine had released a comment saying that the Canadian Grand Prix would be crucial for Ferrari, with Schumacher expressing the same opinion.

=== Race ===
At the start of the race Michael Schumacher started brilliantly and overtook Mika Häkkinen, whilst his brother Ralf Schumacher stalled. It took two attempts to get the race started as Alexander Wurz precipitated a collision, which somersaulted his Benetton above the gravel trap, into the first turn and involving Jean Alesi and Jarno Trulli as well. This carnage brought out the red flag. The race was stopped and Alesi, Wurz and Trulli all took the restart in their spare cars. Herbert was lucky that his mechanics were able to repair his Sauber, as Alesi took the spare. The only damage to the car proved to be a bent suspension arm.

At the second start, Michael Schumacher's Ferrari got a poor start, and was instantly overtaken by Giancarlo Fisichella. However, even more chaos would ensue. Häkkinen's gearbox jammed causing Ralf Schumacher to take avoiding action; he also went across the grass and spun in the middle of the track and then pulled off the track with a broken gearbox. This caused mayhem in the pack behind him. Trulli mounted Alesi's car and in total five cars retired after the second start: Häkkinen (gearbox), Ralf Schumacher (spun off), Alesi and Trulli who were involved in the accident, and Toranosuke Takagi who had transmission problems.

Michael Schumacher managed to overtake Giancarlo Fisichella on the first lap but due to all the retirements the safety car was sent out. After five laps, the safety car came back in and the order was, David Coulthard followed by Schumacher, Fisichella, Jacques Villeneuve, Rubens Barrichello, and Heinz-Harald Frentzen.

As the race got under way again, Coulthard and Michael Schumacher started to pull away from the rest of the field. Coulthard led for the first 13 laps until the safety car came out for the second time. Pedro Diniz had gone off the track and when he rejoined he threw a lot of grass and dirt on to the circuit that needed to be removed. When the safety car went back in, there were another three retirements. Mika Salo collided with Johnny Herbert who went off for the second time, and Coulthard had a transmission problem caused by a throttle linkage failure while battling Michael Schumacher for the lead.

The accident involving Salo and Herbert sent out the safety car for a third time, and Michael Schumacher took advantage by making a pitstop. When he got back out and yellow flags were waved to show that there was to be no overtaking, coming out of the pit lane on lap 20 Schumacher shot across to block Frentzen for turn one. Frentzen steered off the track and onto the grass and spun into the gravel at the end of turn one to retire from the Grand Prix.

Williams team principal, Patrick Head, furious at what had just happened, went to Ferrari team principal Jean Todt to have strong words with him about the racing incident: "We [Williams] will do everything to get him [Schumacher] thrown out of this race and no we will not tolerate it".

As the restart Fisichella led, ahead of Villeneuve, Michael Schumacher, Damon Hill, Magnussen and Shinji Nakano. Villeneuve immediately tried to go around the outside of Fisichella and take the lead in the race at home, but he got it all wrong, went off the track and damaged his rear wing. On lap 35, Schumacher was given a 10-second stop-and-go penalty due to the 'incident' with Frentzen. This momentarily put him behind Hill, but Schumacher overtook him and regained second place on lap 38. Damon Hill had eventually retired on lap 43 with the result of an electrical problem. Then he took the lead on lap 45 when Fisichella went in for his only pit stop. Schumacher then extended his lead over the rest of the pack, and by the time he made his second pit stop to refuel he was able to hold on to his first place, and subsequently finish the race with 16 seconds between himself and second-place finisher Fisichella, with Schumacher's team-mate Eddie Irvine in third, well over a minute behind despite picking up a puncture at the restart. Jan Magnussen finished sixth, scoring his only Formula One point in his last Grand Prix.

== Classification ==
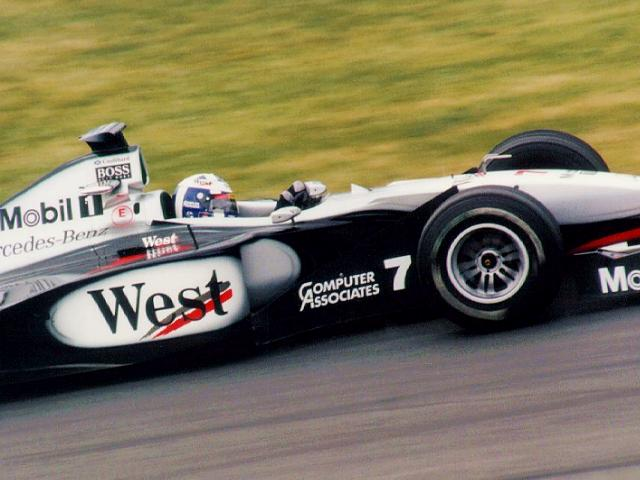
Coulthard took pole position, but retired from the race

=== Qualifying ===
Pos	No	Driver	Constructor	Lap Time	Gap
1	7	(United Kingdom) David Coulthard	McLaren-Mercedes	1:18.213	
2	8	(Finland) Mika Häkkinen	McLaren-Mercedes	1:18.282	+0.069
3	3	(Germany) Michael Schumacher	Ferrari	1:18.497	+0.284
4	5	(Italy) Giancarlo Fisichella	Benetton-Playlife	1:18.826	+0.613
5	10	(Germany) Ralf Schumacher	Jordan-Mugen-Honda	1:19.242	+1.029
6	1	(Canada) Jacques Villeneuve	Williams-Mecachrome	1:19.588	+1.375
7	2	(Germany) Heinz-Harald Frentzen	Williams-Mecachrome	1:19.614	+1.401
8	4	(United Kingdom) Eddie Irvine	Ferrari	1:19.616	+1.403
9	14	(France) Jean Alesi	Sauber-Petronas	1:19.693	+1.480
10	9	(United Kingdom) Damon Hill	Jordan-Mugen-Honda	1:19.717	+1.504
11	6	(Austria) Alexander Wurz	Benetton-Playlife	1:19.765	+1.552
12	15	(United Kingdom) Johnny Herbert	Sauber-Petronas	1:19.845	+1.632
13	18	(Brazil) Rubens Barrichello	Stewart-Ford	1:19.953	+1.740
14	12	(Italy) Jarno Trulli	Prost-Peugeot	1:20.188	+1.975
15	11	(France) Olivier Panis	Prost-Peugeot	1:20.303	+2.090
16	21	(Japan) Toranosuke Takagi	Tyrrell-Ford	1:20.328	+2.115
17	17	(Finland) Mika Salo	Arrows	1:20.536	+2.323
18	22	(Japan) Shinji Nakano	Minardi-Ford	1:21.230	+3.017
19	16	(Brazil) Pedro Diniz	Arrows	1:21.301	+3.088
20	19	(Denmark) Jan Magnussen	Stewart-Ford	1:21.629	+3.416
21	23	(Argentina) Esteban Tuero	Minardi-Ford	1:21.822	+3.609
22	20	(Brazil) Ricardo Rosset	Tyrrell-Ford	1:21.824	+3.611
107% time: 1:23.688

=== Race ===
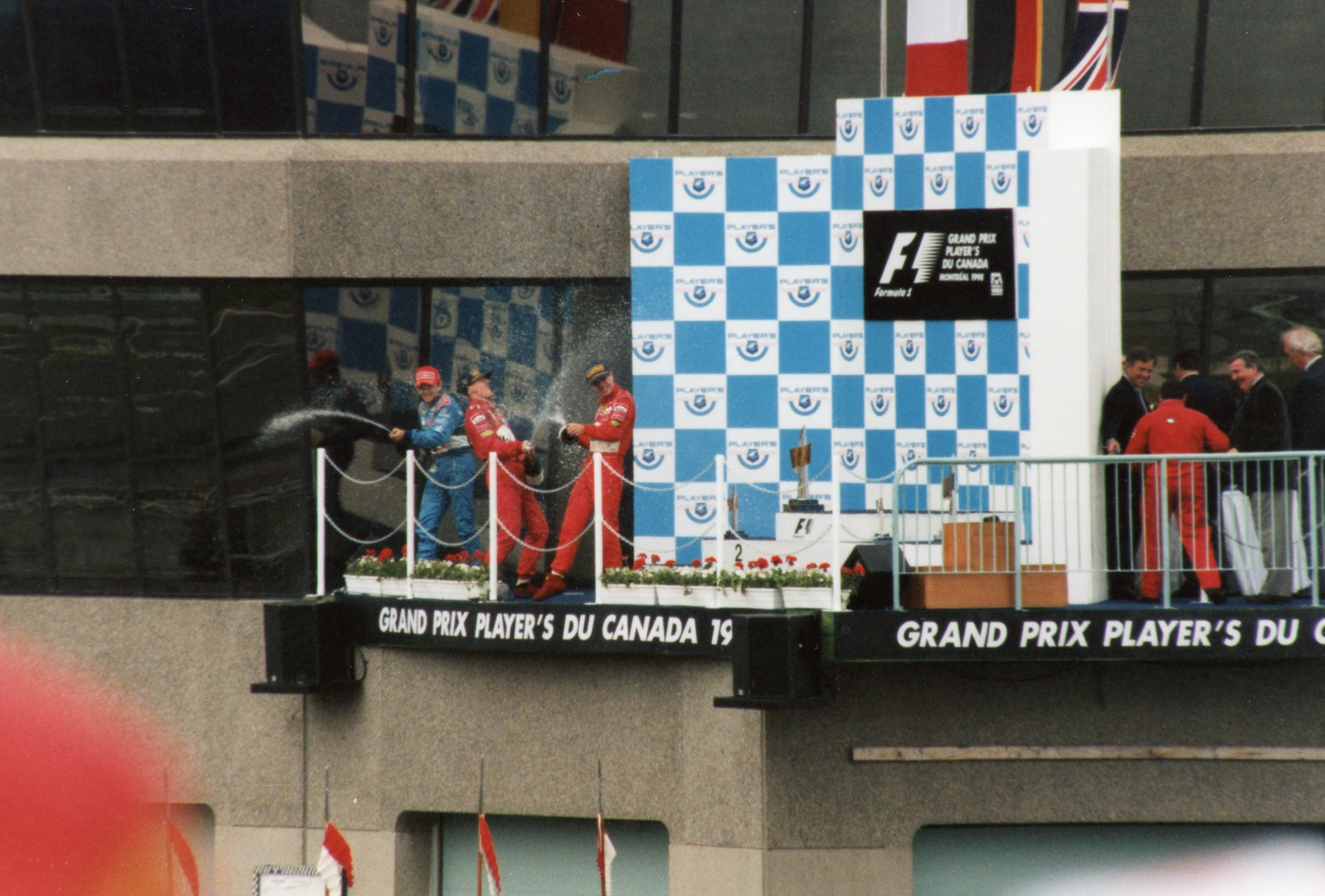
Fisichella, Schumacher, and Irvine on the podium after the race.

Pos	No	Driver	Constructor	Laps	Time/Retired	Grid	Points
1	3	(Germany) Michael Schumacher	Ferrari	69	1:40:57.335	3	10
2	5	(Italy) Giancarlo Fisichella	Benetton-Playlife	69	+16.662	4	6
3	4	(United Kingdom) Eddie Irvine	Ferrari	69	+1:00.059	8	4
4	6	(Austria) Alexander Wurz	Benetton-Playlife	69	+1:03.232	11	3
5	18	(Brazil) Rubens Barrichello	Stewart-Ford	69	+1:21.513	13	2
6	19	(Denmark) Jan Magnussen	Stewart-Ford	68	+1 Lap	20	1
7	22	(Japan) Shinji Nakano	Minardi-Ford	68	+1 Lap	18	
8	20	(Brazil) Ricardo Rosset	Tyrrell-Ford	68	+1 Lap	22	
9	16	(Brazil) Pedro Diniz	Arrows	68	+1 Lap	19	
10	1	(Canada) Jacques Villeneuve	Williams-Mecachrome	63	+6 Laps	6	
Ret	23	(Argentina) Esteban Tuero	Minardi-Ford	53	Electrical	21	
Ret	9	(United Kingdom) Damon Hill	Jordan-Mugen-Honda	42	Electrical	10	
Ret	11	(France) Olivier Panis	Prost-Peugeot	39	Engine	15	
Ret	2	(Germany) Heinz-Harald Frentzen	Williams-Mecachrome	20	Spun off	7	
Ret	7	(United Kingdom) David Coulthard	McLaren-Mercedes	18	Throttle	1	
Ret	15	(United Kingdom) Johnny Herbert	Sauber-Petronas	18	Spun off	12	
Ret	17	(Finland) Mika Salo	Arrows	18	Accident	17	
Ret	8	(Finland) Mika Häkkinen	McLaren-Mercedes	0	Gearbox	2	
Ret	10	(Germany) Ralf Schumacher	Jordan-Mugen-Honda	0	Gearbox	5	
Ret	14	(France) Jean Alesi	Sauber-Petronas	0	Collision	9	
Ret	12	(Italy) Jarno Trulli	Prost-Peugeot	0	Collision	14	
Ret	21	(Japan) Toranosuke Takagi	Tyrrell-Ford	0	Transmission	16	

== Championship standings after the race ==
Drivers' Championship standings

Pos	Driver	Points
1	(Finland) Mika Häkkinen	46
2	(Germany) Michael Schumacher	34
3	(United Kingdom) David Coulthard	29
4	(United Kingdom) Eddie Irvine	19
5	(Italy) Giancarlo Fisichella	13

Constructors' Championship standings

Pos	Constructor	Points
1	(United Kingdom) McLaren-Mercedes	75
2	(Italy) Ferrari	53
3	(Italy) Benetton-Playlife	25
4	(United Kingdom) Williams-Mecachrome	16
5	(United Kingdom) Stewart-Ford	5

- Note: Only the top five positions are included for both sets of standings.

Previous race: 1998 Monaco Grand Prix	FIA Formula One World Championship; 1998 season	Next race: 1998 French Grand Prix
Previous race: 1997 Canadian Grand Prix	Canadian Grand Prix	Next race: 1999 Canadian Grand Prix
