= Minardi M01 =

Formula One racing car

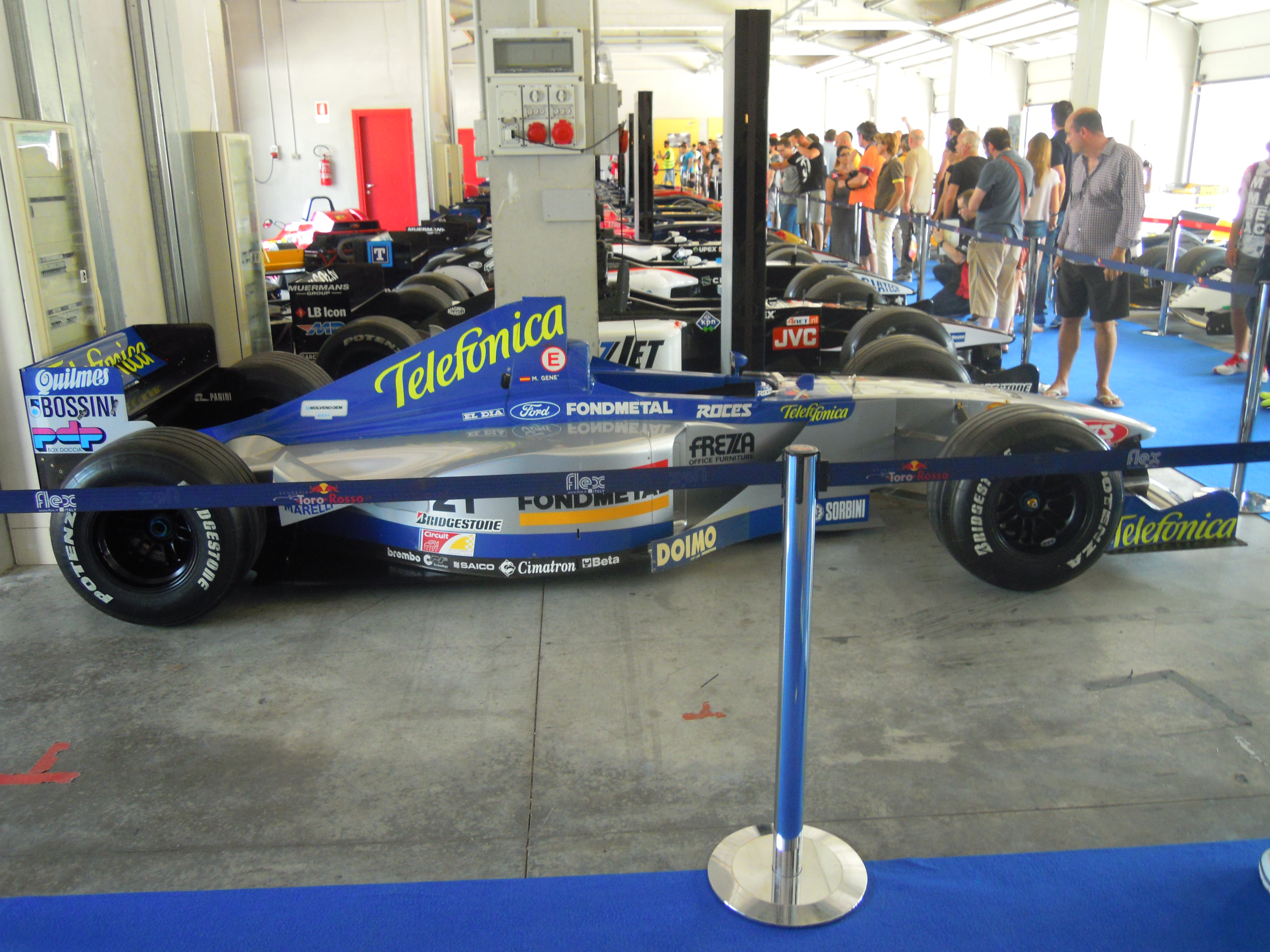
- Category: Formula One
- Constructor: Minardi
- Designers: Gustav Brunner (Technical Director); Gabriele Tredozi (Chief Engineer); George Ryton (Chief Designer); Nigel Cowperthwaite (Chief Aerodynamicist)
- Predecessor: M198
- Successor: M02

Technical specifications
- Chassis: Moulded carbon-fibre composite structure
- Suspension (front): Double wishbones, pushrod with coaxial spring/damper, and torsion bar
- Suspension (rear): Double wishbones, pushrod
- Engine: Ford VJM Zetec-R, 72-degree V10, NA
- Transmission: Minardi six-speed longitudinal sequential semi-automatic
- Power: 735 hp @ 16,000 rpm
- Fuel: Elf
- Tyres: Bridgestone

Competition history
- Notable entrants: Fondmetal Minardi Team
- Notable drivers: 20. (Italy) Luca Badoer; 20. (France) Stéphane Sarrazin; 21. (Spain) Marc Gené
- Debut: 1999 Australian Grand Prix
Races	Wins	Poles	F/Laps
16	0	0	0
- Constructors' Championships: 0
- Drivers' Championships: 0

The Minardi M01 was the car with which the Minardi Formula One team competed in the 1999 Formula One World Championship. It was driven by Italian Luca Badoer, who had previously driven for the team in 1995, and Spaniard Marc Gené, with Frenchman Stéphane Sarrazin deputising for Badoer at the Brazilian Grand Prix.

== Development ==
The Minardi M01 was developed by Gustav Brunner, formerly of Scuderia Ferrari, and long time chief engineer Gabriele Tredozi. The M01 was a completely new design and featured no parts from any former Minardi cars. The M01 was a pioneer of magnesium transmission casing use. The M01 utilised a Ford VJ series V10 engine, alongside electronics from Magneti Marelli.

The M01 had its first shakedown test at Mugello Circuit, Italy on 28 January, 1999. Luca Badoer was at the wheel, with the M01 sporting a carbon fibre livery.

== Racing history ==
On 9 February, 1999 the Minardi M01 was officially unveiled at the headquarters of new sponsor Telefonica in Spain. It was at this event Marc Gene was confirmed as having a race seat for the season. Gastón Mazzacane joined the team ahead of the launch, however by mid February it was confirmed that Ferrari test driver Luca Badoer would race alongside Gene for 1999. Mazzacane would be the teams test driver for 1999. Testing continued in February at Mugello, with Badoer posting times around 1 second slower than Ferrari driver Eddie Irvine.

The season started poorly for the M01. Marc Gene qualified outside of the 107% rule, setting a qualifying time of over 6.5 seconds slower than pole sitter Mika Hakkinen. However, he was allowed to race but both he and Badoer would retire from the Grand Prix. Following the race, Luca Badoer was involved in an accident whilst testing the M01 at Fiorano Circuit, which left him with a broken wrist. He could not compete at the Brazilian Grand Prix and was replaced by Prost Grand Prix test driver Stephane Sarrazin. This would be Sarrazin's only Formula One Grand Prix with Badoer returning to his race seat for the San Marino Grand Prix.

Both M01's would finish the San Marino Grand Prix, however double retirements followed at both Monaco and Spain. Prior to the Canadian Grand Prix, reports suggested Badoer was to be replaced for the remainder of the season with Shinji Nakano linked. Ultimately, this did not materialise.

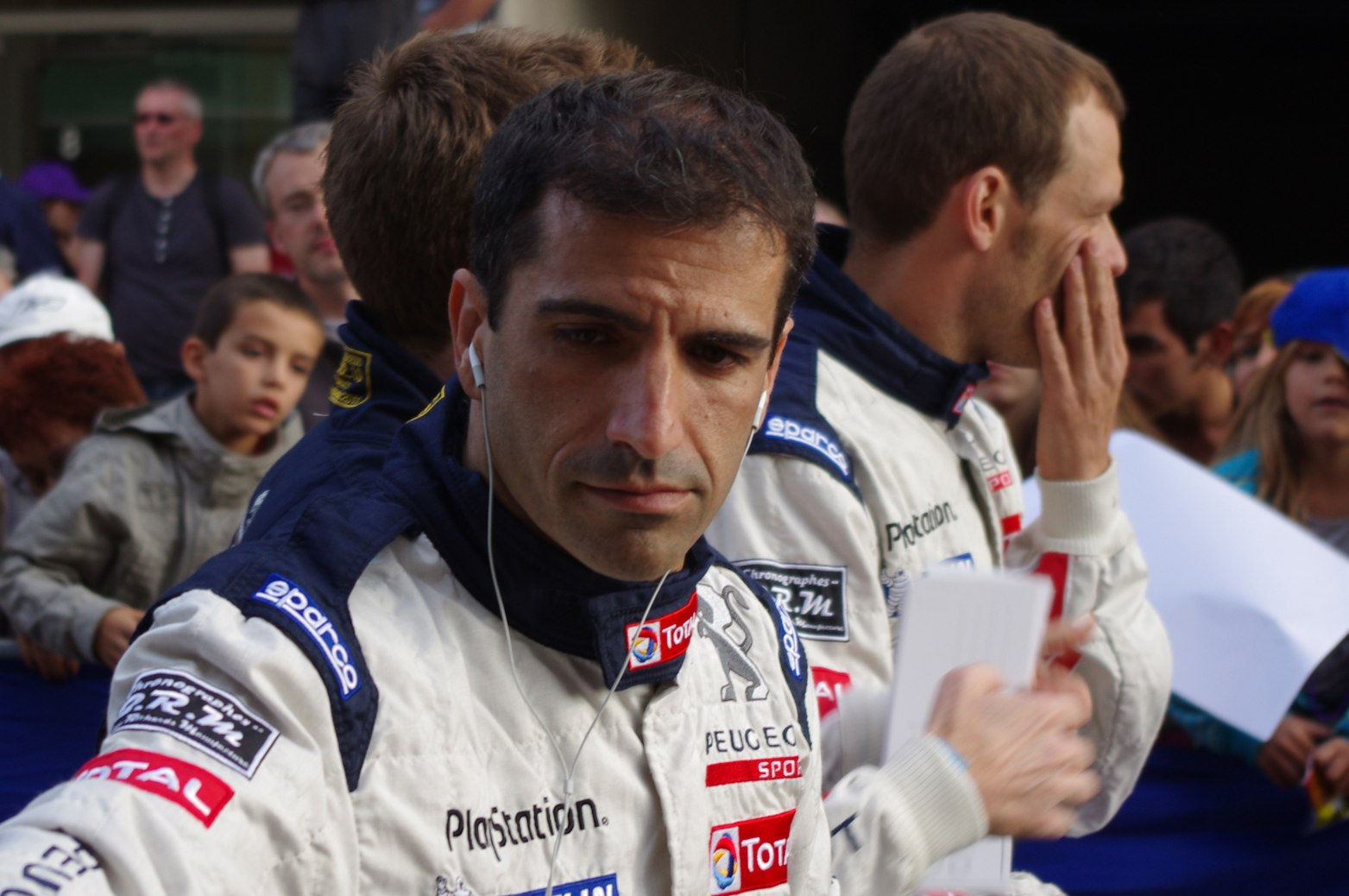
Marc Gene scored Minardi's only point of the season at the 1999 European Grand Prix

The following races were a mix of retirements and distant finishes for both drivers. However, the M01's most significant moment was to come at the European Grand Prix. With changeable weather conditions, strategy errors, accidents including a major one for Pedro Diniz, had left the field in an unusual classification. Luca Badoer looked set to finish in 4th place and score 3 valuable championship points, but with 13 laps remaining he suffered a retirement due to transmission failure. Despite the retirement, rookie teammate Gene was promoted a position and ultimately finished in 6th place, scoring 1 point for the team. Gene would finish 9th at the Malaysian Grand Prix, and retire from the final round of the season. Meanwhile, Badoer chalked up 5 retirements in the final 5 Grand Prix.

The M01 would see Minardi finish in 10th place in the Constructors Championship standings with 1 point, equal with Arrows Grand Prix. However, due to Toranosuke Takagi's 7th place finish to Badoer's highest of 8th, meant that Arrows would be classified ahead. Minardi did outscore the significantly higher funded British American Racing.

Following the conclusion of the season, Minardi used the M01 for a number of driver tests at Jerez. These drivers were Max Wilson, Norberto Fontana, Giorgio Vinella, Peter Sundberg and future Formula One World Champion Fernando Alonso.

== Livery ==
The M01 kept its silver and blue colour scheme from the previous season. The signing of Gené brought along Spanish company Telefónica, which joined Fondmetal as the major sponsors.

== Complete Formula One results ==
(key) (results in bold indicate pole position)

Year	Team	Engine	Tyres	Drivers	1	2	3	4	5	6	7	8	9	10	11	12	13	14	15	16	Points	WCC
1999	Minardi	Ford V10	**B**		AUS	BRA	SMR	MON	ESP	CAN	FRA	GBR	AUT	GER	HUN	BEL	ITA	EUR	MAL	JPN	**1**	**10th**
1999	Minardi	Ford V10	**B**	(Italy) Luca Badoer	Ret		8	Ret	Ret	10	10	Ret	13	10	14	Ret	Ret	Ret	Ret	Ret	**1**	**10th**
1999	Minardi	Ford V10	**B**	(France) Stéphane Sarrazin		Ret															**1**	**10th**
1999	Minardi	Ford V10	**B**	(Spain) Marc Gené	Ret	9	9	Ret	Ret	8	Ret	15	11	9	17	16	Ret	6	9	Ret	**1**	**10th**
