= Minardi M02 =

Formula One racing car

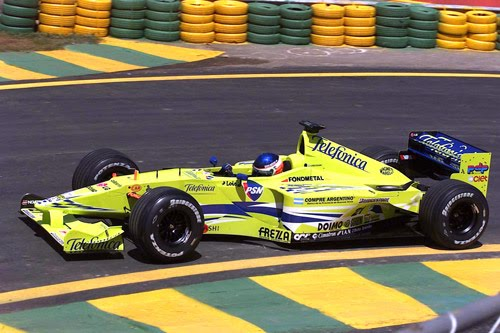
- Gastón Mazzacane in the M02
- Category: Formula One
- Constructor: Minardi
- Designers: Gustav Brunner (Technical Director); Gabriele Tredozi (Chief Engineer); George Ryton (Chief Designer); Nigel Cowperthwaite (Chief Aerodynamicist)
- Predecessor: M01
- Successor: PS01

Technical specifications
- Chassis: Monocoque body in carbon-fibre and aluminium honeycomb composite
- Suspension (front): In carbon push-rod with torsion bars; steel wishbones; F/S shock absorbers
- Suspension (rear): As front
- Length: 4,420 mm (174 in)
- Width: 1,800 mm (71 in)
- Height: 950 mm (37 in)
- Axle track: Front: 1,452 mm (57 in); Rear: 1,420.7 mm (56 in)
- Wheelbase: 3,050 mm (120 in)
- Engine: 1998-spec Ford Zetec-R (badged as Fondmetal) 3.0 L (183 cu in) V10 (72°) naturally-aspirated mid-mounted
- Transmission: Minardi titanium 6-speed longitudinal semi-automatic sequential
- Power: 770 hp @ 15,800 rpm
- Weight: 600 kg (1,323 lb)
- Fuel: Elf
- Lubricants: Elf
- Brakes: Brembo 6-piston calipers, carbon discs and pads
- Tyres: Bridgestone Potenza

Competition history
- Notable entrants: Telefónica Minardi Fondmetal
- Notable drivers: 20. (Spain) Marc Gené; 21. (Argentina) Gastón Mazzacane
- Debut: 2000 Australian Grand Prix
- Last event: 2000 Malaysian Grand Prix
Races	Wins	Poles	F/Laps
17	0	0	0
- Constructors' Championships: 0
- Drivers' Championships: 0

The Minardi M02 was the car with which the Minardi Formula One team competed in the 2000 Formula One World Championship.

== Development ==
The M02 was designed by Gustav Brunner. The car was a clear development from the M01 featuring new pointed nose cone, compact sides and high exhausts. The M02 developed the titanium cased gearbox from 1999 even further, which helped with weight. The M02 was the first F1 car to adopt set down brake callipers in a seasonal development. The M02 continued using the Ford Cosworth V10 engine which was the same power unit from 1998. It was badged Fondmetal.

== Drivers ==
For 2000, Marc Gene was retained by Minardi and began his second season with the team. Brazilian driver Max Wilson was signed as the second driver, but was replaced with Gastón Mazzacane before the season started as the Argentine brought more sponsor money to the team. Reigning Euro Open by Nissan champion Fernando Alonso was the teams test driver. Ahead of the European Grand Prix at the Nurburgring, Giorgio Vinella was recruited as an additional test driver to support development of the M02.

== Racing history ==
The M02 was launched on 16 February, 2000 at the Guggenheim Museum in Bilbao. Testing work began on the car in January with Gene and Mazzacane running new parts on the M01 chassis at Fiorano Circuit. In February, Minardi joined tests at Barcelona and showed good pace, Gene securing a fastest lap time of the week that put him in 9th place overall, ahead of Jordan, Jaguar and Prost. Mazzacane was consistently around 1 second slower than his team mate.

The season began well for Gene, qualifying the M02 in 18th place and finishing the race in 8th. Mazzacane qualified last and retired on lap 40 with gearbox failure. The M02 would not finish the next two races for Gene, and Mazzacane finished four Grand Prix before breaking into the top 10 for the first time at the 2000 European Grand Prix. By Monaco, a race in which both cars failed to finish, the M02 had chalked up six race retirements.

The remainder of the season was a myriad of retirements and disappointments for the M02, it was firmly off the pace. At Belgium, Minardi celebrated their 250th Grand Prix. A highlight of the season was at the 2000 United States Grand Prix USA Grand Prix in Indianapolis, when Mazzacane managed to find himself in third position early on in the race ahead of reigning world champion Mika Hakkinen. He would however ultimately retire due to engine problems.

The M02 eventually finished a de facto tenth in the Constructors' Championship, with no points but ahead of Prost due to a better finishing record. The team therefore qualified for some of the sport's television revenues in 2001.

Following the conclusion of the season, Gabriele Rumi was looking to sell his 70 percent stake in the team. Sponsor PSN were announced as purchasing this in September 2000, which would have tied in with their driver Mazzacane remaining with the team. However by November they had pulled out of the deal. PSN and Mazzacane would ultimately switch to Prost Grand Prix for 2001. Gene also left for Williams, along with key sponsor Telefónica. Paul Stoddart purchased Minardi from Rumi, and the M02 would be the last car produced under his leadership of the team.

== Sponsorship and livery ==
For 2000, Minardi had extensive financial backing from Telefonica, which became the title sponsors for the season. The cars were painted in a bold fluorescent yellow finish to reference the partnership.

In Belgian, Minardi celebrated their 250th Grand Prix, and their cars had a sticker on the side pontoon commemorating the achievement, reading "250 GP".

== Complete Formula One results ==
(key) (results in bold indicate pole position)

Year	Team	Engine	Tyres	Drivers	1	2	3	4	5	6	7	8	9	10	11	12	13	14	15	16	17	Points	WCC
2000	Minardi	Fondmetal RV10 V10*	**B**		AUS	BRA	SMR	GBR	ESP	EUR	MON	CAN	FRA	AUT	GER	HUN	BEL	ITA	USA	JPN	MAL	0	NC
2000	Minardi	Fondmetal RV10 V10*	**B**	(Spain) Marc Gené	8	Ret	Ret	14	14	Ret	Ret	16^{†}	15	8	Ret	15	14	9	12	Ret	Ret	0	NC
2000	Minardi	Fondmetal RV10 V10*	**B**	(Argentina) Gastón Mazzacane	Ret	10	13	15	15	8	Ret	12	Ret	12	11	Ret	17	10	Ret	15	13^{†}	0	NC

* Denotes Cosworth-built engines, badged as Fondmetal.
