= 2000 European Grand Prix =

6th round of the 2000 Formula One season

Race 6 of 17 in the 2000 Formula One World Championship
← Previous race	Next race →
- The Nürburgring (last modified in 1995)

Race details
- Date: 21 May 2000
- Official name: 2000 Warsteiner Grand Prix of Europe
- Location: Nürburgring, Nürburg, Rhineland-Palatinate, Germany
- Course: Permanent racing facility
- Course length: 4.556 km (2.831 mi)
- Distance: 67 laps, 305.252 km (189.675 mi)
- Weather: Dry at first, rain later on, Air: 11 °C (52 °F), Track: 12 °C (54 °F)
- Attendance: 142,000

Pole position
Driver	(United Kingdom) David Coulthard	McLaren-Mercedes
- Time: 1:17.529

Fastest lap
Driver	(Germany) Michael Schumacher	Ferrari
- Time: 1:22.269 on lap 8

Podium
First	(Germany) Michael Schumacher	Ferrari
Second	(Finland) Mika Häkkinen	McLaren-Mercedes
Third	(United Kingdom) David Coulthard	McLaren-Mercedes

The 2000 European Grand Prix (officially the 2000 Warsteiner Grand Prix of Europe) was a Formula One motor race held on 21 May 2000, at the Nürburgring in Nürburg, Rhineland-Palatinate, Germany, in front of 142,000 spectators. It was the sixth round of the 2000 Formula One World Championship, as well as the ninth Formula One European Grand Prix. Michael Schumacher of Ferrari won the 67-lap race after starting second. McLaren's Mika Häkkinen finished second and teammate David Coulthard finished third.

Michael Schumacher led the World Drivers' Championship heading into the race, while Ferrari led the World Constructors' Championship. Coulthard earned his ninth career pole position by setting the fastest qualifying lap. His teammate Häkkinen made a brisk getaway from third to take the lead into the first corner. He led for the first ten laps until Michael Schumacher overtook him on lap 11. On lap 12, heavy rain forced the entire field to make pit stops to switch from dry compound to wet-weather tyres. Michael Schumacher led until his second pit stop on lap 36, when he handed over the lead to Häkkinen for the next nine laps before regaining it. Michael Schumacher won the race, with Häkkinen finishing second 13.822 seconds later and Coulthard finishing third one lap later. It was Schumacher's fourth win of the season and his 39th of his career.

The race result extended Michael Schumacher's lead over Häkkinen in the World Drivers' Championship to 18 championship points. Coulthard remained third and increased his lead over the second Ferrari of Rubens Barrichello in fourth. Ferrari extended their lead over second-placed McLaren in the World Constructors' Championship to ten championship points. Despite not scoring any championship points, Williams remained in third, while Benetton passed Jordan for fourth place with eleven races of the season left.

== Background ==
The 2000 European Grand Prix was the sixth of seventeen races in the 2000 Formula One World Championship and the ninth event in the series' history. It was held at the 13-turn 4.556 mi (7.332 km) Nürburgring in the German town of Nürburg, Rhineland-Palatinate on 21 May 2000, having been moved to May from September due to the inclusion of the United States Grand Prix to the calendar. It was the fifth European Grand Prix to happen at the Nürburgring. Sole tyre supplier Bridgestone brought the Soft and Extra Soft dry compound tyres as well as the soft and hard wet-weather compounds to the event.

Michael Schumacher led the World Drivers' Championship with 36 championship points entering the race. Mika Häkkinen of McLaren was second with 22 championship points, and his teammate David Coulthard was third, another two championship points behind. Rubens Barrichello in the second Ferrari was fourth with 13 championship points and Williams' Ralf Schumacher was fifth with 12 championship points. Ferrari (49 championship points) led McLaren by seven championship points in the World Constructors' Championship. Williams was third with 15 championship points. Jordan and Benetton competed for fourth place.

After the Spanish Grand Prix on 7 May 2000, the teams conducted in-season testing to prepare for the event. The McLaren, Sauber, Benetton, Jordan, Arrows, British American Racing (BAR) and Williams teams tested at the Circuito de Jerez between 9 and 11 May. Coulthard missed the test to rest after suffering three broken ribs in a plane crash in Lyon. His teammate Häkkinen led the first day of testing and BAR driver Ricardo Zonta led the second. Alexander Wurz set the fastest lap for the Benetton team on the final day. The Prost team tested the AP03's aerodynamic components over three days at the Circuit de Nevers Magny-Cours with driver Nick Heidfeld. Luca Badoer spent three days at the Fiorano Circuit practising pit stops and testing the F1-2000's aerodynamic and mechanical setups. At the Mugello Circuit, Barrichello tested a new engine and tyres for the car.

Michael Schumacher won the season's first three races, putting him well ahead of Häkkinen, who had reliability issues in Australia and Brazil. Coulthard then won the British Grand Prix, while Häkkinen won the Spanish Grand Prix, after Michael Schumacher's poor performance in both races. Häkkinen said the gap was not significant given the season's remaining twelve races and that he was better able to handle pressure, "In this sport something weird always happens. If I were in Michael's shoes I would be getting a little bit worried at seeing us pick up two wins in a row – more than that, two 1–2 finishes." Coulthard said he would not let three broken ribs slow him down and hoped McLaren would finish first and second, "We are slowly chipping away at Michael's lead, but he has had this amazing run of luck and has finished every race in the points this season so it is still going to be difficult. But I am very confident, given my recent results, though it is still hard thinking about those six points I lost in Brazil when I was disqualified."

There were no changes from the season entry list for the 11 teams (each represented by a different constructor). Some teams modified their cars for the race. Both Ferrari and McLaren installed a revised aerodynamic package, primarily to improve their cars' qualifying performance. Ferrari introduced the 049B engine, as well as smaller Brembo brake callipers and lighter disc pads. McLaren installed cooling chimneys on both sides of the MP4/15 to aid in heat dissipation. Williams brought new cast titanium uprights, which they did not use in the previous Spanish Grand Prix. BAR used a new Honda engine and a revised version of its Xtrac-designed gearbox in its 002 cars. Minardi installed a revised front wing specification to their M02s following wind tunnel testing, and the team continued to use a cast titanium gearbox in Gastón Mazzacane's car.

== Practice ==
Before the race on Sunday, four practice sessions were held: two one-hour sessions on Friday and two 45-minute sessions on Saturday. The Friday practice sessions took place in cool, variable weather. Overnight rain created a wet track that dried during the day. Michael Schumacher set the fastest time of 1:21.092, followed by BAR's Jacques Villeneuve, the Jordan duo of Heinz-Harald Frentzen and Jarno Trulli, Barrichello, Coulthard, Zonta, Häkkinen and Pedro Diniz for Sauber in positions two through ten. Häkkinen's tyres locked at the Dunlop Curve corner during his final lap of the session, leaving him beached in the turn's gravel trap.

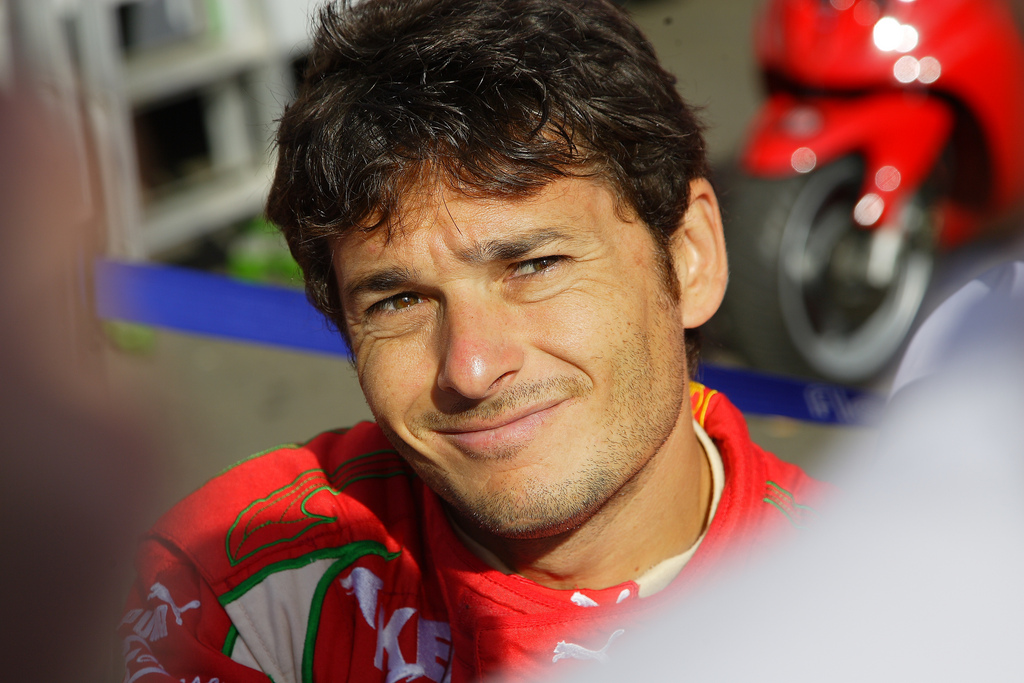
Giancarlo Fisichella (pictured in 2010) crashed his Benetton car in the second practice session

Rain fell between the conclusion of the morning session and the start of the afternoon session. It continued to fall at the north section of the track in the early minutes of the second session before drying and lap times improved sufficiently over the next 20 minutes. Jenson Button set the day's fastest lap of 1:19.808 with one minute remaining in the session thanks to a light fuel load and a new set of tyres on his Williams FW22. Wurz was 0.440 seconds slower in second. Häkkinen and Coulthard were third and fourth for McLaren. Michael Schumacher, Ralf Schumacher, Trulli, Zonta, Heidfeld, and Villeneuve completed the top ten. An engine fault curtailed Ralf Schumacher's running and Giancarlo Fisichella damaged his Benetton car's left-hand side against a trackside tyre barrier. Coulthard spun on a kerb at the Veedol chicane.

The weather was cold and overcast on Saturday morning. In the third practice session, Michael Schumacher lapped fastest at 1:18.527, ahead of Häkkinen, Frentzen, Coulthard, Pedro de la Rosa of the Arrows team, Ralf Schumacher, Zonta, Villeneuve, Button and Barrichello. Arrows driver Jos Verstappen's running was curtailed after 17 minutes due to smoke billowing from his engine. Button struck the track's kerbs, spun, and crashed into the tyre barrier.

Michael Schumacher's time did not improve; he remained the fastest driver in the fourth practice session. In second, Barrichello was driving faster, but finished the session 0.227 seconds slower than his teammate. Häkkinen and Coulthard dropped to third and fourth, respectively, while Frentzen fell to fifth. Fisichella improved to sixth, with Villeneuve, Ralf Schumacher, De la Rosa and Trulli completing the top ten. During the session, Coulthard slid into a gravel trap at turn three though he rejoined the track without any apparent damage. He stopped at the side of the circuit at the Ford Kurve and track marshals extricated his car into an escape road. Marc Gené spun his Minardi car at the Castrol-S chicane and Ralf Schumacher drove into the grass after running deep at the Veedol chicane.

== Qualifying ==
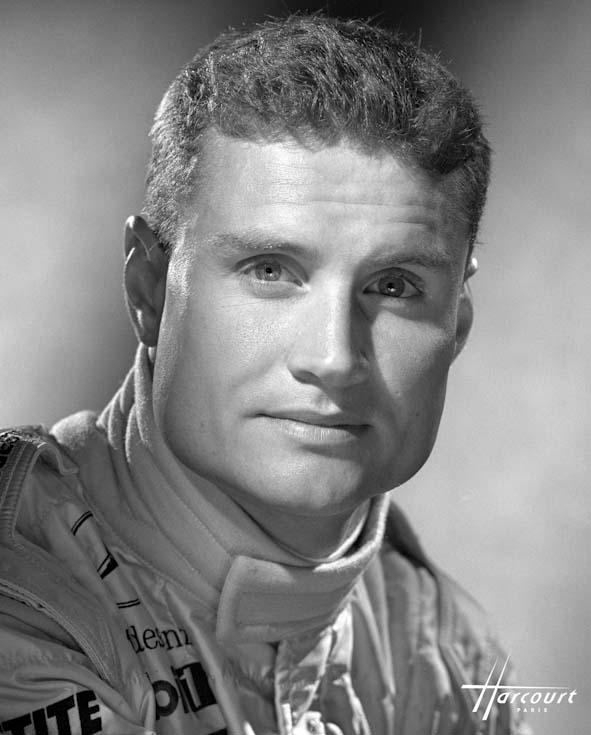
David Coulthard (pictured in 1999) took his first pole position in Formula One since the 1998 Canadian Grand Prix and the ninth of his career.

During Saturday's one-hour qualifying session, each driver was limited to twelve laps, with the starting order determined by their fastest qualifying laps. The 107% rule was in effect during this session, requiring each driver to stay within 107% of the fastest lap time in order to qualify for the race. The circuit was damp from an earlier rain shower, and more rain was forecast, prompting teams to install the extra soft compound tyres on their cars, and drivers ventured onto the track early in qualifying. A heavy rainstorm made the track slippery in the final 25 minutes, preventing drivers from lapping faster and determining the starting grid. Every driver exited the pit lane with two minutes of qualifying remaining in order to maximise the benefit of driving on a dry circuit. Coulthard took McLaren's first pole position in event history, his first since the 1998 Canadian Grand Prix and the ninth of his career with a lap of 1 minute and 17.529 seconds set 26 minutes in. Michael Schumacher, who had the pole position until Coulthard's time and ran wide at the Ford Kurve, joined him on the front row. This formation continued on the second row, with Häkkinen third after not feeling confident in his car's setup and Barrichello fourth after driver errors on his first two timed laps. Fifth-placed Ralf Schumacher was caught out by the change in conditions on a timed lap and went straight on at the Veedol chicane. Trulli, nursing a perforated eardrum, improved in the final minutes to go sixth, while Fisichella in seventh was delayed by Ralf Schumacher at the Coca-Cola Kurve.

Jaguar's Eddie Irvine was baulked by one of the Prost cars en route to eighth. Villeneuve in ninth failed to begin a fourth timed lap before qualifying ended. Frentzen qualified tenth as Verstappen slowed his first timed lap. Button, 11th, bemoaned entering the track earlier than planned for his first timed lap, and slower traffic hampered his final lap. A strategic error by the Arrows team left De la Rosa 12th and his teammate Verstappen 14th. They were separated by Heidfeld who fell from ninth to 13th in qualifying's final moments because he did not start a fourth timed lap. Wurz was caught out by the weather change and took 15th. Diniz in 16th missed an opportunity to begin his final timed lap and Johnny Herbert's Jaguar was 17th. After his race car's electronic management system shut down the gearbox, Jean Alesi in 18th switched to the spare Prost setup for teammate Heidfeld. He spun on the wet track and returned to the pit lane to retake his race car until the gearbox failed. Zonta qualified 19th because his car's setup slowed him and another driver prevented him from setting his final timed lap because the session ended less than a second before he crossed the start/finish line. Sauber's Mika Salo was another driver who missed the cut-off time for his final timed lap and took 20th. Because of slower traffic, Gené and his teammate Mazzacane qualified 21st and 22nd, respectively.

=== Post-qualifying ===
When Heidfeld's car was pushed onto the weighbridge during qualifying, it was discovered to be 2 kg (4.4 lb) under the 600 kg (1,300 lb) minimum weight limit. This resulted in a one-tenth of a second improvement per lap but had no effect on his qualifying time. The Prost squad was summoned to meet the stewards and accepted that the car was underweight. The stewards disqualified Heidfeld from the race in accordance with Formula One's Technical Regulations. The Prost team filed no appeal. Prost stated Gilles Alegeot, Heidfeld's race engineer, had committed an "unforgivable mistake" for not accounting for weight-saving changes elsewhere on the vehicle with the inclusion of additional ballast.

=== Qualifying classification ===
Pos	No.	Driver	Constructor	Time	Gap
1	2	(United Kingdom) David Coulthard	McLaren-Mercedes	1:17.529	—
2	3	(Germany) Michael Schumacher	Ferrari	1:17.667	+0.138
3	1	(Finland) Mika Häkkinen	McLaren-Mercedes	1:17.785	+0.256
4	4	(Brazil) Rubens Barrichello	Ferrari	1:18.227	+0.698
5	9	(Germany) Ralf Schumacher	Williams-BMW	1:18.515	+0.986
6	6	(Italy) Jarno Trulli	Jordan-Mugen-Honda	1:18.612	+1.083
7	11	(Italy) Giancarlo Fisichella	Benetton-Playlife	1:18.697	+1.168
8	7	(United Kingdom) Eddie Irvine	Jaguar-Cosworth	1:18.703	+1.174
9	22	(Canada) Jacques Villeneuve	BAR-Honda	1:18.742	+1.213
10	5	(Germany) Heinz-Harald Frentzen	Jordan-Mugen-Honda	1:18.830	+1.301
11	10	(United Kingdom) Jenson Button	Williams-BMW	1:18.887	+1.358
12	18	(Spain) Pedro de la Rosa	Arrows-Supertec	1:19.024	+1.495
EX^{1}	15	(Germany) Nick Heidfeld	Prost-Peugeot	1:19.147	+1.618
13	19	(Netherlands) Jos Verstappen	Arrows-Supertec	1:19.190	+1.661
14	12	(Austria) Alexander Wurz	Benetton-Playlife	1:19.378	+1.849
15	16	(Brazil) Pedro Diniz	Sauber-Petronas	1:19.422	+1.893
16	8	(United Kingdom) Johnny Herbert	Jaguar-Cosworth	1:19.638	+2.109
17	14	(France) Jean Alesi	Prost-Peugeot	1:19.651	+2.122
18	23	(Brazil) Ricardo Zonta	BAR-Honda	1:19.766	+2.237
19	17	(Finland) Mika Salo	Sauber-Petronas	1:19.814	+2.285
20	20	(Spain) Marc Gené	Minardi-Fondmetal	1:20.162	+2.633
21	21	(Argentina) Gastón Mazzacane	Minardi-Fondmetal	1:21.015	+3.486
107% time: 1:22.956

Notes

- ^1 – Nick Heidfeld was found to have a car 2 kg (4.4 lb) underweight and was barred from the race.

== Warm-up ==
A 30-minute warm-up session on Sunday morning took place in cool and dry weather. All drivers fine-tuned their race set-ups and set laps in their spare cars. Michael Schumacher set the fastest time in the session's final seconds, 1:20.251. Häkkinen in second was nine thousandths of a second slower. The top ten included Frentzen, Barrichello, Verstappen, Coulthard, De la Rosa, Villeneuve, Irvine, and Trulli. Near the end of the session, Fisichella's car's left rear wheel detached, and a track marshal retrieved it as it rolled onto the track.

== Race ==
The 67-lap race began at 14:00 local time and drew 142,000 spectators. The weather was overcast and dry at first with an 80% chance of rain. The air temperature was 11 °C (52 °F) and the track temperature 12 °C (54 °F). Except for Villeneuve, Verstappen, Barrichello, and Michael Schumacher, all drivers began on the soft compound tyre. Coulthard, on a dry-weather setup, was slow to react due to an unstable rear of his car; his teammate Häkkinen made a brisk getaway to drive in-between Coulthard and Michael Schumacher and take the lead going into the Castrol-S chicane despite brief contact with Schumacher. Villeneuve moved from ninth to fifth by driving on the outside. Ralf Schumacher turned left to draw alongside Villeneuve and held fourth place as Villeneuve went onto the grass. Further down the field, Trulli and Fisichella collided at the Castrol-S chicane, breaking Trulli's left-rear suspension and he stopped at the side of the track to retire. Frentzen was forced into the gravel at the same corner by the two Arrows, allowing them and Diniz to pass. Going downhill to the Dunlop chicane, Villeneuve stopped Ralf Schumacher from passing him for fifth.

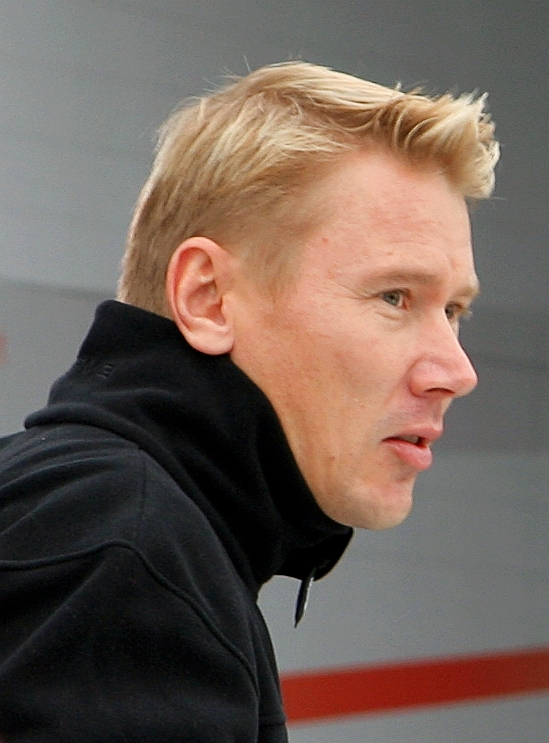
Mika Häkkinen (pictured in 2006) led the first ten laps before he finished in second place.

At the end of the first lap, Häkkinen was 0.562 seconds ahead of Michael Schumacher, who was 0.998 seconds ahead of Coulthard in third. Barrichello was fourth, Villeneuve fifth, and Ralf Schumacher sixth. On lap two, Michael Schumacher set the fastest lap at the time, completing the circuit in 1 minute and 22.438 seconds. On the same lap, De la Rosa overtook teammate Verstappen for ninth and Alesi passed Button for 13th. Frentzen retired on lap three with smoke billowing from the rear of his car due to a piston sealing a gap between the engine's combustion chamber and crankcase failing. At the front, another fastest lap from Michael Schumacher lowered Häkkinen's advantage to 0.4 seconds. A lack of rear grip affected Coulthard's handling and the fourth-placed Barrichello pressured him. Villeneuve in fifth was distanced by the top four. On lap four, Ralf Schumacher was passed by Fisichella for sixth and De ;a Rosa overtook Irvine for eighth. Fisichella drew close to Villeneuve in fifth as De la Rosa overtook Ralf Schumacher for seventh two laps later.

On the eighth lap, Michael Schumacher set the race's overall fastest lap, a 1:22.269 lap in which he used less of the track than Häkkinen. Villeneuve made a driver error at the Veedol chicane on lap nine, allowing Fisichella's better traction and car handling to steer right out of the turn and pass Villeneuve into the Coca-Cola Kurve. Light rain began to fall on the tenth lap. Cresting a hill to the Veedol chicane on lap 11, Michael Schumacher slipstreamed Häkkinen, and put him wide, making a pass to the left for the lead. Häkkinen lost traction and Michael Schumacher led by four-tenths-of-a-second at the end of the lap. The rain became more intense on the next lap and the track became slippery Barrichello had a better exit from the Coca-Cola Kurve and overtook Coulthard for third on the start/finish straight. Further back, Irvine passed Ralf Schumacher at the Veedol chicane for eighth and Wurz lost tenth to Alesi. The rain made teams unsure whether to pit for wet-weather tyres though Herbert began the pit stop phase at the end of lap 12.

In clear air, Michael Schumacher extended his lead on the damp track over Häkkinen to more than five seconds by the 13th lap. Gené spun onto the grass and damaged the front wing on the lap for which he entered the pit lane to have it replaced. McLaren abandoned Häkkinen's heavy fuel load strategy, allowing him to drive with more fuel than most drivers before a late race pit stop. Coulthard made his first pit stop on the next lap; Michael Schumacher and Häkkinen followed on lap 15. Michael Schumacher's refueller discovered no fuel had been inserted into the car for three seconds before resetting the fuel nozzle. Häkkinen's pit crew struggled to fit the right-rear wheel on his car, keeping him stationary for an additional ten seconds. Michael Schumacher rejoined the race ahead of Coulthard, while Häkkinen dropped to fifth. Coulthard turned left into turn three, attempting an overtake on Michael Schumacher, who responded by blocking Coulthard's path. Barrichello led one lap before his pit stop on lap 16 and Ralf Schumacher followed suit. Because he spent longer on the wet track on the dry compound tyres than his teammate, Barrichello emerged in ninth and Michael Schumacher regained the lead. On the 19th lap, Fisichella drove right to pass De la Rosa going downhill to the Dunlop-Kurve hairpin for fourth and repelled the latter's manoeuvre to retake the position.

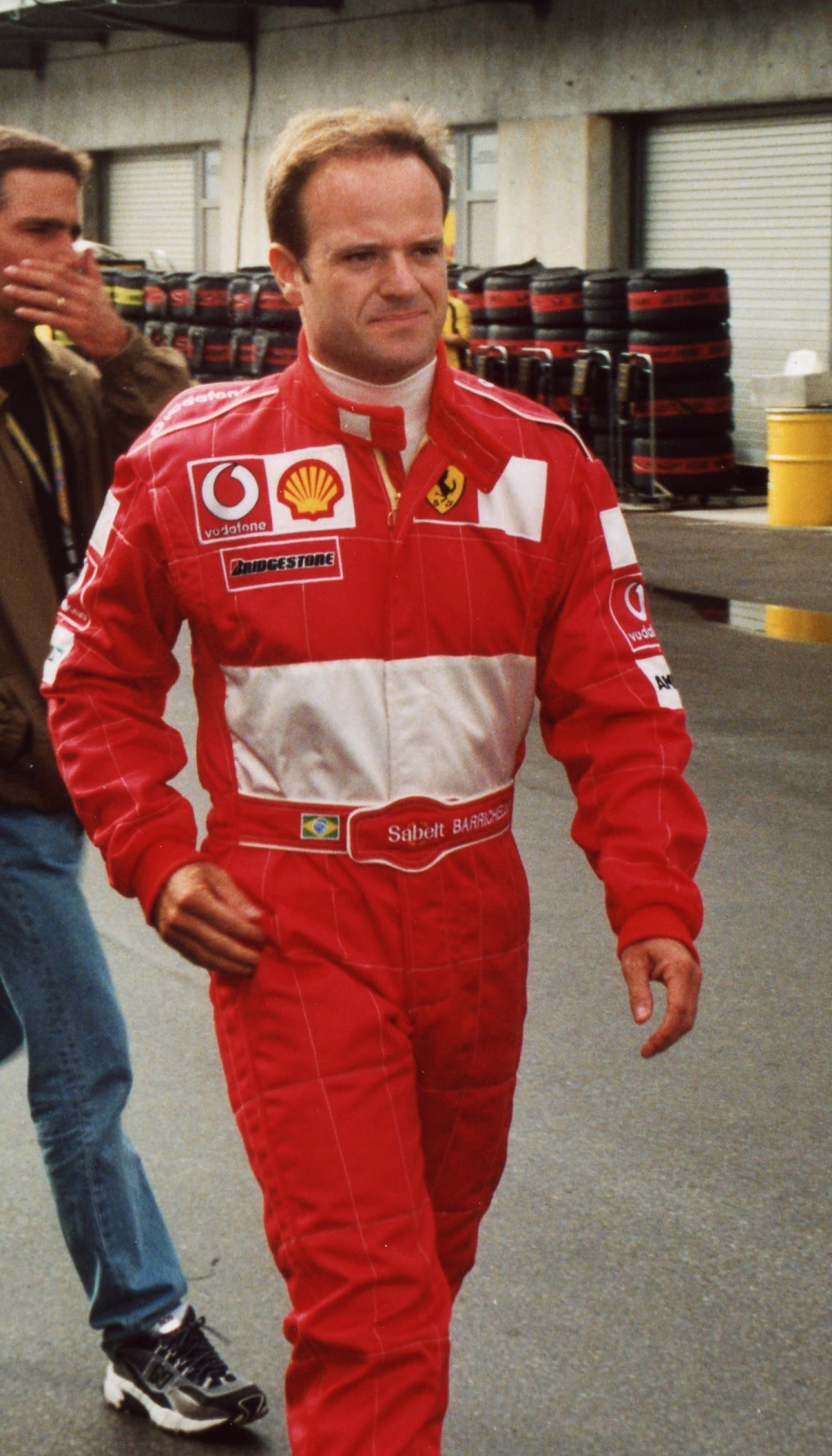
Rubens Barrichello (pictured in 2002) was switched to a three-stop strategy and finished fourth

By the 20th lap, Häkkinen lapped fastest to close the gap to Michael Schumacher by two seconds per lap, while his teammate Coulthard had lost seven seconds to the latter. Coulthard went to the left of the Veedol chicane, allowing teammate Häkkinen to pass him for second on the next lap. Michael Schumacher lost control of his car at the Veedol chicane on lap 22 but kept the lead. Further back, Barrichello overtook Verstappen, Irvine and Ralf Schumacher to return to fifth place by lap 23. Two laps later, Ralf Schumacher passed Herbert for ninth. On lap 28, Salo's car suffered a driveshaft failure, causing him to lose control and retire in a gravel trap. At the end of lap 29, Verstappen overtook Irvine on the outside as they exited the Coca-Cola Kurve for seventh. Irvine tried to reclaim seventh by outbraking Verstappen into the Castrol-S chicane. He lost rear grip after the apex and slid into the side of Verstappen's car. Ralf Schumacher spun into the back of the Jaguar as Irvine spun in front of him. At turn three, Ralf Schumacher spun onto the grass, and Irvine's rear wing detached. The loss of downforce beached Irvine in the gravel trap, as Verstappen spun and crashed against the right-side tyre barrier exiting the Ford Kurve. Despite the rain increasing in intensity and the debris on the circuit, the safety car was not deployed.

Further up the field, Barrichello caught and overtook Fisichella into the Veedol chicane for fourth on lap 32. On the next lap, he entered the pit lane as Ferrari's technical director, Ross Brawn, switched Barrichello to a three-stop strategy to better recover positions on wet tyres on a wet track. On lap 35, Michael Schumacher made a pit stop for enough fuel to finish the race. On lap 36, Häkkinen took the lead with Schumacher second. He in his lighter fuelled McLaren increased the lead to 25.6 seconds by lap 40 since Michael Schumacher had a heavily fuelled car. Three laps later, Alesi overtook Wurz for tenth. Häkkinen had delayed his second pit stop for ten laps; unable to build up a large enough lead due to slower traffic, he led by 21.9 seconds by lap 44. He and teammate Coulthard made their final pit stops on lap 45, rejoining in second and fifth place, respectively. After their pit stops, Michael Schumacher led Häkkinen by 12.5 seconds with the yet-to-stop De la Rosa third. On lap 46, Villeneuve was told to enter the pit lane to retire from fifth because his team detected an engine fault linked to a valve issue via telemetry. De la Rosa made his stop on the 48th lap, moving Barichello to third and Coulthard to fourth. On that lap, Gené retired with a failed accelerator throttle.

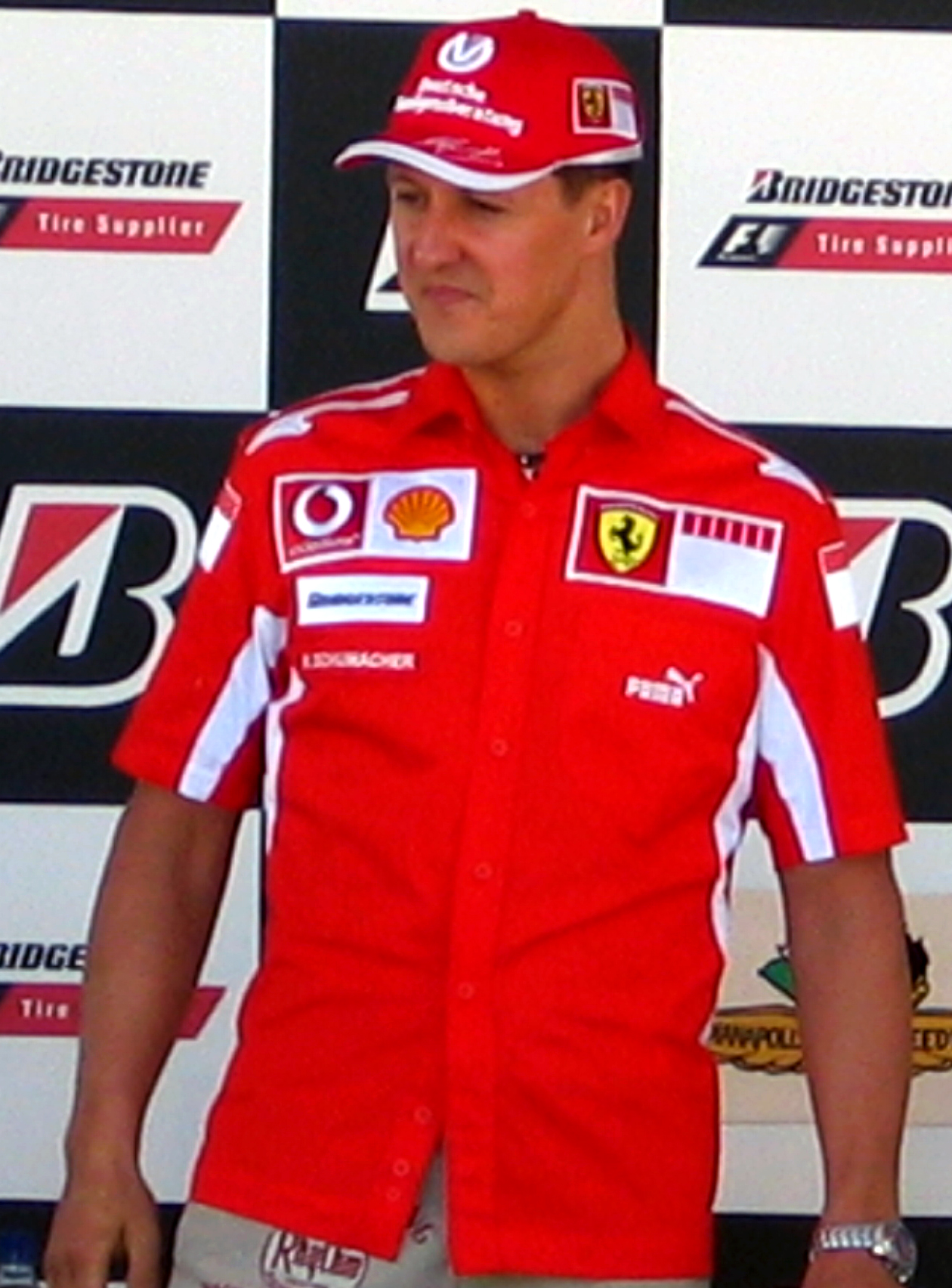
Michael Schumacher (pictured in 2005) took his fourth win of the season and the 39th of his career.

On lap 49, Button was duelling Herbert when he ran into the back of Herbert's car at the slow Veedol chicane, causing a hole in the leading edge of the Williams' front wing that Button failed to notice; both drivers remained on the circuit and continued. Barrichello made the race's final pit stop on lap 51. Barrichello gained seven seconds on Coulthard, but the gap was insufficient for Barrichello to maintain third place, and he dropped to fourth. Zonta's rear wheels locked under braking three laps later, sending him spinning into a gravel trap and then beaching on a kerb. Wurz outbraked Button going uphill towards the Veedol chicane on lap 61 to take tenth. On the next lap, Wurz went to the right of Herbert, who remained wide to allow Wurz to negotiate the Coca-Cola Kurve. Wurz was 16 km/h (9.9 mph) faster than Herbert and collided with him. Both cars spun 180 degrees into a gravel trap and retired. Their retirements moved Button to seventh. He remained there until enough water penetrated the hole in his front wing, causing a sudden electrical fault that shut down the engine on lap 65.

Unhindered in the final 19 laps, Michael Schumacher negotiated his way past slower traffic while aquaplaning on worn tyres, finishing first for his fourth victory of the season and 39th of his career in a time of 1 hour, 42 minutes, and 0.307 seconds at an average speed of 179.540 km/h (111.561 mph). Häkkinen came in second 13.822 seconds later after losing five seconds overtaking the slower cars of Herbert, Button, Wurz and Zonta, and was the only other driver on the lead lap. and his teammate Coulthard was one lap behind in third due to a mechanical issue. Barrichello was close to Coulthard in fourth. Fisichella took fifth and De la Rosa registered Arrows' first points-scoring finish of 2000 in sixth. Diniz improved eight places from his starting position of 15th to finish seventh, despite spinning three times early in the race. Mazzacane raced without incident, rising from 21st to eighth. Alesi finished last after four pit stops from a faulty gearbox and a ten-second stop-and-go penalty due to a faulty pit lane speed limiter button on his steering wheel that caused him to exceed the pit lane speed limit of 80 km/h (50 mph). The attrition rate was high, with 9 of the 21 starters finishing the race.

=== Post-race ===
The top three drivers collected their trophies to the podium and later spoke to the media at a press conference. Michael Schumacher, who received the winners trophy from the German Chancellor Gerhard Schröder and European Commission president Romano Prodi, stated that none of the leaders made pit stops on lap 12 because they did not want to install wet-weather tyres and discover they were slower than the slick dry compounds, "We knew [the heavy rain] would come, but nobody had any idea whether it would start then or later. So obviously it was difficult. Then some drivers started to come in for rain tyres, and as soon as we saw they were faster we went straight in too." Häkkinen said his start from third to first was one of the best of his career, "[When you're third on the grid] that's the only chance to get through. You can immediately improve your position, and I was happy to do it because the disappointment I had in qualifying was fixed." Coulthard expressed his gratitude for finishing third, calling it "one of my most difficult races" due to a lack of rear car grip, adding, "But I knew from following other cars myself that visibility was very bad. So I just concentrated on driving my car and waiting to see where I would finish when it was over."

Barrichello was disappointed to finished fourth because he felt he could have been on the podium, "Three-stops was definitely the way to make up lost time, but it was very difficult to overtake other cars in the spray. I have been looking forward to a close fought-race for some time now, and maybe I should have been on the podium today." De la Rosa achieved his first points of the season and his best finish since the 1999 Australian Grand Prix. The Arrows team owner Tom Walkinshaw said the driver's sixth-place finish would produce "a good foundation for the team to aspire to do better", and De la Rosa stated the result made up a poor start of the season, "We will try now, we will have to do it. I had some very good first laps and was always with the group but not because of drivers going out – this was just a deserved point." Wurz apologised to Herbert for the collision between the two at the Coca-Cola Kurve in the race's final laps. Frentzen called the event "a very disappointing weekend all round" for him and that "things have just not gone our way – and that is frustrating when you know your car is competitive."

Irvine argued the three-car collision at the Castrol-S chicane on lap 30 lost him an opportunity to score points and Verstappen echoed similar feelings. Ralf Schumacher said he could not avoid the accident, "I saw the accident coming between Jos and Eddie and I expected them both to slide off onto the inside. But as Irvine's back end moved right in front of me, I had no way of getting out of the way." The new World Drivers' Championship lead between Michael Schumacher and Mika Häkkinen was 18 championship points in the former's favour. Coulthard was third with 24 championship points, one championship point ahead of fourth-placed Barrichello. Ralf Schumacher maintained fifth place with 12 championship points. Ferrari extended its lead over McLaren in the World Constructors' Championship by three championship points. Williams maintained third place while Benetton passed Jordan for fourth with eleven races remaining in the season.

=== Race classification ===
Drivers who scored championship points are denoted in bold.

Pos	No.	Driver	Constructor	Laps	Time/Retired	Grid	Points
1	3	**(Germany) Michael Schumacher**	**Ferrari**	67	1:42:00.307	2	10
2	1	**(Finland) Mika Häkkinen**	**McLaren-Mercedes**	67	+13.822	3	6
3	2	**(United Kingdom) David Coulthard**	**McLaren-Mercedes**	66	+1 Lap	1	4
4	4	**(Brazil) Rubens Barrichello**	**Ferrari**	66	+1 Lap	4	3
5	11	**(Italy) Giancarlo Fisichella**	**Benetton-Playlife**	66	+1 Lap	7	2
6	18	**(Spain) Pedro de la Rosa**	**Arrows-Supertec**	66	+1 Lap	12	1
7	16	(Brazil) Pedro Diniz	Sauber-Petronas	65	+2 Laps	15	
8	21	(Argentina) Gastón Mazzacane	Minardi-Fondmetal	65	+2 Laps	21	
9	14	(France) Jean Alesi	Prost-Peugeot	65	+2 Laps	17	
10	10	(United Kingdom) Jenson Button	Williams-BMW	62	Electrical	11	
11	8	(United Kingdom) Johnny Herbert	Jaguar-Cosworth	61	Collision	16	
12	12	(Austria) Alexander Wurz	Benetton-Playlife	61	Collision	14	
Ret	23	(Brazil) Ricardo Zonta	BAR-Honda	51	Spun off	18	
Ret	20	(Spain) Marc Gené	Minardi-Fondmetal	47	Throttle	20	
Ret	22	(Canada) Jacques Villeneuve	BAR-Honda	46	Engine	9	
Ret	7	(United Kingdom) Eddie Irvine	Jaguar-Cosworth	29	Collision	8	
Ret	19	(Netherlands) Jos Verstappen	Arrows-Supertec	29	Spun off/Accident	13	
Ret	9	(Germany) Ralf Schumacher	Williams-BMW	29	Collision	5	
Ret	17	(Finland) Mika Salo	Sauber-Petronas	27	Halfshaft/Spun off	19	
Ret	5	(Germany) Heinz-Harald Frentzen	Jordan-Mugen-Honda	2	Engine	10	
Ret	6	(Italy) Jarno Trulli	Jordan-Mugen-Honda	0	Collision	6	
EX	15	(Germany) Nick Heidfeld	Prost-Peugeot	—	Excluded	—	

== Championship standings after the race ==
Drivers' Championship standings

+/–	Pos	Driver	Points
	1	(Germany) Michael Schumacher	46
	2	(Finland) Mika Häkkinen	28
	3	(United Kingdom) David Coulthard	24
	4	(Brazil) Rubens Barrichello	16
	5	(Germany) Ralf Schumacher	12

Constructors' Championship standings

+/–	Pos	Constructor	Points
	1	(Italy) Ferrari	62
	2	(United Kingdom) McLaren-Mercedes	52
	3	(United Kingdom) Williams-BMW	15
1	4	(Italy) Benetton-Playlife	10
1	5	(Republic of Ireland) Jordan-Mugen-Honda	9
Sources:

- Note: Only the top five positions are included for both sets of standings.

Previous race: 2000 Spanish Grand Prix	FIA Formula One World Championship; 2000 season	Next race: 2000 Monaco Grand Prix
Previous race: 1999 European Grand Prix	European Grand Prix	Next race: 2001 European Grand Prix
