= M198 (disambiguation) =

M198 usually refers to the M198 howitzer, a medium-sized, towed artillery piece. M198 or M-198 may also refer to:

- M-198 (Michigan highway), a former state highway in Michigan
- Minardi M198, a 1998 Formula One racecar
