= Minardi M197 =

Formula One racing car

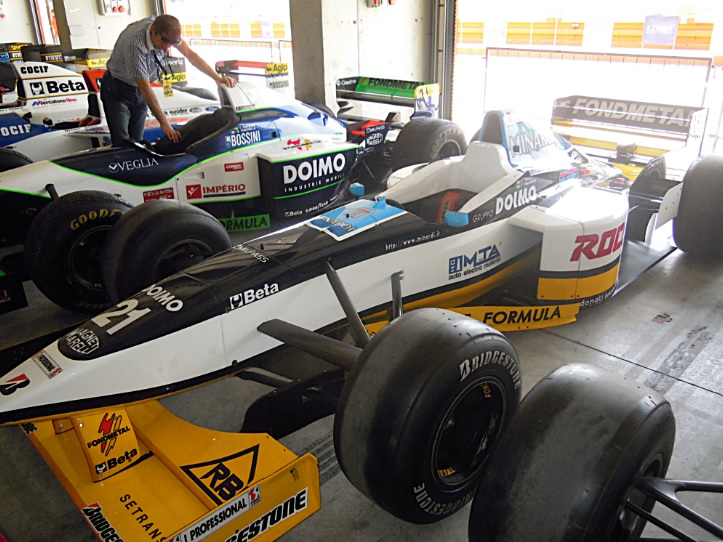
- Category: Formula One
- Constructor: Minardi
- Designers: Gabriele Tredozi (Technical Director); Mauro Gennaro (Chief Designer); Mariano Alperin (Chief Aerodynamicist)
- Predecessor: M195B
- Successor: M198

Technical specifications
- Chassis: carbon-fibre monocoque
- Suspension (front): double wishbones, pushrod
- Suspension (rear): as front
- Engine: Hart 830 3-litre 72° V8 naturally-aspirated mid-engine
- Transmission: Minardi/Xtrac six-speed longitudinal sequential semi-automatic
- Power: 680 hp @ 13,100 rpm
- Fuel: Petroscience
- Tyres: Bridgestone

Competition history
- Notable entrants: Minardi Team
- Notable drivers: 20. (Japan) Ukyo Katayama; 21. (Italy) Jarno Trulli; 21. (Brazil) Tarso Marques
- Debut: 1997 Australian Grand Prix
Races	Wins	Poles	F/Laps
17	0	0	0
- Teams' Championships: 0
- Constructors' Championships: 0
- Drivers' Championships: 0

The Minardi M197 was the car with which the Minardi Formula One team competed in the 1997 Formula One season.

== Development ==
In late 1996, Minardi were acquired by a consortium led by Flavio Briatore including former Minardi driver Alessandro Nannini and Gabriele Rumi of Fondmetal. Giancarlo Minardi retained a minority shareholding of the team that bore his name.

The M197 was developed by Minardi chief engineer Gabriele Tredozi, head of the drawing office Mauro Gennaro, and lead aerodynamicist Mariano Alperin. The M197 was developed heavily at Fondmetal's wind tunnel in Ferrara, Italy. Davide Colombo also joined the aerodynamics team from F3000. Although design and development work had begun in mid-1996, the decision to use Hart V8 engines for 1997 was made late leading to extensive redesign work on the car in preparation for the first Grand Prix.

The M197 was the last Minardi car to utilize V8 naturally-aspirated engine.

== Racing overview ==
Minardi launched the M197 on February 4, 1997. It was confirmed at the unveiling the 1997 drivers would be Ukyo Katayama and rookie Jarno Trulli. Tarso Marques was retained as a test driver At the launch, it was announced a partnership with Mild Seven.

At the first Grand Prix in Australia, both drivers qualified well - ahead of both Tyrrells, both Arrows including that of reigning World Champion Damon Hill and both Lolas. Katayama would ultimately retire from the race, however Trulli finished in 9th. Trulli would go on to complete all of the first three Grand Prix, whilst more experienced team mate Katayama suffered two retirements. Trulli failed to start the San Marino Grand Prix due to a hydraulic failure.

Ahead of the 1997 French Grand Prix, Trulli left Minardi to join Prost Grand Prix and was replaced by Marques. Neither Marques or Katayama would score a point during the remainder of the season. Marques was disqualified from the 1997 Austrian Grand Prix due to a weight infringement.

The team were unclassified in the Constructors' Championship, with no points. They were classified ahead of the Lola team, who withdrew from the championship after the first Grand Prix.

== Test drivers ==
The M197 was utilised by a number of drivers during test sessions. Alongside the three race drivers of Katayama, Trulli and Marques the M197 was tested by Esteban Tuero, Tom Kristensen, Luca Badoer, Laurent Redon and Oliver Martini.

== Livery ==
The M197 featured a return to Minardi's colour scheme of black, yellow and white, used from 1988 to 1992. Fondmetal was one of the major sponsors, along with Mild Seven (brought by Katayama) and Roces.

Minardi used the 'Mild Seven' logos, except at the French, British and German Grands Prix.

== Complete Formula One results ==
(key) (results in bold indicate pole position)

Year	Team	Engine	Tyres	Drivers	1	2	3	4	5	6	7	8	9	10	11	12	13	14	15	16	17	Points	WCC
1997	Minardi	Hart V8	**B**		AUS	BRA	ARG	SMR	MON	ESP	CAN	FRA	GBR	GER	HUN	BEL	ITA	AUT	LUX	JPN	EUR	**0**	**NC**
1997	Minardi	Hart V8	**B**	Jarno Trulli	9	12	9	DNS	Ret	15	Ret											**0**	**NC**
1997	Minardi	Hart V8	**B**	Tarso Marques								Ret	10	Ret	12	Ret	14	EX	Ret	Ret	15	**0**	**NC**
1997	Minardi	Hart V8	**B**	Ukyo Katayama	Ret	18	Ret	11	10	Ret	Ret	11	Ret	Ret	10	14	Ret	11	Ret	Ret	17	**0**	**NC**
