= Gastón Mazzacane =

Argentine racing driver (born 1975)

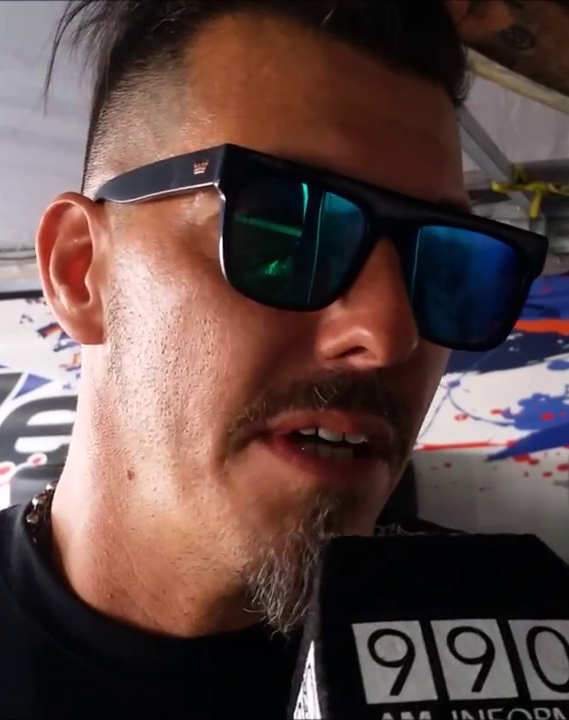
- Mazzacane in 2018
- Born: Gastón Hugo Mazzacane; 8 May 1975 (age 51); La Plata, Buenos Aires, Argentina

Formula One World Championship career
- Nationality: (Argentina) Argentine
- Active years: 2000–2001
- Team(s): Minardi, Prost
- Entries: 21
- Championships: 0
- Wins: 0
- Podiums: 0
- Career points: 0
- Pole positions: 0
- Fastest laps: 0
- First entry: 2000 Australian Grand Prix
- Last entry: 2001 San Marino Grand Prix

Championship titles
- 2018: TC Pick Up

Gastón Hugo Mazzacane (born 8 May 1975) is an Argentine racing driver. He participated in 21 Formula One Grands Prix, debuting in the 2000 Australian Grand Prix. His father, Hugo Mazzacane, named him after the late Argentine touring car racer Gastón Perkins.

Mazzacane has also raced in Turismo Carretera and was the first TC Pick Up champion in 2018.

== Racing career ==
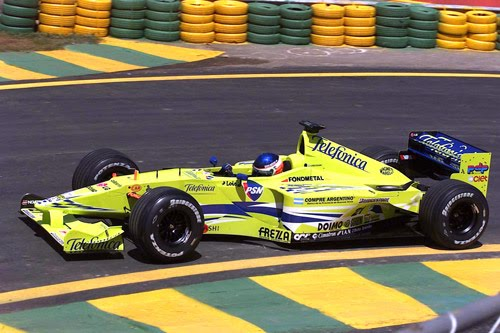
Mazzacane driving for Minardi in 2000

Mazzacane competed in karting as a teenager, and debuted in car racing at the 1992 Club Argentino de Pilotos. In 1993 he was runner-up of the South American Formula Three Class B. The driver moved to Italy in 1994 to claim the Formula 2000 title. In 1995 he stepped up to Italian Formula Three, and also entered the Masters of Formula 3. From 1996 to 1998 he raced at the International Formula 3000, scoring two points in his final season. He also competed at the 1999 SportsRacing World Cup with a Ferrari 333 SP, scoring a win.

The Argentine began his Formula One career in 1999 as the test driver for Minardi. In late February 2000, it was announced that he would be the teammate of Marc Gené in the race team. "I intend to learn over the first half of the season, and then I feel I will have the confidence to perform well," Mazzacane told the press at the launch of the Minardi M02. His debut year in Formula One began with a broken gearbox at his first race, the 2000 Australian Grand Prix, followed by a tenth-place finish in Brazil. He went on to outqualify Gené at Imola, a feat he later accomplished twice more. The German Grand Prix was a relative high point for him; after outqualifying his teammate, he finished 11th. His highlight in the spotlight this season was on a damp Indianapolis track, when he famously overtook Mika Häkkinen, who was struggling after an early gamble on dry tyres. After running up to third without stopping, he ran over his pit crew and dropped out of the race later. Nevertheless, he finished 11 of the 17 races that year and ranked third among drivers with the most kilometres raced.

At the start of 2001, Mazzacane tested for Arrows, but finally settled into the Prost team, taking over the seat of the Sauber-bound Nick Heidfeld. He beat CART's Oriol Servia for the Prost spot, and was announced as the second driver in January 2001. However, the 2001 San Marino Grand Prix was his final Formula One race. Alain Prost fired him by using a performance clause in his contract, and the vacancy was filled by Luciano Burti, who had recently been sacked from Jaguar Racing. Mazzacane was often described as a pay driver.

For the 2002 season, Mazzacane signed a contract with the reformed DART team a/k/a Phoenix, which had bought assets from Prost. He was on track at the second round at Malaysia, but the FIA ruled that it was a new team and the team was barred from the series. He would be the last Argentinian to drive in Formula One until the 2024 Italian Grand Prix when Franco Colapinto drove for Williams.

Mazzacane then went to the United States and competed at ten rounds of the 2004 Champ Car World Series with Dale Coyne Racing, with a best place of sixth at Toronto.

The driver returned to Argentina in 2005, where he competed in Top Race V6 until 2010. In 2008 and 2009 he also ran at the Brazilian Fórmula Truck. Mazzacane has competed at Turismo Carretera since 2009 and TC Pick Up since 2018. He is an executive at the Asociación Corredores de Turismo Carretera since 2013. In 2021 he won his maiden TC race on his 169th start.

== Motorsport career results ==
=== Complete International Formula 3000 results ===
(key) (Races in bold indicate pole position) (Races in italics indicate fastest lap)

Year	Entrant	1	2	3	4	5	6	7	8	9	10	11	12	DC	Points
1996	Auto Sport Racing	NÜR; Ret	PAU; DNQ	PER; 14	HOC; Ret	SIL; 11	SPA; 19	MAG; Ret	EST; 10	MUG; Ret	HOC; Ret			22nd	0
1997	Auto Sport Racing	SIL; 10	PAU; DNQ	HEL; Ret	NÜR; 10	PER; 15	HOC; 10	A1R; 17	SPA; 11	MUG; 10	JER; Ret			28th	0
1998	Team Astromega	OSC; 6	IMO; 7	CAT; Ret	SIL; 6	MON; 12	PAU; 9	A1R; Ret	HOC; Ret	HUN; Ret	SPA; DNQ	PER; 13	NÜR; Ret	21st	2
1999	GP Racing	IMO	MON	CAT	MAG	SIL; DNQ	A1R	HOC	HUN	SPA	NÜR			NC	0

=== Complete Formula One results ===
(key)

Year	Entrant	Chassis	Engine	1	2	3	4	5	6	7	8	9	10	11	12	13	14	15	16	17	WDC	Points
2000	Telefónica Minardi Fondmetal	Minardi M02	Fondmetal V10	AUS; Ret	BRA; 10	SMR; 13	GBR; 15	ESP; 15	EUR; 8	MON; Ret	CAN; 12	FRA; Ret	AUT; 12	GER; 11	HUN; Ret	BEL; 17	ITA; 10	USA; Ret	JPN; 15	MAL; 13^{†}	21st	0
2001	Prost Acer	Prost AP04	Acer V10	AUS; Ret	MAL; 12	BRA; Ret	SMR; Ret	ESP	AUT	MON	CAN	EUR	FRA	GBR	GER	HUN	BEL	ITA	USA	JPN	25th	0

^{†} Did not finish, but was classified as he had completed more than 90% of the race distance.

=== American Open-Wheel ===
(key)

==== Champ Car ====
Year	Team	No.	1	2	3	4	5	6	7	8	9	10	11	12	13	14	Rank	Points	Ref
2004	Dale Coyne	19	LBH	MTY	MIL; 16	POR; 13	CLE; 12	TOR; 6	VAN; 18	ROA; 18	DEN; 15	MTL; 12	LS; 13	LVS; 15	SRF	MXC	**17th**	**73**	
