= Gabriele Tredozi =

Italian motor racing engineer (born 1957)

- Born: 9 September 1957 (age 68); Brisighella, Italy
- Education: University of Bologna
- Occupations: Race engineer Technical director
- Years active: 1988–2006
- Employer(s): Minardi; Scuderia Toro Rosso

Gabriele Tredozi (born 9 September 1957) is a former engineer with the Minardi and Scuderia Toro Rosso Formula One teams.

== Career ==
Tredozi was born in Brisighella on 9 September 1957. While studying mechanical engineering at Bologna University, Tredozi began working for the Minardi Formula One team as an assistant race engineer in 1988 for Pierluigi Martini and Adrián Campos. Tredozi would be Martini's race engineer for five seasons between 1989 and 1991 and again from 1994 to 1995 after Martini returned to Minardi following the dissolvement of Scuderia Italia into the Minardi operation. Tredozi was also race engineer for Christian Fittipaldi, Fabrizio Barbazza, and Pedro Lamy.

In 1995, following the departure of Aldo Costa to Scuderia Ferrari and Rene Hilorst to Sauber, he was appointed as the Minardi's chief engineer, a role where he was responsible for both the design and production areas, as well as for on-track technical management. Tredozi was a key member of the tripartite design team at Minardi alongside Mauro Gennaro and Mariano Alperin responsible for creating the Minardi M197. The following season, Gustav Brunner was appointed Technical Director and Tredozi remained as chief engineer supporting on the design of the M198, M01, and PS01. In 2001, when Brunner moved to the new Toyota team, Tredozi became technical director and controlled the day-to-day operation of the drawing office, as well as the technical staff. Tredozi would hold the position as Technical Director throughout Paul Stoddart's ownership of Minardi. After the team was sold to Red Bull GmbH and rebranded as Scuderia Toro Rosso, Tredozi remained with the team until September 2006 when he was replaced by Alex Hitzinger.

In 2008, Tredozi joined Sky Sport Italia's Formula One punditry team alongside the likes of Marc Gene, Tamara Ecclestone, and Gabriele Tarquini. In the same year, Treodzi was appointed as Technical Director of Scuderia Playteam for their campaign in Superleague Formula. After the team withdrew from competition in 2009, Tredozi joined Dallara to support work on the new Campos Meta F1 car, which would later become the Hispania F110 ahead of their entry to Formula One in 2010.

== Personal life ==
Tredozi is married to Claudia. Together, they has one son, Tommaso. His main hobby is cycling.
