= 2000 Monaco Grand Prix =

Formula One motor race held in 2000

Coordinates: 43°44′4.74″N 7°25′16.8″E

Race 7 of 17 in the 2000 Formula One World Championship
← Previous race	Next race →

Race details
- Date: 4 June 2000
- Official name: Grand Prix de Monaco 2000
- Location: Circuit de Monaco, La Condamine and Monte Carlo, Monaco
- Course: Street circuit
- Course length: 3.370 km (2.094 miles)
- Distance: 78 laps, 262.860 km (163.334 miles)
- Weather: Sunny

Pole position
Driver	(Germany) Michael Schumacher	Ferrari
- Time: 1:19.475

Fastest lap
Driver	(Finland) Mika Häkkinen	McLaren-Mercedes
- Time: 1:21.571 on lap 57

Podium
First	(United Kingdom) David Coulthard	McLaren-Mercedes
Second	(Brazil) Rubens Barrichello	Ferrari
Third	(Italy) Giancarlo Fisichella	Benetton-Playlife

The 2000 Monaco Grand Prix (formally the Grand Prix de Monaco 2000) was a Formula One motor race held on 4 June 2000 at the Circuit de Monaco in Monaco. It was the seventh round of the 2000 Formula One World Championship and the 58th Monaco Grand Prix. McLaren driver David Coulthard won the 78-lap race starting from third position. Rubens Barrichello finished second for the Ferrari team with Benetton's Giancarlo Fisichella third.

World Drivers' Championship leader Michael Schumacher driving for World Constructors' Championship leaders Ferrari started from pole position alongside Jordan driver Jarno Trulli after recording the quickest lap time in the previous day's one-hour qualifying session. The race was stopped due to race director Charlie Whiting accidentally hitting the red flag button instead of the pit exit open button and a subsequent collision between Jenson Button and Pedro de la Rosa that created a traffic jam. Michael Schumacher led into the first corner of the second start. After the second round of pit stops, Michael Schumacher's exhaust pipe failed, resulting in a left rear suspension failure and his retirement from the race. On lap 56, Coulthard, who was running in second place, took the lead. Coulthard led the remainder of the race to achieve his second win of the season and ninth in Formula One, with Barrichello a further 15.8 seconds back.

Coulthard's victory cut Michael Schumacher's lead in the World Drivers' Championship to 12 championship points. Häkkinen maintained third place, with Barrichello trailing by seven championship points. In the World Constructors' Championship, Ferrari's lead over McLaren was reduced to five championship points. Fisichella's third-place result reduced the gap to third-placed Williams to a single championship point, with ten races of the season remaining.

== Background ==
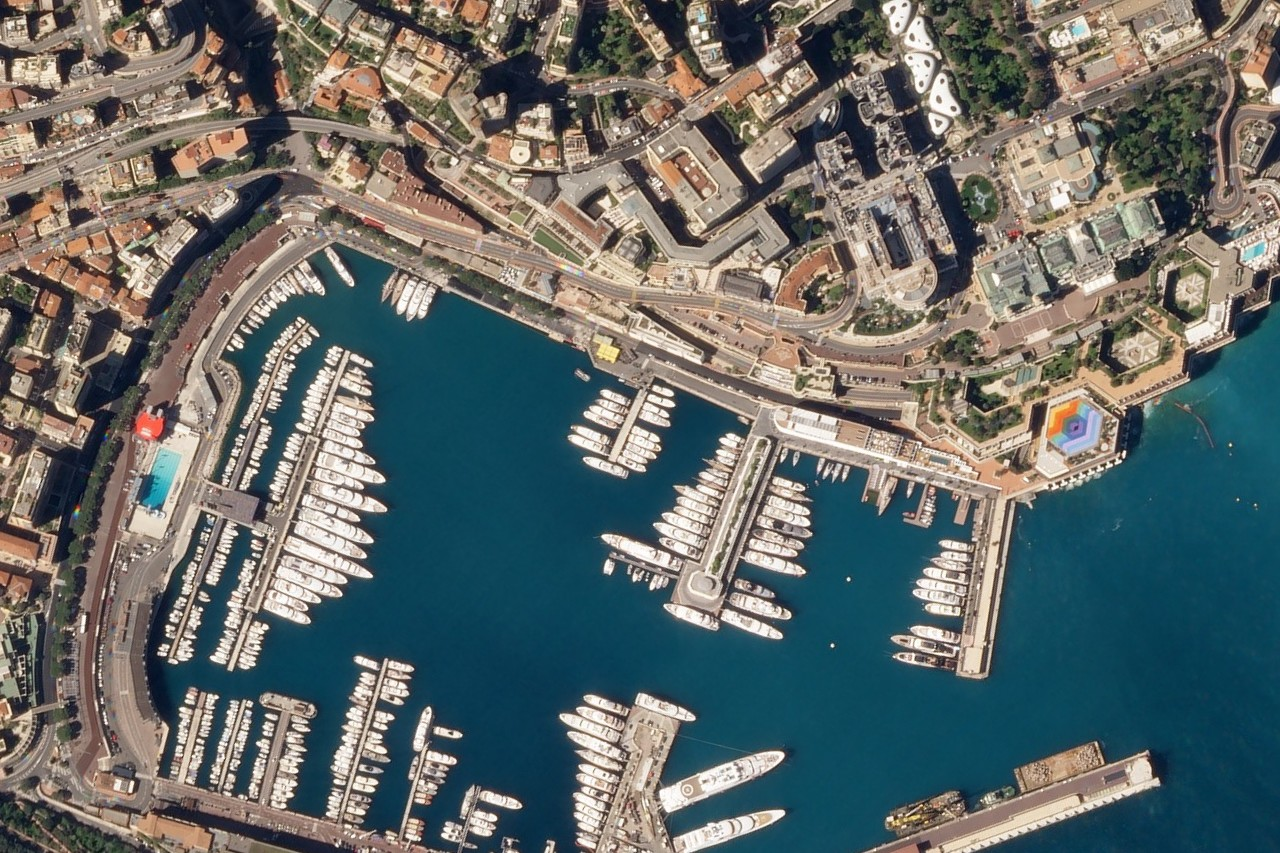
The Circuit de Monaco (pictured in 2018), where the race was held

The 2000 Monaco Grand Prix was the seventh of seventeen rounds in the 2000 Formula One World Championship, taking place on 4 June 2000, at the 3.370 km (2.094 mi) (2.094 mi) clockwise Circuit de Monaco in Monaco on the French Riviera. It was the 58th edition of the Monaco Grand Prix since the race was first held in 1929, and included eleven teams (each representing a different constructor), each with two racing drivers. Control tyre supplier Bridgestone brought the soft and extra soft dry tyre compounds to the race.

Ferrari's Michael Schumacher led the World Drivers' Championship with 46 championship points entering the race, followed by McLaren's Mika Häkkinen on 28 championship points and his teammate David Coulthard on 24 championship points. Ferrari's Rubens Barrichello was fourth with 16 championship points, and Williams' Ralf Schumacher was fifth with 12 championship points. Ferrari led the World Constructors' Championship with 62 championship points, ten ahead of McLaren. Williams were third with 15 championship points, Benetton fourth with 10 championship points and Jordan fifth with 9 championship points.

Following the European Grand Prix on 21 May all teams tested across European circuits between 23 and 27 May to prepare for the Grand Prix. Jordan, Sauber, Benetton, Jaguar and Arrows tested at the Circuit Ricardo Tormo circuit which made its Formula One testing début, garnering mixed reviews from the drivers. Jordan's Heinz-Harald Frentzen led the first day of testing, from Sauber test driver Enrique Bernoldi. Arrows' Jos Verstappen set the second day's quickest times. Late in the session, Fisichella collided with Jordan driver Jarno Trulli's right-rear tyre, flipping his Benetton and temporarily stopping testing. Fisichella experienced mild thumb bruising, and Benetton withdrew second driver Alexander Wurz from testing. Sauber's Mika Salo led the final day's running. Williams and British American Racing (BAR) travelled to the Circuit Paul Armagnac circuit to conduct shakedown runs and test car setups. BAR tested a new control system named "Athena 2000," which managed the software of the engine and several chassis parts. Ferrari spent five days testing at their private test facility, the Fiorano Circuit, where test driver Luca Badoer and Michael Schumacher concentrated on aerodynamic and tyre testing, as well as testing different set-ups and driving on an artificially wet circuit.

Because of the Circuit de Monaco's configuration, with its low average speed and quantity of low-speed corners, combined with the low-grip nature of the public road surface, the teams all set their cars up to produce the maximum amount of downforce and mechanical grip possible. Benetton modified the suspensions on the B200 car to work better on the circuit's low-speed corners. The Minardi vehicles were outfitted with a new titanium cast gearbox and rear springs. McLaren sent an additional spare car to the event, giving Häkkinen and Coulthard a total of four. The team also shipped in six extra monocoques for the race. Jordan debuted an improved version of its Mugen-Honda V10 engine in the Grand Prix, while Jaguar added a reworked engine hood and a new front wing to its two cars. The Williams team installed an extra fin on the engine hood, two minor fins on the sides, and new front and back wings to their car.

== Practice ==
Before the race on Sunday, there were two one-hour sessions on Thursday and two 45-minute sessions on Saturday. The practice sessions on Thursday morning and afternoon were held in hot, dry weather. Michael Schumacher set the first session's fastest time, 1:23.039, faster than Häkkinen by three-tenths of a second. Coulthard was third, behind Fisichella and Frentzen. Despite gearbox troubles that prompted him to pull up on the track, Alesi was sixth. Jaguar's Eddie Irvine, Williams' Jenson Button, Barrichello and Salo made up positions seven to ten. Ralf Schumacher collided with the barrier near the tunnel's entrance, necessitating pit lane repairs. Minardi's Gastón Mazzacane spun and lost his front right wheel in an accident at La Rascasse turn.

Häkkinen recorded the day's fastest lap in the second practice session, a 1:21.387; Coulthard finished third. Michael Schumacher separated the McLaren drivers. Eddie Irvine lapped faster and was fourth, ahead of Frentzen and Ralf Schumacher. Alesi, seventh, continued to struggle. Arrows' Pedro de la Rosa, Trulli and Barrichello completed the top ten. Wurz's car collided at the Swimming Pool complex, breaking his front wing and removing one of his wheels. Nick Heidfeld lost control of his Prost car and damaged its right-hand side against the barrier at La Rascasse corner. Pedro Diniz's Sauber car collided with the barrier at the same turn, dropping a considerable amount of oil that marshals attempted to clean up.

After taking Friday off – a race-exclusive feature – (Note: The Friday of the Monaco Grand Prix was designated as a rest day as the event was traditionally linked to Ascension Day and the roads could re-open for the day.) for leisure time, sponsor functions and for teams to prepare their cars for the second day of practice, the weather remained hot and dry for the Saturday morning practice sessions. Track evolution was observed during the third session. Michael Schumacher set the third session's quickest lap, 1:20.762; Barrichello was third. Häkkinen was second fastest, one-tenth of a second slower than Michael Schumacher. Alesi kept improving and was fourth, faster than Coulthard, Frentzen, Irvine, Trulli, Fisichella and Sauber's Johnny Herbert. Frentzen and Wurz went off the circuit during the session but avoided damaging their vehicles.

On Saturday morning before practice, Alex Ribeiro crashed into the railings of the medical car at Tabac. He was unhurt, but FIA medical representative Sid Watkins suffered three broken ribs. Coulthard led the final practice session with a lap of 1:20.405, 0.142 seconds quicker than teammate Häkkinen's 1999 pole lap; he stalled the engine after running down the escape road at Ste Devote to avoid a collision with the guardrail barrier. Slower cars prevented Coulthard from lapping faster. Michael Schumacher was nearly a tenth slower in second. Fisichella chose a softer damper and was third fastest. Trulli, Häkkinen, Barrichello, Alesi, Wurz, Frentzen, and Ralf Schumacher filled positions four through 10. Irvine crashed at the swimming pool complex, ending his session early.

== Qualifying ==
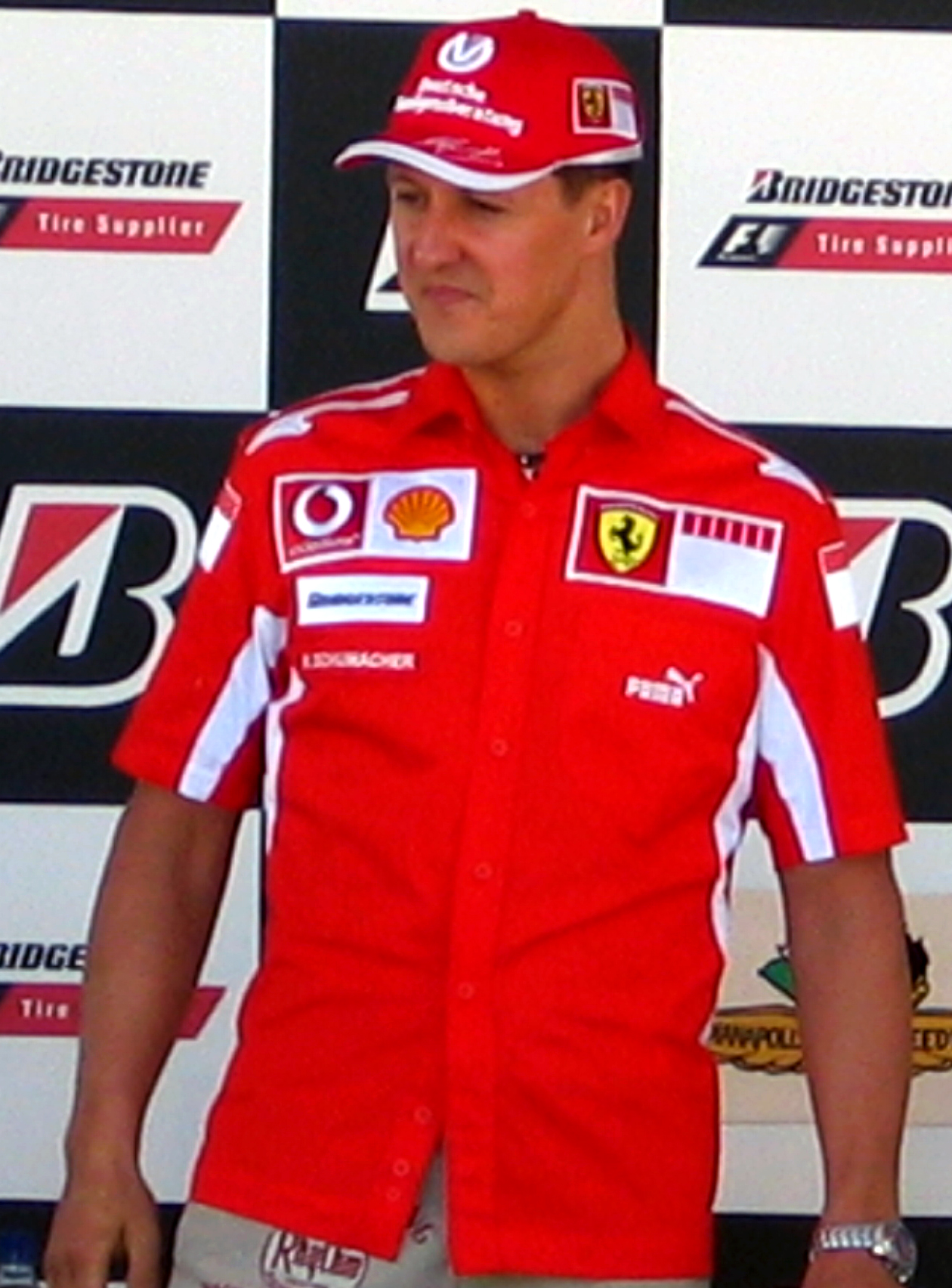
Michael Schumacher (pictured in 2005) clinched his second pole position of the 2000 season.

During Saturday's one-hour qualifying session, each driver was allowed twelve laps, with the grid order determined by the quickest laps. The 107% rule was in force during this session, which required each driver to lap within 107% of the fastest lap to qualify for the race. The session took place in hot, dry weather. Michael Schumacher took his second pole position of the season and the 25th of his career with a time of 1:19.475 with seven minutes left; he struck the metal guardrail at Portier corner entering the tunnel with his rear-left wheel but continued. Trulli, who was 0.271 seconds slower and had his best qualifying performance of the season on soft tyres and made car adjustments for better handling, joined him on the grid's front row. Coulthard qualified third and said he could have lapped quicker as he saw a yellow flag out on the track. Trulli's teammate Frentzen qualified fourth but criticised Irvine for an apparent blocking manoeuvre in the tunnel. Häkkinen took fifth in his worst qualifying result of 2000, with understeer on his second qualifying run and slower traffic on all four. Barrichello took sixth despite driving a nervous car, five places behind his teammate Michael Schumacher. Alesi, seventh, had alternator problems in his race car early in qualifying and switched to the spare Prost car.

Fisichella qualified eighth and noticed a severe deterioration in his handling. Ralf Schumacher and Irvine rounded out the top ten; Ralf Schumacher reported excessive understeer and that his best lap was affected by Irvine, who suffered a power steering failure on his fastest lap. Herbert qualified eleventh, five hundredths slower than his teammate, and reported excessive oversteer. He was ahead of Wurz in the slower Benetton car in 12th. Despite a misunderstanding with his race engineer over a yellow flag, Salo qualified 13th. Similarly, Button, who took 14th in the other Williams, was caught out by the waved yellow flags. Understeer, traction, and brake issues slowed Button. The two Arrows drivers were Verstappen (15th) and De la Rosa (16th); the latter crashed at the Rascasse chicane. BAR's Jacques Villeneuve started from 17th after an engine failure into Lowes corner led him to stop at the furthest place from the pit lane and lay oil on the circuit. Villeneuve had to drive the spare BAR car for the rest of qualifying. Heidfeld (18th) experienced a lack of grip and understeer. He qualified ahead of Diniz and BAR's Ricardo Zonta, who were 19th and 20th, respectively. Marc Gené and Mazzacane of Minardi qualified 21st and 22nd, respectively, but both crashed at Rascasse turn.

=== Qualifying classification ===
Pos	No	Driver	Constructor	Lap	Gap
1	3	(Germany) Michael Schumacher	Ferrari	1:19.475	—
2	6	(Italy) Jarno Trulli	Jordan-Mugen-Honda	1:19.746	+0.271
3	2	(United Kingdom) David Coulthard	McLaren-Mercedes	1:19.888	+0.413
4	5	(Germany) Heinz-Harald Frentzen	Jordan-Mugen-Honda	1:19.961	+0.486
5	1	(Finland) Mika Häkkinen	McLaren-Mercedes	1:20.241	+0.766
6	4	(Brazil) Rubens Barrichello	Ferrari	1:20.416	+0.941
7	14	(France) Jean Alesi	Prost-Peugeot	1:20.494	+1.019
8	11	(Italy) Giancarlo Fisichella	Benetton-Playlife	1:20.703	+1.228
9	9	(Germany) Ralf Schumacher	Williams-BMW	1:20.742	+1.267
10	7	(United Kingdom) Eddie Irvine	Jaguar-Cosworth	1:20.743	+1.268
11	8	(United Kingdom) Johnny Herbert	Jaguar-Cosworth	1:20.792	+1.317
12	12	(Austria) Alexander Wurz	Benetton-Playlife	1:20.871	+1.396
13	17	(Finland) Mika Salo	Sauber-Petronas	1:21.561	+2.086
14	10	(United Kingdom) Jenson Button	Williams-BMW	1:21.605	+2.130
15	19	(Netherlands) Jos Verstappen	Arrows-Supertec	1:21.738	+2.263
16	18	(Spain) Pedro de la Rosa	Arrows-Supertec	1:21.832	+2.357
17	22	(Canada) Jacques Villeneuve	BAR-Honda	1:21.848	+2.373
18	15	(Germany) Nick Heidfeld	Prost-Peugeot	1:22.017	+2.542
19	16	(Brazil) Pedro Diniz	Sauber-Petronas	1:22.136	+2.661
20	23	(Brazil) Ricardo Zonta	BAR-Honda	1:22.324	+2.849
21	20	(Spain) Marc Gené	Minardi-Fondmetal	1:23.721	+4.246
22	21	(Argentina) Gastón Mazzacane	Minardi-Fondmetal	1:23.794	+4.319
107% time: 1:25.038

== Warm-up ==
The drivers took part in a 30-minute warm-up session in dry, warm weather at 09:30 Central European Summer Time (UTC+2). Barrichello set the fastest time of 1:22.251, with Ferrari teammate Michael Schumacher second. Ralf Schumacher was third fastest with Coulthard fourth. The session was disrupted when De la Rosa lost traction in his car and struck the barriers leaving Tabac turn just before the session concluded – warm-up was ended early as marshals needed to clear the track – reducing Arrows' available race vehicles to two. After spinning on oil on the track, Herbert clipped the tyre barrier at Piscine turn in the Swimming Pool complex, forcing him to drive the spare Jaguar in the race.

== Race ==
The race commenced at 14:30 local time, running for 78 laps over a distance of 262.860 km (163.334 mi). The weather was warm and cloudless for the race; the air temperature was 24 °C (75 °F) and the track temperature was 42 °C (108 °F). Michael Schumacher, Barrichello, Häkkinen, Coulthard, Button and Mazzacane began on the soft tyre compound. Bridgestone advised drivers using the soft compound tyre to begin on new sets and those on the supersoft compound to use scrubbed tyres. The course at Sainte Devote corner had become slick owing to a two-car accident during the morning Renault Clio Cup undercard round, which saw fluids from the smashed vehicles flow onto the track, necessitating marshals to apply cement mortar in an unsuccessful attempt to dry the oil puddles. This meant a driver braking wide would lose traction on the asphalt.

Diniz was unable to launch at the start of the parade lap, forcing him to start at the back of the grid. Wurz's engine failed during the starting procedure, and race officials aborted the start to allow his car to be removed. The mechanics returned to the grid with their equipment. After Wurz's engine failure, Diniz was allowed to start from his qualifying position as Wurz drove Fisichella's spare car. The race began eight minutes late; Michael Schumacher maintained the lead into the first corner. Behind him, Trulli remained in second position. The race was suspended due to race director Charlie Whiting accidentally hitting the red flag button instead of the pit exit open button. However marshals did not wave red flags to signal a race stoppage across the circuit, except at the start/finish line. De la Rosa attempted to overtake Button on the outside at the Loews hairpin, but Button's front-right wheel collided with one of De la Rosa's rear wheels, sending De la Rosa into a spin. This caused a traffic jam for six cars behind the two drivers. No one was hurt. All the cars that stopped on the circuit were abandoned. Realising they could drive their spare cars under the sporting regulations for race stoppages if fewer than two laps had been completed, Button, Zonta, Heidfeld, Diniz, and Gené restarted in their team's spare cars and had to start from the pit lane. De la Rosa, conversely, did not have a spare car available and was unable to restart.

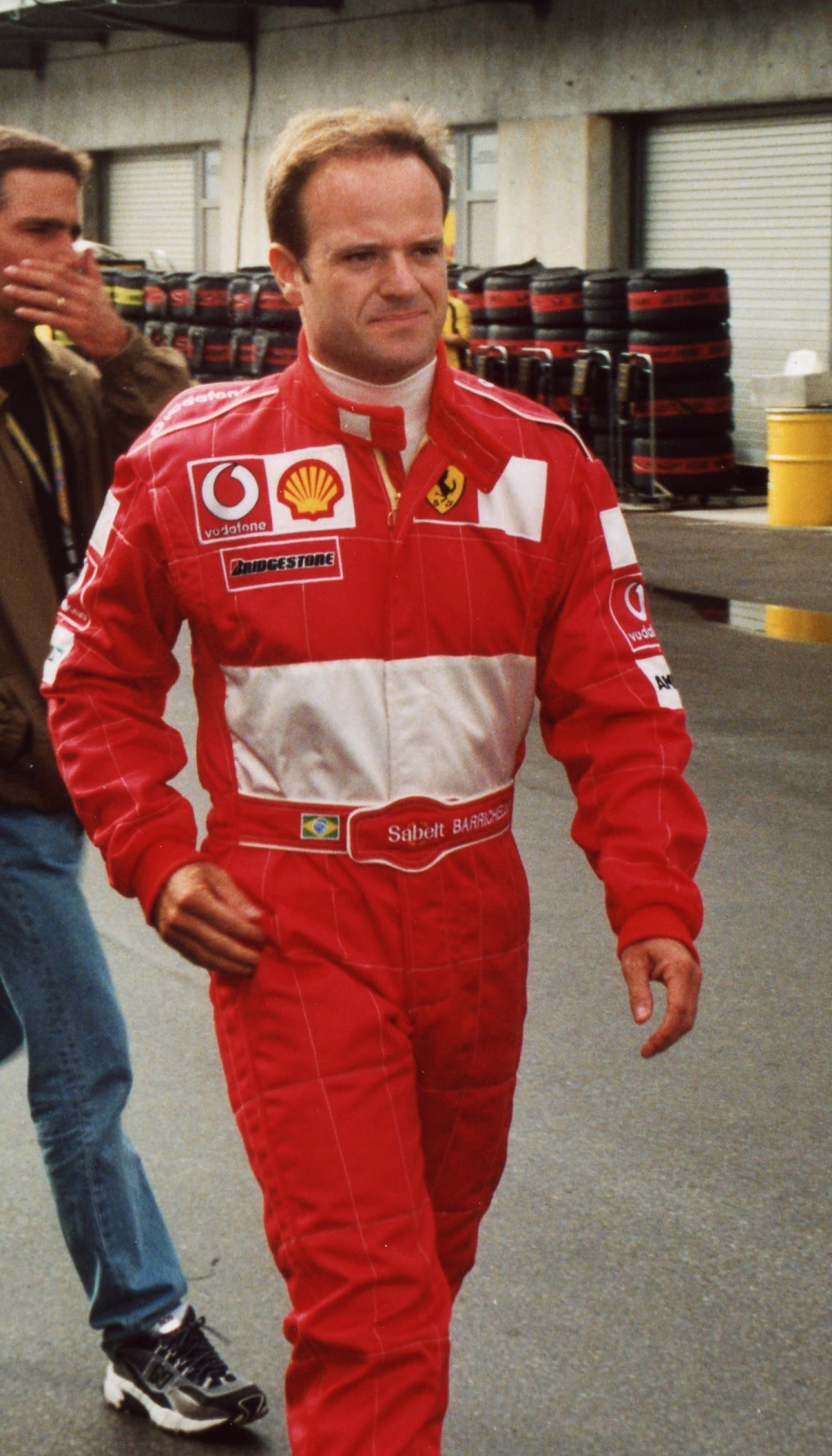
Rubens Barrichello (pictured in 2002) finished second.

Michael Schumacher and Trulli maintained their positions during the restart at 14:31 local time, while Ralf Schumacher made the best start, moving from ninth to sixth by the end of the first lap while Barrichello lost two places. The order at the conclusion of the first lap was Michael Schumacher, Trulli, Coulthard, Frentzen, Häkkinen and Ralf Schumacher. Michael Schumacher began to pull away from Trulli immediately, setting consecutive fastest laps. Häkkinen began to challenge Frentzen for fourth on lap two. Michael Schumacher led Trulli by more than 11 seconds by the 11th lap, while Wurz overtook Mazzacane for 17th. Button entered the pit lane after telemetry indicated that his engine was losing oil pressure and he retired on lap 17.

By lap 19, Michael Schumacher had extended his lead over Trulli to 19.5 seconds. Trulli was 0.7 seconds ahead of Coulthard. Frentzen was 2.1 seconds behind than Coulthard and was battling for sixth with the latter's teammate Häkkinen. On the same lap Irvine overtook his teammate Herbert for tenth. Wurz lost control of his car and crashed into the barriers at Sainte Devote corner, causing his retirement from the race. On lap 22, Gené retired on an escape road at Casino Square corner due to gearbox failure. His teammate Mazzacane collided with the barriers at Sainte Devote turn on the following lap and retired from the event with a damaged wheel. Herbert was the first driver to make a pit stop on lap 27, but his pit team was unprepared, and he was stationary for 30 seconds before exiting in 17th. Diniz crashed into the tyre barriers at Sainte Devote corner on the 31st lap, retiring with left rear wheel damage. Diniz's car was relocated behind the barriers by marshals, avoiding the use of the safety car.

Häkkinen slowed on lap 36 owing to a brake pedal blockage caused by a loose sensor and made an unscheduled pit stop. His mechanics unlocked his car's inspection hatch and rearranged radio cables. They cleared the blockage by removing a loose data transmitter and Häkkinen rejoined in ninth. Trulli retired in the garage on the next lap due to gearbox failure. Ralf Schumacher, fourth, took evasive action, went off the racing line and struck the right-hand Sainte Devote tyre wall on the 38th lap, as the suspension arm penetrated the monocoque. He suffered a deep cut to his leg and was taken to hospital. Michael Schumacher held a 36-second lead over Coulthard by lap 38; Coulthard lapped frequently in the low 1:22 range to close up. Verstappen made the first scheduled pit stop on lap 41, five laps in front of Zonta and Heidfeld. Michael Schumacher made a pit stop at the end of lap 49 for a set of scrubbed tyres and 29 laps worth of fuel. He retained the lead with an 11.1 second advantage over Coulthard. Fisichella made a pit stop earlier than expected on lap 51 due to a slow puncture. Frentzen, Barrichello, Salo, and Villeneuve made pit stops over the following three laps.

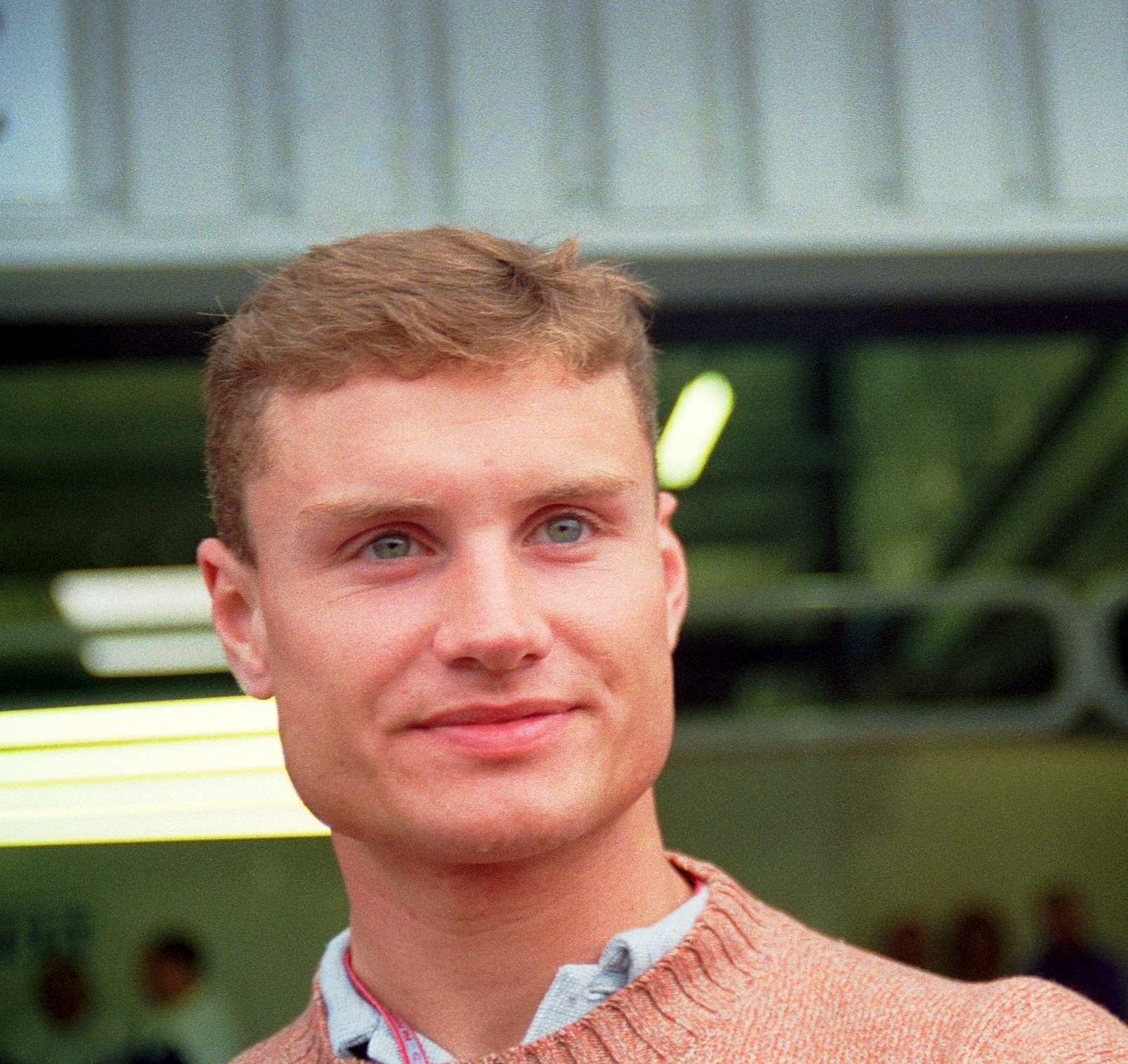
David Coulthard (pictured in 1995) won his second race of the season at Monaco.

Because Villeneuve slowed Coulthard, the gap between Michael Schumacher and Coulthard did not close significantly until laps 53 and 54. Michael Schumacher's car suffered a cracked exhaust pipe that leaked gases under the fairing, breaking a lower left-rear suspension mounting arm since the carbon fiber suspension overheated while Schumacher was driving on the track's centre after exiting Anthony Noughes corner on the 55th lap. This lifted Schumacher's car front-right off the asphalt, causing him to slow to a near stop. As he was past the pit lane entry, he had to complete a full slow lap of the circuit. Ferrari technical director Ross Brawn retired Michael Schumacher in the pit lane for the first time in the season after mechanics failed to replace the broken arm. Coulthard became the new race leader and made his final pit stop on lap 56. At the completion of lap 57, with the scheduled pit stops completed, the order was Coulthard, Frentzen, Barrichello, Fisichella, Irvine, and Salo.

On the same lap, Häkkinen set the race's fastest lap, a 1:21.571, closing up to Salo in seventh. Verstappen, holding off Heidfeld for ninth, spun 360 degrees into a concrete barrier at the Swimming Pool complex on lap 62 and retired. Verstappen was unhurt. On the 71st lap, Frentzen, who lost concentration looking at the leader board, became the race's final retirement when his rear suspension broke in an accident with the wall at the Sainte Devote turn. The accident promoted Barrichello to second and Fisichella to third. Häkkinen started to slow on lap 74. ending his battle with Salo but remained ahead of Villeneuve in seventh. Coulthard slightly slowed after Frentzen's retirement, winning his second race of the season and eighth of his career in a time of 1:49:28.213, at an average speed of 144.072 km/h (89.522 mph). Coulthard was the first British Monaco Grand Prix winner since Jackie Stewart in 1973. Barrichello followed 15.8 seconds later in second, ahead of Fisichella in third, who was gaining on Barrichello in the final laps. Irvine finished fourth and earned Jaguar's first Formula One points. Salo finished fifth, with Häkkinen rounding out the top six points scorers after being held off by Salo. Following Villeneuve, Heidfeld, and Herbert, Frentzen was the final classified finisher despite his accident. Just ten of the 22 qualifiers were classified finishers; nine of them had completed the race. Of the other retirements, Alesi suffered transmission trouble in the tunnel after completing 29 laps and Zonta crashed into the Sainte Devote tyre barrier on lap 48 after entering the corner too quickly.

== Post-race ==
The top three drivers appeared in Prince Rainier III of Monaco's Royal box to collect their trophies and at the press conference that followed. Coulthard, who had administered painkillers to relieve the pain in his ribs suffered in a plane crash a month earlier, was overjoyed to win the race, which he regarded one of his career goals due to the challenges the drivers face on the circuit. He also stated that he wanted to avoid needless repairs to his car by waiting until the pit stops to pass Michael Schumacher and Trulli. Barrichello revealed that he was conserving tyres and fuel and that Brawn had advised him to slow due to an issue. Fisichella said that he was pleased to finish third. He also revealed that he wanted to remain at Benetton for the 2001 season following this result.

Irvine described the Grand Prix as one of the most difficult of his Formula One career, owing to a malfunctioning drink bottle and a blistering foot. He also said that the team's issues were not fully rectified and it would take "six months or so to solve... hopefully we can do it quicker." Salo said that his hands were bruised during the race because his car lacked power steering. Nevertheless, he was happy to finish fifth, saying, "I knew that he would find it very tough to overtake here but I made extra sure I didn't leave the slightest gap or make any mistakes. An enjoyable race for me and for the team, who really deserved this result." Michael Schumacher admitted to feeling disappointed after the race, having led most of it until his lap 56 retirement, saying: "The exhaust was too hot and that was why the rest went wrong. It basically cooked the suspension. I felt a few laps before that something was wrong but there was nothing I could do about it."

Ralf Schumacher suffered a 3 in (76 mm) gash on his left calf. He was taken to Princess Grace Hospital for a routine check-up and his cut was stitched. Ralf Schumacher was later cleared to race in the next Grand Prix, two weeks later. He said he had no prior knowledge of the source of his injuries. Williams had their test driver Bruno Junqueira to fill in for Ralf Schumacher should the need arise. Frentzen admitted fault for the accident that cost him second place, and apologised to team owner Eddie Jordan. His teammate Trulli expressed disappointment over the gearbox failure, since he had thought he would have won the Grand Prix following Michael Schumacher's retirement.

As a result of the race, Michael Schumacher retained the World Drivers' Championship lead, albeit by ten championship points to twelve. Coulthard's victory and Michael Schumacher's retirement along with teammate Häkkinen not scoring put him in second with 34 championship points. He was ahead of teammate Häkkinen, who had 29 championship points. With 22 and 14 championship points, respectively, Barrichello and Fisichella remained fourth and fifth. McLaren reduced Ferrari's lead in the World Constructors' Championship to five championship points. Benetton, in fourth place, narrowed the points gap to Williams, who was third, to one championship point. Jordan remained fifth on nine championship points with ten races remaining in the season.

=== Race classification ===
Drivers who scored championship points are denoted in bold.

Pos	No	Driver	Constructor	Laps	Time/Retired	Grid	Points
1	2	(United Kingdom) **David Coulthard**	**McLaren-Mercedes**	78	1:49:28.213	3	10
2	4	(Brazil) **Rubens Barrichello**	**Ferrari**	78	+15.889	6	6
3	11	(Italy) **Giancarlo Fisichella**	**Benetton-Playlife**	78	+18.522	8	4
4	7	(United Kingdom) **Eddie Irvine**	**Jaguar-Cosworth**	78	+1:05.924	10	3
5	17	(Finland) **Mika Salo**	**Sauber-Petronas**	78	+1:20.775	13	2
6	1	(Finland) **Mika Häkkinen**	**McLaren-Mercedes**	77	+1 Lap	5	1
7	22	(Canada) Jacques Villeneuve	BAR-Honda	77	+1 Lap	17	
8	15	(Germany) Nick Heidfeld	Prost-Peugeot	77	+1 Lap	18	
9	8	(United Kingdom) Johnny Herbert	Jaguar-Cosworth	76	+2 Laps	11	
10	5	(Germany) Heinz-Harald Frentzen	Jordan-Mugen-Honda	70	Accident Damage	4	
Ret	19	(Netherlands) Jos Verstappen	Arrows-Supertec	60	Spun off	15	
Ret	3	(Germany) Michael Schumacher	Ferrari	55	Exhaust/Suspension	1	
Ret	23	(Brazil) Ricardo Zonta	BAR-Honda	48	Spun off	20	
Ret	9	(Germany) Ralf Schumacher	Williams-BMW	37	Accident	9	
Ret	6	(Italy) Jarno Trulli	Jordan-Mugen-Honda	36	Gearbox	2	
Ret	16	(Brazil) Pedro Diniz	Sauber-Petronas	30	Tyre	19	
Ret	14	(France) Jean Alesi	Prost-Peugeot	29	Transmission	7	
Ret	21	(Argentina) Gastón Mazzacane	Minardi-Fondmetal	22	Accident	22	
Ret	20	(Spain) Marc Gené	Minardi-Fondmetal	21	Gearbox	21	
Ret	12	(Austria) Alexander Wurz	Benetton-Playlife	18	Accident	12	
Ret	10	(United Kingdom) Jenson Button	Williams-BMW	16	Engine	14	
DNS	18	(Spain) Pedro de la Rosa	Arrows-Supertec	0	Collision (Note: De la Rosa is listed as Did Not Start in the official results, despite having taken the first start prior to the race being stopped. Regulations at the time were such that in the event of a stoppage being ordered on the first lap, that start would be deemed null-and-void, and the second start would take place as if the first had never occurred. As this driver did not make the second start, he is classified DNS.)^{1}	16	

Notes:

- **^1** — Pedro de la Rosa is listed as Did Not Start even though he took part in the original start.

== Championship standings after the race ==
Drivers' Championship standings

+/–	Pos	Driver	Points
	1	(Germany) Michael Schumacher	46
1	2	(United Kingdom) David Coulthard	34
1	3	(Finland) Mika Häkkinen	29
	4	(Brazil) Rubens Barrichello	22
1	5	(Italy) Giancarlo Fisichella	14

Constructors' Championship standings

+/–	Pos	Constructor	Points
	1	(Italy) Ferrari	68
	2	(United Kingdom) McLaren-Mercedes	63
	3	(United Kingdom) Williams-BMW	15
	4	(Italy) Benetton-Playlife	14
	5	(Republic of Ireland) Jordan-Mugen-Honda	9
Sources:

- Note: Only the top five positions are included for both sets of standings.

== Notes ==
Previous race: 2000 European Grand Prix	FIA Formula One World Championship; 2000 season	Next race: 2000 Canadian Grand Prix
Previous race: 1999 Monaco Grand Prix	Monaco Grand Prix	Next race: 2001 Monaco Grand Prix
