= Minardi M198 =

Formula One racing car

- Minardi M198 of Shinji Nakano showcased at the 2025 Italian Grand Prix
- Category: Formula One
- Constructor: Minardi
- Designers: Gustav Brunner (Technical Director); Gabriele Tredozi (Chief Engineer); Mariano Alperin (Chief Aerodynamicist)
- Predecessor: M197
- Successor: M01

Technical specifications
- Chassis: carbon-fibre and honeycomb composite structure
- Suspension (front): double wishbones, pushrod with coaxial spring/damper and torsion bar
- Suspension (rear): double wishbones, pushrod with coaxial spring/damper and torsion bar
- Engine: Ford JD Zetec-R, 3.0-litre, 72-degree V10, mid-engined
- Transmission: Minardi six-speed longitudinal sequential semi-automatic
- Power: 710 PS (522 kW; 700 bhp) @ 15,000 rpm 450 N⋅m (332 lb⋅ft)
- Weight: 500 kilograms (1,100 lb)
- Fuel: Elf or Texaco
- Tyres: Bridgestone

Competition history
- Notable entrants: Fondmetal Minardi Team
- Notable drivers: 22. (Japan) Shinji Nakano; 23. (Argentina) Esteban Tuero
- Debut: 1998 Australian Grand Prix
| Races | Wins | Poles | F/Laps |
|---|---|---|---|
| 16 | 0 | 0 | 0 |
- Constructors' Championships: 0
- Drivers' Championships: 0

The Minardi M198 was the car with which the Minardi team competed in the 1998 Formula One World Championship.

This was the final Minardi car to use the "M1xx" suffix designation.

== Overview ==
For 1998, Minardi signed Japanese Shinji Nakano from Prost, and Argentine rookie Esteban Tuero.

The M198 featured a Ford powered Cosworth V10 engine, upgrading from the previous seasons Hart V8. Tuero first tested the new engine in January 1998 at Mugello. By February, Nakano had joined the team and was testing the car in Barcelona. However, despite optimism, Tuero had yet to be granted a super licence to compete in the 1998 season. Tuero was eventually awarded his license by the FIA and upon starting the season at 19 years of age, he became the third-youngest ever Formula One driver at the time.

At the first round of the 1998 season in Australia, Tuero managed to qualify in 17th position ahead of 1996 Monaco Grand Prix winner Olivier Panis, and both Tyrrells. However, ultimately the race would finish in a double retirement for the M198 - a feat repeated at the next round in Brazil. Nakano took the M198 to its first Grand Prix finish in Argentina.

Reliability was an issue with the M198, as were a number of accidents. The car failed to finish 18 times. Tuero only finished four Grand Prix he entered, a 75% retirement rate. Nakano suffered six retirements, meaning three Grand Prix where neither M198 passed the chequered flag. At the final race of the season in Japan, Tuero was involved in a collision with Tora Takagi which caused lesions across three spinal vertebrae. The debris from the accident was hit by Michael Schumacher, leading him to retire and Mika Hakkinen won the title.

The highlight of the M198 was Nakano's 7th place finish at the 1998 Canadian Grand Prix. This led Minardi to finish ahead of Tyrrell in the 1998 Constructors' Championship, despite both teams failing to score any points.

Following the season, Minardi began utilising the M198 for testing ahead of 1999. Laurent Redon, Marc Gene and Italian F3 winner Donny Crevels all tested the M198 at Barcelona in December, 1998. Gene would ultimately join the team for 1999, and drive the M01.

== Livery ==
The M198 had a significant livery change from its predecessor, running a new silver and blue paintjob. The car also featured a large number of sponsors, such as Fondmetal, Roces, Avex Group and Doimo.

== Complete Formula One results ==
(key) (results in bold indicate pole position)

| Year | Team | Engine | Tyres | Drivers | 1 | 2 | 3 | 4 | 5 | 6 | 7 | 8 | 9 | 10 | 11 | 12 | 13 | 14 | 15 | 16 | Points | WCC |
|---|---|---|---|---|---|---|---|---|---|---|---|---|---|---|---|---|---|---|---|---|---|---|
| 1998 | Minardi | Ford JD Zetec-R V10 | **B** | | AUS | BRA | ARG | SMR | ESP | MON | CAN | FRA | GBR | AUT | GER | HUN | BEL | ITA | LUX | JPN | **0** | **NC** |
| 1998 | Minardi | Ford JD Zetec-R V10 | **B** | Shinji Nakano | Ret | Ret | 13 | Ret | 14 | 9 | 7 | 17 | 8 | 11 | Ret | 15 | 8 | Ret | 15 | Ret | **0** | **NC** |
| 1998 | Minardi | Ford JD Zetec-R V10 | **B** | Esteban Tuero | Ret | Ret | Ret | 8 | 15 | Ret | Ret | Ret | Ret | Ret | 16 | Ret | Ret | 11 | Ret | Ret | **0** | **NC** |
