= 1999 Australian Grand Prix =

First round of the 1999 Formula One World Championship

Race 1 of 16 in the 1999 Formula One World Championship
← Previous race	Next race →
- Melbourne Grand Prix Circuit (last modified in 1998)

Race details
- Date: 7 March 1999
- Official name: 1999 Qantas Australian Grand Prix
- Location: Albert Park, Melbourne, Australia
- Course: Temporary street circuit
- Course length: 5.303 km (3.295 miles)
- Distance: 57 laps, 302.271 km (187.823 miles)
- Scheduled distance: 58 laps, 307.574 km (191.118 miles)
- Weather: Sunny and dry with temperatures reaching up to 19 °C (66 °F)

Pole position
Driver	(Finland) Mika Häkkinen	McLaren-Mercedes
- Time: 1:30.462

Fastest lap
Driver	(Germany) Michael Schumacher	Ferrari
- Time: 1:32.112 on lap 55

Podium
First	(United Kingdom) Eddie Irvine	Ferrari
Second	(Germany) Heinz-Harald Frentzen	Jordan-Mugen-Honda
Third	(Germany) Ralf Schumacher	Williams-Supertec

The 1999 Australian Grand Prix (formally the 1999 Qantas Australian Grand Prix) was a Formula One motor race held on 7 March 1999 at the Albert Park Circuit. The 57-lap race was the first round of the 1999 Formula One World Championship, the 50th World Championship season in the history of Formula One.

Mika Häkkinen and David Coulthard dominated in practice and the opening stage of the race but retired with technical problems; the new McLaren MP4/14 proved to be very fast but not yet reliable, a trait shared by a number of Adrian Newey designed cars. Michael Schumacher also had problems during this eventful race, which gave his Ferrari teammate Eddie Irvine the opportunity to take his first Grand Prix victory. He made no mistakes and beat Heinz-Harald Frentzen and Ralf Schumacher to the finish by a few seconds. It was Frentzen's first race at Jordan-Mugen-Honda.

== Report ==
=== Free practice ===
==== Friday ====
Heinz-Harald Frentzen was the first car on track and initially topped the list, but Mika Häkkinen took the lead halfway through the first session. After several improvements he ended the session with a time of 1 minute and 33.213 seconds, with McLaren teammate David Coulthard in second place. The Stewart team performed well; Rubens Barrichello and Johnny Herbert ended the session in sixth and seventh position, behind Heinz-Harald Frentzen, Giancarlo Fisichella and Jarno Trulli. The debutants (Marc Gené, Pedro de la Rosa, and Ricardo Zonta) and the returnees (Alessandro Zanardi and Luca Badoer) were at the back of the field, but the final two positions were occupied by Olivier Panis and Michael Schumacher. Both had technical problems and completed only a few laps. Damon Hill, Alexander Wurz, and Badoer had small off-track moments but were able to continue without problems.

Coulthard was fastest for a short while in the second session, but Häkkinen quickly reset the order with a time of 1 minute and 31.985 seconds. On his next attempt, Häkkinen spun and crashed into the wall in the last turn before the main straight, causing the first red flag of the season. The session was stopped for 15 minutes; Häkkinen was unhurt, but the McLaren was badly damaged and his practice session was over. In the final minute Coulthard beat his time by one hundredth of a second. Stewart and Jordan were still looking good with Barrichello in third, ahead of Frentzen, Herbert and Hill. After the break Michael Schumacher had been the first to go out, but he could not do better than seventh, with a gap of over 1.5 seconds to the McLarens. Several drivers went off the track again including Coulthard, Frentzen, Hill, Ralf Schumacher and Zanardi. The Sauber team had somewhat more serious problems: Pedro Diniz stopped on track as a precaution when warning lights lit up, while his teammate Jean Alesi hit the wall. Zanardi and Zonta also stopped on track; Zonta's transmission broke and he ended the session last because of it, just behind de la Rosa, Gené and Badoer.

==== Saturday ====
The first quick time on Saturday was set by Ralf Schumacher, and Frentzen momentarily topped the list as well before Coulthard took the lead. After three improvements his best time was 1 minute and 31.140 seconds, but Häkkinen went marginally quicker just before the break. Gené and Hill spun off into the gravel, while Zonta stopped on track again with transmission problems. After the break Wurz spun into the tyre barriers and caused a red flag. Both the Sauber drivers, as well as de la Rosa and Trulli ended their session prematurely after a spin, while most drivers missed a corner once or twice, getting used to the lower grip level of the new 4-grooved front tires. Despite that, the dominance of McLaren took on breath-taking form. Häkkinen was fastest with a time of 1 minute and 30.324 seconds, six-tenths quicker than teammate Coulthard and a full 2.2 seconds faster than third man Herbert. The next second covered another 11 cars, down to Ralf Schumacher in 15th place. Hill was fourth, followed by Jacques Villeneuve, who beat Michael Schumacher and did better than his BAR teammate Zonta, who completed only three laps and ended the session last, again.

=== Qualifying ===
The results of the qualifying session were basically the same as the year before: Häkkinen beat Coulthard, while Michael Schumacher lead the rest of the field. After ten minutes, Herbert was the first to go out and set a time, followed by Zanardi who was marginally quicker on his fourth consecutive fast lap. After that, Barrichello took over first place, until the McLarens came out. Häkkinen made a mistake and spoiled his first run, but then took a firm lead with a time of 1 minute and 31.063 seconds. Coulthard was two-tenths slower and spun off into the gravel, but was able to continue. Villeneuve was third fastest for a moment but was beaten by Barrichello and Michael Schumacher, who improved his time to 1 minute and 31.781 seconds. Coulthard's next attack on Häkkinen's provisional pole time failed by one thousandth of a second. Two laps later he did it, with a time of 1 minute and 30.946 seconds, but Häkkinen countered in the final minute and took the pole position with 1 minute and 30.462 seconds, nearly half a second faster than Coulthard. Barrichello's fourth place behind Michael Schumacher was impressive. Not so impressive were Zanardi's 15th place, Alesi's 16th and most notably Panis' 20th position. As in the earlier practice sessions, many drivers left the track momentarily; Michael Schumacher even three times. Gené ended his session in the gravel, and the yellow flags spoiled a quick run for many drivers. To add to Gené's problems, Häkkinen's very fast lap time at the end of the session had pushed him off the starting grid, because the 107% time was now 1 minute and 36.974 seconds, and with 1 minute 37.013 seconds the Spaniard was 0.039 seconds outside the limit. By the same reasoning, the Minardi team issued an official request that Gené be allowed to start, which was subsequently granted by the Stewarts of the Meeting.

=== Warm up ===
In the pre-race warm up session, Coulthard and Häkkinen took turns setting the fastest time. Eventually Coulthard was quickest with 1 minute and 32.560 seconds, one-tenth ahead of Häkkinen. Panis performed better and beat his qualifying time, while other drivers were having problems. Hill went off and straight into the tyre barriers after the throttle had stuck open, and Zanardi had to switch to the spare car because of electrical problems with his race car. Ralf Schumacher got bogged down in the gravel, while Badoer, Coulthard, Diniz, Fisichella, de la Rosa, Toranosuke Takagi and Wurz all went off the track but were able to continue; Takagi only just missed the barriers. Alesi and Zonta collided when Zonta tried to pass and Alesi closed the door.

=== Race ===
Mika Häkkinen and David Coulthard had dominated all sessions throughout the weekend with laptimes over a second quicker than anybody else, and with both cars starting from the front row of the grid, the race was looking to be an easy win for the McLaren team. The first signs of trouble came before the race had even begun; while the other drivers made their way to the dummy grid, pole sitter Häkkinen was still in the pits with a problem. At the last minute the team decided that he would have to use the spare car, and just before the pit lane closed Häkkinen was on his way. The warm up lap started without incidents but when the last cars were lining up for the start, there was smoke coming from the Stewart cars of Rubens Barrichello and Johnny Herbert. Both had an oil leak that had set a small fire underneath the bodywork. The start was aborted and the fires were put out. Barrichello got the spare car and had to start from the pit lane, while Herbert was out of options and became the first retirement of the race. After some delay it was announced that there would be a new race over 57 laps, one less than the originally scheduled 58. When the new warm up lap was about to start, there was further confusion at McLaren when Häkkinen's car was started while it was still in gear. Michael Schumacher had qualified third – right behind Häkkinen on the grid – and while McLaren team-members worked frantically to get Häkkinen underway, Schumacher had to wait, and his engine stalled when the gearbox jumped out of neutral. Further down the field, Takagi's engine stalled as well. Despite the visible state of panic at McLaren, Häkkinen managed to get going before the last car had left the grid, and so he was allowed to retake his original pole position on the starting grid. Schumacher on the other hand was not so fortunate and had to start at the back of the grid along with Takagi.

Häkkinen made good use of his pole position at the second race start and took the lead, followed closely by Coulthard, Irvine, Frentzen, Ralf Schumacher and Fisichella. Further back Alesi immediately slowed to a stop with a broken gearbox, while Trulli made a good start from twelfth on the grid and tried to pass Hill in turn three. The cars touched; Hill spun into the gravel and retired, while Trulli continued and took seventh place from Villeneuve on the following lap. Also on lap 2, Zanardi dropped back to 21st. The top six remained unchanged during the opening stages of the race. While the McLarens pulled clear of the rest of the field, Michael Schumacher had started his push to the front and was back up to eleventh after only nine laps. After thirteen laps Häkkinen and Coulthard were leading third-placed Irvine by 18 seconds when Coulthard suddenly came into the pits and retired with transmission problems. One lap later Häkkinen lost his advantage on Irvine when the safety car was deployed; Villeneuve had lost his rear wing on the back straight and he was lucky to touch the wall only slowly after a series of high-speed spins. The race was run behind safety car for three laps while Villeneuve's car was removed. Diniz, Zonta and Badoer took the opportunity to try to save time by making a pit stop while the safety car was out.

When the race was restarted on lap 18, Häkkinen seemed to be in trouble again when his car did not accelerate properly, bunching up the cars behind him. Several drivers swerved around the slow McLaren, including Barrichello who was later given a stop-and-go penalty because he passed Michael Schumacher before the start/finish line. After the race the Brazilian claimed that he passed Schumacher accidentally while trying to avoid a collision. Irvine took the lead ahead of Frentzen, Trulli, Ralf Schumacher, and Michael Schumacher, while Häkkinen came into the pits after a slow lap and retired with throttle problems. On lap 19, Zanardi crashed and the safety car was deployed for the second time. Barrichello and Trulli made their pit stops, with Trulli even making two. The race was restarted once again on lap 25. Irvine led followed by Frentzen, Ralf Schumacher, Michael Schumacher and Diniz.

On lap 27, Michael Schumacher had a puncture but he made it back to the pits. The front wing of his Ferrari had been damaged by vibrations and it was replaced with a wing originally intended for Irvine's car, bearing the number 4. On lap 28, Diniz had to retire from 4th with a transmission problem. Barrichello was now 4th, followed by Zonta and Takagi. On the next lap Wurz had a spectacular spin when his rear suspension failed. On lap 32, Barrichello came into the pits to take his stop-and-go penalty. Zonta made his second pit stop. Badoer was 5th for a short while. On lap 34 Ralf Schumacher made a pit stop and dropped to 4th. Three laps later, Irvine and Frentzen pitted at the same time but Irvine kept the lead and rejoined just in front of Fisichella. On lap 38 Fisichella made a pit stop and dropped to 5th behind de la Rosa. Michael Schumacher drove through the pit lane without making a stop. The next lap Michael Schumacher came into the pits again and the steering wheel of his Ferrari was replaced. On lap 40 Barrichello passed Zonta and was now 7th. On lap 41 de la Rosa made his second pit stop and lost his 4th place to Fisichella. Barrichello took 6th from Takagi. On lap 43 Barrichello passed de la Rosa for 5th. With eleven laps to go Zonta came in to have his rear wing checked and rejoined just ahead of race leader Irvine, holding him up for two laps before slowing down with gearbox problems. At the finish line Irvine was first, winning his first Grand Prix, ahead of Frentzen, Ralf Schumacher, Fisichella and Barrichello. De la Rosa was 6th, scoring a point on his Formula One debut.

== Classification ==
=== Qualifying ===
Pos	No	Driver	Constructor	Lap	Gap	Grid
1	1	(Finland) Mika Häkkinen	McLaren-Mercedes	1:30.462		1
2	2	(United Kingdom) David Coulthard	McLaren-Mercedes	1:30.946	+0.484	2
3	3	(Germany) Michael Schumacher	Ferrari	1:31.781	+1.319	3
4	16	(Brazil) Rubens Barrichello	Stewart-Ford	1:32.148	+1.686	4
5	8	(Germany) Heinz-Harald Frentzen	Jordan-Mugen-Honda	1:32.276	+1.814	5
6	4	(United Kingdom) Eddie Irvine	Ferrari	1:32.289	+1.827	6
7	9	(Italy) Giancarlo Fisichella	Benetton-Playlife	1:32.540	+2.078	7
8	6	(Germany) Ralf Schumacher	Williams-Supertec	1:32.691	+2.229	8
9	7	(United Kingdom) Damon Hill	Jordan-Mugen-Honda	1:32.695	+2.233	9
10	10	(Austria) Alexander Wurz	Benetton-Playlife	1:32.789	+2.327	10
11	22	(Canada) Jacques Villeneuve	BAR-Supertec	1:32.888	+2.426	11
12	19	(Italy) Jarno Trulli	Prost-Peugeot	1:32.971	+2.509	12
13	17	(United Kingdom) Johnny Herbert	Stewart-Ford	1:32.991	+2.529	13
14	12	(Brazil) Pedro Diniz	Sauber-Petronas	1:33.374	+2.912	14
15	5	(Italy) Alessandro Zanardi	Williams-Supertec	1:33.549	+3.087	15
16	11	(France) Jean Alesi	Sauber-Petronas	1:33.910	+3.448	16
17	15	(Japan) Toranosuke Takagi	Arrows	1:34.182	+3.720	17
18	14	(Spain) Pedro de la Rosa	Arrows	1:34.244	+3.782	18
19	23	(Brazil) Ricardo Zonta	BAR-Supertec	1:34.412	+3.950	19
20	18	(France) Olivier Panis	Prost-Peugeot	1:35.068	+4.606	20
21	20	(Italy) Luca Badoer	Minardi-Ford	1:35.316	+4.854	21
107% time: 1:36.794
22	21	(Spain) Marc Gené	Minardi-Ford	1:37.013	+6.551	22^{1}

Notes

- ^1 – Marc Gené failed to set a time within 107% of pole position but was allowed to start by the stewards due to setting appropriate free practice times.

=== Race ===
Pos	No	Driver	Constructor	Laps	Time/Retired	Grid	Points
1	4	(United Kingdom) Eddie Irvine	Ferrari	57	1:35:01.659	6	10
2	8	(Germany) Heinz-Harald Frentzen	Jordan-Mugen-Honda	57	+1.027	5	6
3	6	(Germany) Ralf Schumacher	Williams-Supertec	57	+7.012	8	4
4	9	(Italy) Giancarlo Fisichella	Benetton-Playlife	57	+33.418	7	3
5	16	(Brazil) Rubens Barrichello	Stewart-Ford	57	+54.698	4	2
6	14	(Spain) Pedro de la Rosa	Arrows	57	+1:24.317	18	1
7	15	(Japan) Toranosuke Takagi	Arrows	57	+1:26.288	17	
8	3	(Germany) Michael Schumacher	Ferrari	56	+1 Lap	3	
Ret	23	(Brazil) Ricardo Zonta	BAR-Supertec	48	Gearbox	19	
Ret	20	(Italy) Luca Badoer	Minardi-Ford	42	Gearbox	21	
Ret	10	(Austria) Alexander Wurz	Benetton-Playlife	28	Suspension	10	
Ret	12	(Brazil) Pedro Diniz	Sauber-Petronas	27	Transmission	14	
Ret	21	(Spain) Marc Gené	Minardi-Ford	25	Collision	22	
Ret	19	(Italy) Jarno Trulli	Prost-Peugeot	25	Collision	12	
Ret	18	(France) Olivier Panis	Prost-Peugeot	23	Wheel	20	
Ret	1	(Finland) Mika Häkkinen	McLaren-Mercedes	21	Throttle	1	
Ret	5	(Italy) Alessandro Zanardi	Williams-Supertec	19	Spun off/accident	15	
Ret	2	(United Kingdom) David Coulthard	McLaren-Mercedes	15	Hydraulics	2	
Ret	22	(Canada) Jacques Villeneuve	BAR-Supertec	14	Rear Wing Failure	11	
Ret	7	(United Kingdom) Damon Hill	Jordan-Mugen-Honda	0	Collision	9	
Ret	11	(France) Jean Alesi	Sauber-Petronas	0	Gearbox	16	
DNS	17	(United Kingdom) Johnny Herbert	Stewart-Ford	0	Fire before start	13	

== Championship standings after the race ==
Drivers' Championship standings

Pos	Driver	Points
1	(United Kingdom) Eddie Irvine	10
2	(Germany) Heinz-Harald Frentzen	6
3	(Germany) Ralf Schumacher	4
4	(Italy) Giancarlo Fisichella	3
5	(Brazil) Rubens Barrichello	2

Constructors' Championship standings

Pos	Constructor	Points
1	(Italy) Ferrari	10
2	(Republic of Ireland) Jordan-Mugen-Honda	6
3	(United Kingdom) Williams-Supertec	4
4	(Italy) Benetton-Playlife	3
5	(United Kingdom) Stewart-Ford	2

- Note: Only the top five positions are included for both sets of standings.

== Sources ==
- van Vliet, Arjen (April 1999). "Grand Prix van Australië". Formule 1. 5 (4): 24, 26–27, 31.
- "1999 Australian GP: Overview". ChicaneF1.com.

Previous race: 1998 Japanese Grand Prix	FIA Formula One World Championship; 1999 season	Next race: 1999 Brazilian Grand Prix
Previous race: 1998 Australian Grand Prix	Australian Grand Prix	Next race: 2000 Australian Grand Prix
