= Statue of Juan Manuel Fangio =

Statue in Monaco

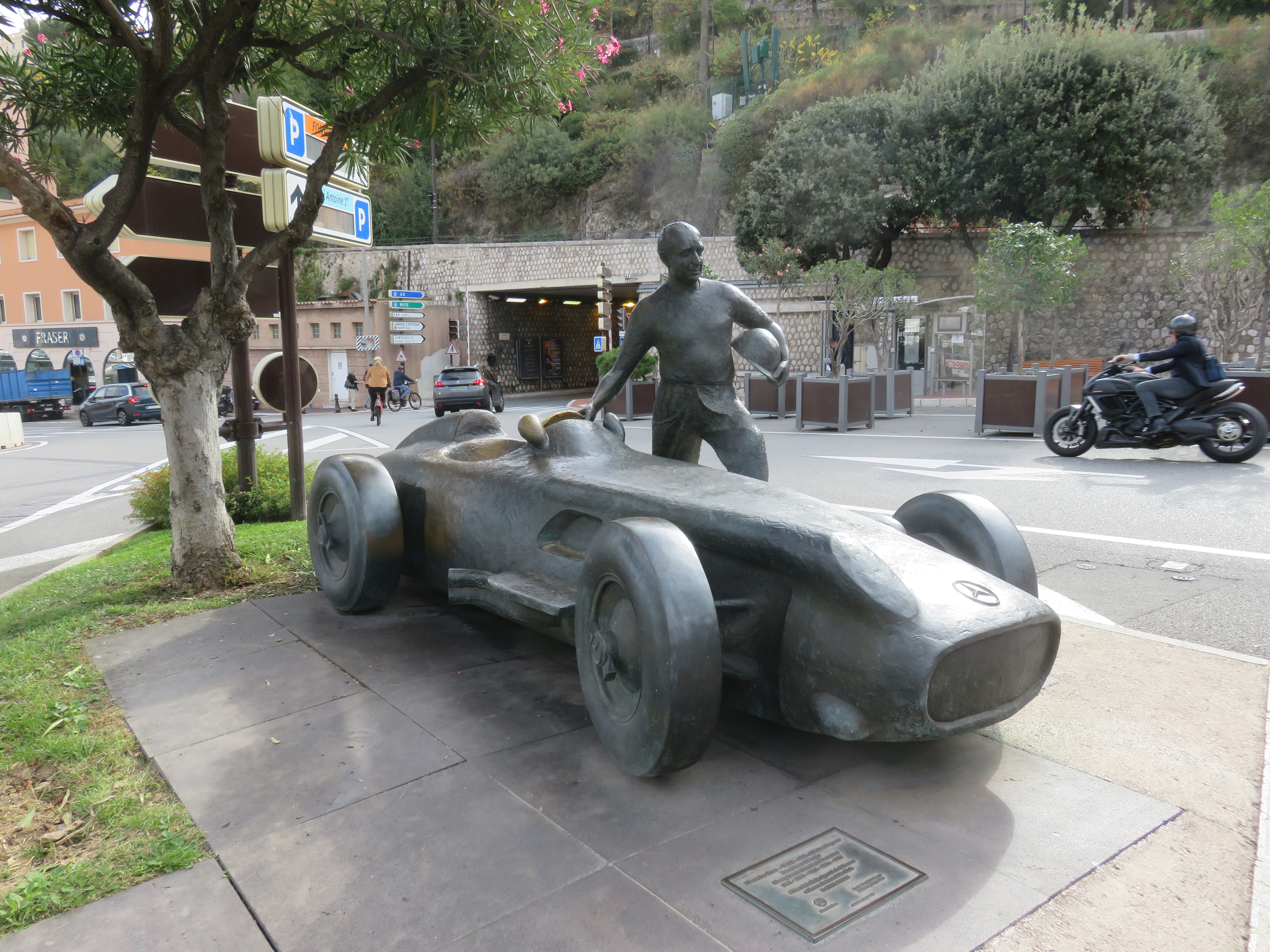
- The sculpture in 2021.
- Interactive map of Statue of Juan Manuel Fangio
- Location: Avenue du Port, Monte Carlo, Monaco
- Coordinates: 43.732485°N 7.422612°E
- Designer: Joaquim Ros i Sabaté
- Type: Statue
- Material: Bronze
- Completion date: 1996
- Opening date: 20 May 2003
- Dedicated to: Juan Manuel Fangio

The statue of Juan Manuel Fangio (French: Statue de Juan Manuel Fangio) is a bronze statue in Monaco, placed at Avenue du Port in the district of Monte Carlo. It was designed by Joaquim Ros i Sabaté in 1996, and unveiled at its current location on 20 May 2003. It depicts Juan Manuel Fangio (1911–1995), an Argentine race driver and five-time Formula One champion in the 1950s, standing next to 1954 Mercedes-Benz W196 race car.

== History ==
The monument was dedicated to Juan Manuel Fangio (1911–1995), an Argentine race driver and five-time Formula One champion in the 1950s. It was designed by sculptor Joaquim Ros i Sabaté in 1996, and donated by him to the Automobile Club de Monaco. It was officially unveiled on 20 May 2003 in Monaco by prince Albert II, then an heir to the country throne.

In 2006, there were also made five identical replicas, that were placed in Buenos Aires in Argentina, Monza in Italy, Stuttgart and Nürburg in Germany, and Montmeló in Spain.

== Characteristics ==
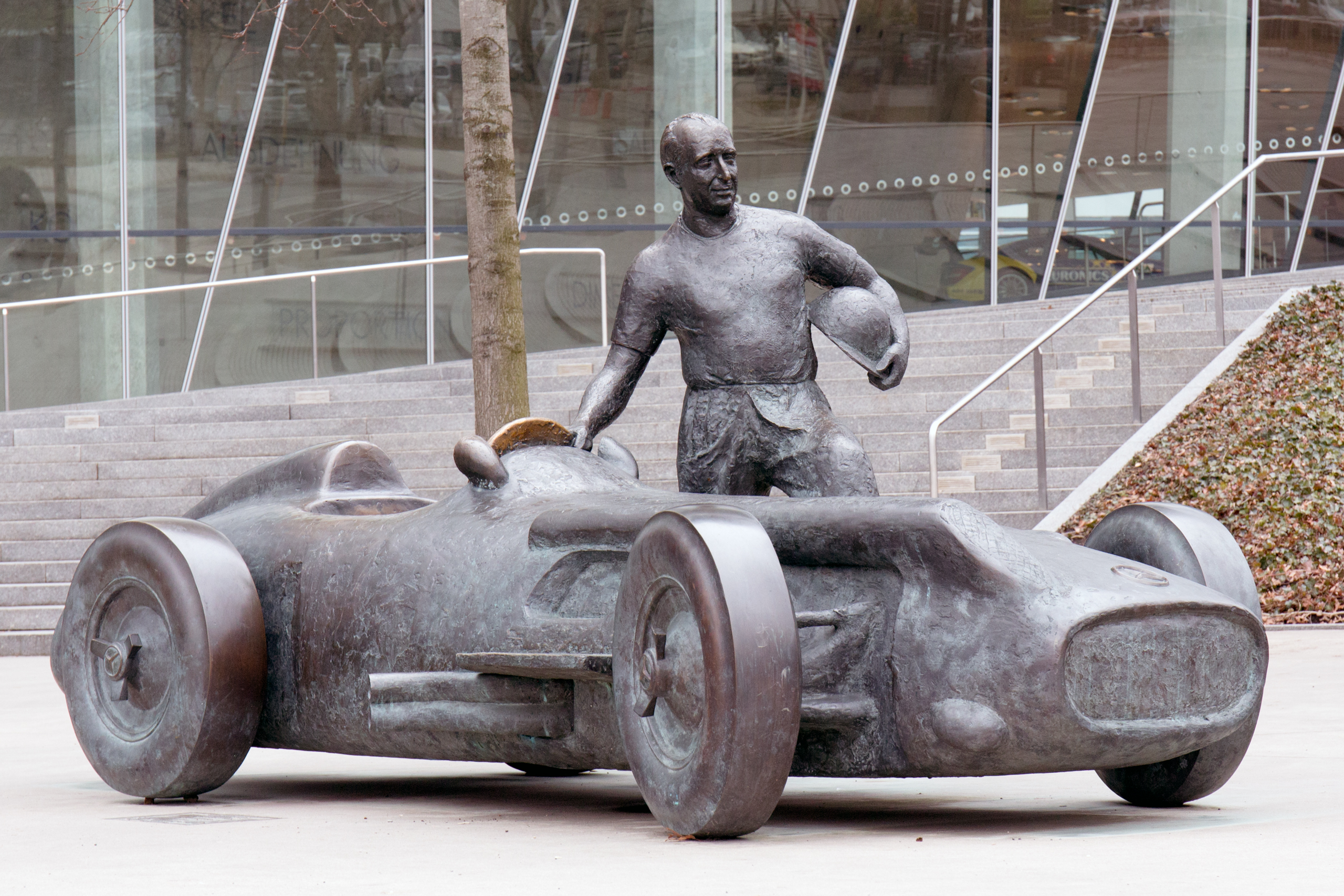
The replica of the statue in Stuttgart, Germany.

The monument is located in the district of Monte Carlo, at the intersection of Avenue du Port and Quai Albert 1er. It was placed at one of the turns of the Circuit de Monaco.

It is a bronze statue depicting Juan Manuel Fangio and his race car, a 1954 Mercedes-Benz W196. The sculpture corresponds to the actual size of the racing car and driver. Fangio has his right hand on the steering wheel and his helmet under his left arm. One foot stands on a deflector plate of the vehicle. His gaze is directed right into the eye of the beholder. The inside of the car is hollowed, allowing people to climb inside and sit in the driver seat.

The identical replicas of the monument are also located in Buenos Aires in Argentina, Monza in Italy, Stuttgart and Nürburg in Germany, and Montmeló in Spain.

== See also ==
- Statue of William Grover, another monument in Monaco dedicated to a racing driver
- F1 McLaren, another sculpture in Monaco depicting a Formula One car
