= Statue of William Grover =

Statue in Monaco

- Interactive map of Statue of William Grover
- Location: Monte Carlo, Monaco
- Coordinates: 43.736786°N 7.421730°E
- Designer: François Chevalier
- Type: Statue
- Material: Bronze
- Opening date: 17 May 2001
- Dedicated to: William Grover-Williams

The statue of William Grover (French: Statue de William Grover) is a bronze statue in Monaco, placed at the roundabout at the intersection of Boulevard Albert 1er, Rue Grimaldi, Avenue John F. Kenedy, and Avenue d'Ostende, within the district of Monte Carlo. It is dedicated to William Grover-Williams, a racing driver who, on 14 April 1929, won the first ever Monaco Grand Prix, and depicted driving his Bugatti Type 35. The statue was designed by François Chevalier and unveiled on 17 May 2001.

== History ==
The monument was designed by sculptor François Chevalier, and unveiled on 17 May 2001, by Rainier III, the Prince of Monaco. It was dedicated to William Grover-Williams, a racing driver who, on 14 April 1929, won the first ever Monaco Grand Prix. He was depicted sitting inside of Bugatti Type 35, which he drove during the aforementioned race.

== Characteristics ==
The monument is placed at the roundabout at the intersection of Boulevard Albert 1er, Rue Grimaldi, Avenue John F. Kenedy, and Avenue d'Ostende, within the district of Monte Carlo. It is located near part of the Circuit de Monaco. It consists of a life-sized bronze statue of William Grover-Williams driving a Bugatti Type 35 race car.

== See also ==
- Statue of Juan Manuel Fangio, another monument in Monaco dedicated to a racing driver
- F1 McLaren, another sculpture in Monaco depicting a Formula One car
