= F1 McLaren (sculpture) =

Sculpture in Monaco

- Interactive map of F1 McLaren
- Location: Monaco
- Coordinates: 43.741054°N 7.430017°E
- Type: Sculpture
- Material: Bronze
- Opening date: 4 June 2000

F1 McLaren is a bronze sculpture in Monaco, located at Portier Roundabout, within the district of Monte-Carlo. It commemorates the victory of the McLaren race team in the 1998 Monaco Grand Prix of the Formula One Championship, and depicts a McLaren MP4/13 open-wheel race car, that was used by its drivers. The sculpture was designed by Christian Maas, and was unveiled on 4 June 2000.

== History ==
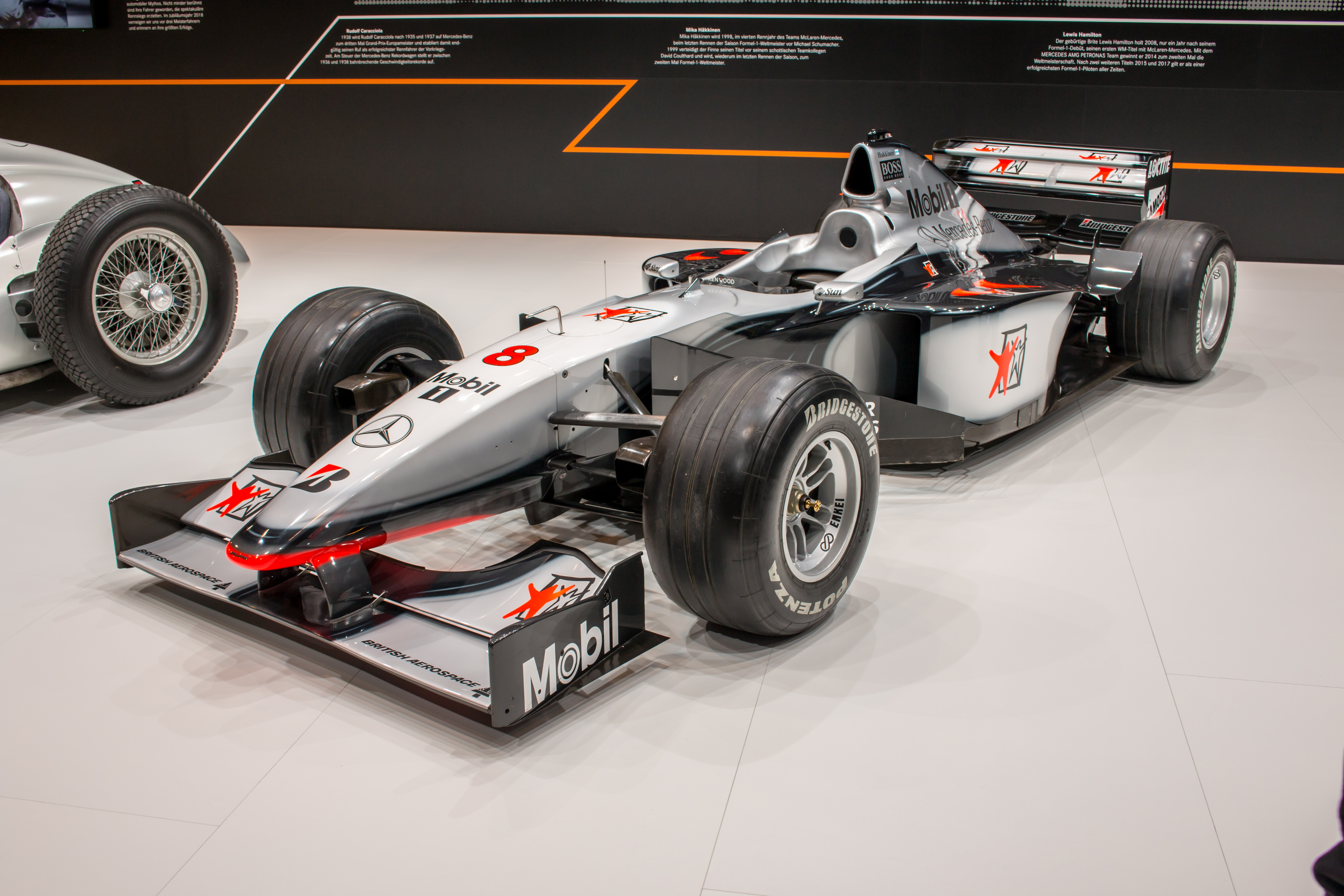
The McLaren MP4/13 used in the 1998 Formula One World Championship, which served as the reference for the sculpture.

The bronze sculpture depicts McLaren MP4/13 open-wheel race car used by the McLaren team in the 1998 Formula One World Championship The sculpture was erected to commemorate the victory of McLaren team in the 1998 Monaco Grand Prix of the Formula One Championship. In the event it was represented by drivers Mika Häkkinen and David Coulthard. The sculpture was designed by Christian Maas, and was unveiled on 4 June 2000, during the closing ceremony of the 2000 Monaco Grand Prix. It was attended by Rainier III, the Prince of Monaco, together with his family, the drivers, and the sculptor, among others.

== Characteristics ==
The bronze sculpture depicts McLaren MP4/13 open-wheel race car used by the McLaren team in the 1998 Formula One World Championship. It is placed at Portier Roundabout.

== See also ==
- Statue of Juan Manuel Fangio, another sculpture in Monaco depicting a Formula One car
- Statue of William Grover, another sculpture in Monaco depicting a Formula One car
