= Prost AP05 =

Formula One racing car

- Category: Formula One
- Constructor: Prost
- Predecessor: AP04

Technical specifications
- Engine: Acer-badged Ferrari Tipo 050 3.0-litre V10 (90°)
- Transmission: Ferrari
- Tyres: Michelin

Competition history
- Notable entrants: Prost Acer
Races	Wins	Poles	F/Laps
0	0	0	0
- Constructors' Championships: 0
- Drivers' Championships: 0

The Prost AP05 was a Formula 1 car built by Prost Grand Prix, which was to be used in the 2002 season. It never took part in a race.

== History ==
The Prost AP05 was built on a 50% scale and was tested in a wind tunnel. On December 9, 2001, Alain Prost announced that the car might not be ready for race one with the plan to start the season with the Prost AP04 and launch the AP05 at the start of the European leg of the season. Prost announced that the new car would be a big step forward, but it may not be as reliable as the previous design. Soon the team lost finances and pulled out of Formula 1.
