= Prost AP04 =

Formula One racing car

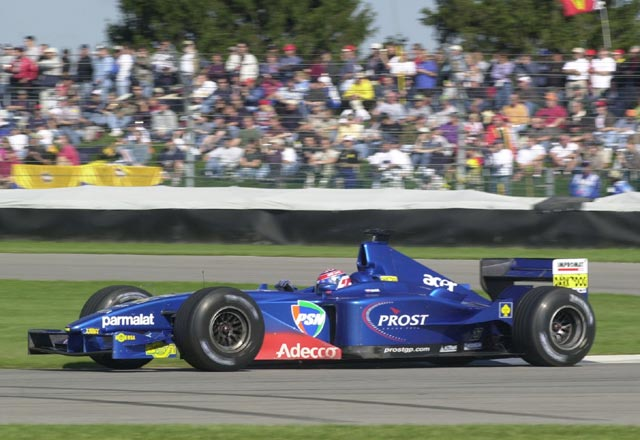
- Tomáš Enge driving the AP04 at the 2001 United States Grand Prix
- Category: Formula One
- Constructor: Prost
- Designers: Henri Durand (Technical Director); Jean-Paul Gousset (Chief Designer); Loïc Bigois (Head of Aerodynamics)
- Predecessor: AP03
- Successor: AP05 (never raced)

Technical specifications
- Chassis: Carbon-fibre monocoque
- Suspension (front): torsion bars, dampers
- Suspension (rear): torsion bars, dampers
- Engine: Acer 01A (Ferrari Tipo 049) 3.0-litre V10 (90°) NA mid-engine
- Transmission: Ferrari 7-speed titanium and carbon longitudinal semi-automatic sequential
- Power: 825 hp @ 17,300 rpm
- Fuel: Shell
- Tyres: Michelin

Competition history
- Notable entrants: Prost Acer
- Notable drivers: 22. (France) Jean Alesi; 22. (Germany) Heinz-Harald Frentzen; 23. (Argentina) Gastón Mazzacane; 23. (Brazil) Luciano Burti; 23. (Czech Republic) Tomáš Enge
- Debut: 2001 Australian Grand Prix
- Last event: 2001 Japanese Grand Prix
| Races | Wins | Poles | F/Laps |
|---|---|---|---|
| 17 | 0 | 0 | 0 |
- Constructors' Championships: 0
- Drivers' Championships: 0

The Prost AP04 was the car with which the Prost team competed in the 2001 Formula One World Championship. Over the course of the season, the car was raced by five drivers: French veteran Jean Alesi, Argentine Gastón Mazzacane, Brazilian Luciano Burti, German Heinz-Harald Frentzen and Czech Tomáš Enge.

== Background and design ==
For Prost, 2001 was a season of struggle as Alain Prost tried to keep the team going. Initially, things looked quite promising after the catastrophic 2000 season, with the Diniz family becoming shareholders and bringing Parmalat sponsorship to the team. The AP04 also used a customer 2000-spec Ferrari engine and transmission, although the former was badged as an Acer in deference to the team's title sponsor. Prost was also one of several teams to opt for the new Michelin tyres on the French company's return to the sport. Alesi set fast times in winter testing, and the car appeared to show capable speed.

== Racing history ==
However, the team were mired in the midfield once the season began, fueling the speculation that the team had run an illegally fast car via running the car underweight during testing in an attempt to attract sponsors. However, the cars were much more reliable than the previous year's disastrous AP03, Alesi finishing all 12 races he had with the team (though being classified at the end, Alesi physically did not finish the European GP 2001, as he spun off trying to overtake Kimi Räikkönen on lap 64, but that was enough to be classified, though three laps down on the winner). In the process he scored four precious points but fell out of favour with team principal Alain Prost and left the team for Jordan after the German GP to replace the sacked Heinz-Harald Frentzen. The German took over Alesi's role as team leader, but could not add to the points tally. A highlight of Frentzen's brief stint with the team was qualifying 4th at the Belgian Grand Prix in a wet-dry session, only to throw that away by stalling on the grid at the start.

The team's driver problems were even more acute in the #23 car. Mazzacane was dropped after four races in favour of fellow-South American Luciano Burti, who had himself been dropped by Jaguar. Burti was quicker but also got involved in two enormous accidents which wrote off two chassis. The latter, at the Belgian GP put him out for the rest of the season. His replacement, Tomáš Enge, performed competently, but destroyed another car at the Japanese GP.

By the end of the season, however, the focus was firmly on Prost's impending collapse. Prost had fallen out with Diniz and his father, and the team was running out of money. A deal with Saudi Arabian prince Al-Waleed bin Talal to become a major shareholder fell through and Prost did not survive into 2002, folding with debts of around $25 million.

The team eventually finished ninth in the Constructors' Championship, with four points, all scored by Alesi.

== Aftermath ==
The cars and other assets were bought by Charles Nickerson's Phoenix Finance, which attempted to enter a team for 2002 in partnership with Tom Walkinshaw, using the in-house Arrows engines from 1998. Paul Stoddart had also tried to buy the Prost assets for his Minardi outfit, but was turned down, even though he made a much higher bid than Phoenix.

The new team had Mazzacane and Tarso Marques signed up to drive and arrived for the second round in Malaysia, intending to race. However, they were barred from doing so by the FIA, as they had not bought Prost's entry or paid the mandatory bond for new teams. A bid to overturn the decision in the High Court was rejected and thus ended the Prost team's presence in Formula One.

== Complete Formula One results ==
(key) (results in bold indicate pole position)

| Year | Entrant | Engine | Tyres | Drivers | 1 | 2 | 3 | 4 | 5 | 6 | 7 | 8 | 9 | 10 | 11 | 12 | 13 | 14 | 15 | 16 | 17 | Points | WCC |
|---|---|---|---|---|---|---|---|---|---|---|---|---|---|---|---|---|---|---|---|---|---|---|---|
| 2001 | Prost Acer | Acer V10* | M | | AUS | MAL | BRA | SMR | ESP | AUT | MON | CAN | EUR | FRA | GBR | GER | HUN | BEL | ITA | USA | JPN | 4 | 9th |
| 2001 | Prost Acer | Acer V10* | M | (France) Jean Alesi | 9 | 9 | 8 | 9 | 10 | 10 | 6 | 5 | 15^{†} | 12 | 11 | 6 | | | | | | 4 | 9th |
| 2001 | Prost Acer | Acer V10* | M | (Germany) Heinz-Harald Frentzen | | | | | | | | | | | | | Ret | 9 | Ret | 10 | 12 | 4 | 9th |
| 2001 | Prost Acer | Acer V10* | M | (Argentina) Gastón Mazzacane | Ret | 12 | Ret | Ret | | | | | | | | | | | | | | 4 | 9th |
| 2001 | Prost Acer | Acer V10* | M | (Brazil) Luciano Burti | | | | | 11 | 11 | Ret | 8 | 12 | 10 | Ret | Ret | Ret | DNS | | | | 4 | 9th |
| 2001 | Prost Acer | Acer V10* | M | (Czech Republic) Tomáš Enge | | | | | | | | | | | | | | | 12 | 14 | Ret | 4 | 9th |

* Denotes Ferrari-built engines, badged as Acer
