= 1999 European Grand Prix =

Formula One motor race held in 1999

Race 14 of 16 in the 1999 Formula One World Championship
← Previous race	Next race →
- The Nürburgring in its 1999 configuration

Race details
- Date: 26 September 1999
- Official name: 1999 Warsteiner Grand Prix of Europe
- Location: Nürburgring; Nürburg, Germany
- Course: Permanent racing facility
- Course length: 4.556 km (2.831 miles)
- Distance: 66 laps, 300.696 km (186.852 miles)
- Scheduled distance: 67 laps, 305.252 km (189.684 miles)
- Weather: Wet/Dry

Pole position
Driver	(Germany) Heinz-Harald Frentzen	Jordan-Mugen-Honda
- Time: 1:19.910

Fastest lap
Driver	(Finland) Mika Häkkinen	McLaren-Mercedes
- Time: 1:21.282 on lap 64

Podium
First	(United Kingdom) Johnny Herbert	Stewart-Ford
Second	(Italy) Jarno Trulli	Prost-Peugeot
Third	(Brazil) Rubens Barrichello	Stewart-Ford

The 1999 European Grand Prix (formally the 1999 Warsteiner Grand Prix of Europe) was a Formula One motor race held on 26 September 1999 at the Nürburgring in Nürburg, Germany. It was the fourteenth race of the 1999 FIA Formula One World Championship. The 66-lap race was won by Johnny Herbert, driving a Stewart-Ford, with Jarno Trulli second in a Prost-Peugeot and Herbert's teammate Rubens Barrichello third.

It was considered to be one of the most eventful and exciting races of the 1999 season. Going into the race Mika Häkkinen, Eddie Irvine, Heinz-Harald Frentzen and David Coulthard were all harbouring World Championship aspirations. Häkkinen and Irvine were tied for the points lead, with Frentzen 10 points behind them and Coulthard a further two points back. In the previous round at Monza, Häkkinen had made an unforced error while leading, Coulthard and Irvine finished only fifth and sixth and Frentzen took his second race win of the season.

In the race, a high number of retirements saw Marc Gené take sixth place for the Minardi team, their first points since Pedro Lamy's at the 1995 Australian Grand Prix. The Stewart cars took first and third, with Prost's Jarno Trulli finishing second. As a consequence of the race, Häkkinen moved into the lead in the World Drivers' Championship, two points ahead of Irvine, with Frentzen a further twelve behind. In the World Constructors Championship, McLaren extended their lead to twelve points over Ferrari. It would prove to be Johnny Herbert's third and final F1 victory, also his seventh and final podium in what was the only victory for the Stewart Grand Prix team as well as their only double podium. It was also the first podium finish of Jarno Trulli's F1 career, and the last podium finish for the Prost team.

This would be the last time until the 2003 Brazilian Grand Prix that both Ferraris in the race would fail to score points, and also the last time until the 2003 Australian Grand Prix that neither Ferrari driver finished on the podium. It was also the last win for an English driver until Jenson Button at the 2006 Hungarian Grand Prix.

== Report ==
=== Background ===
Heading into the race, McLaren driver Mika Häkkinen and Ferrari driver Eddie Irvine were tied for the lead of the World Drivers' Championship on 60 points each. Jordan driver Heinz-Harald Frentzen was third on 50, followed by Häkkinen's team-mate David Coulthard on 48. In the Constructors' Championship, McLaren led Ferrari by six points, 108 to 102, with Jordan third on 57.

Following the Italian Grand Prix on 12 September, four teams (McLaren, Williams, Jordan, Stewart) conducted testing sessions at the Magny-Cours circuit on 14–16 September. Coulthard set the fastest time on all three days of testing. Williams, Jordan and Stewart ran for only two days at Magny-Cours. Ferrari ran their pairing Irvine and Mika Salo at the team's test circuit of Mugello. Ferrari test driver and Minardi driver Luca Badoer performed engine development work at their test track at Fiorano with Irvine performing shakedown runs. Benetton performed aerodynamic mapping tests at RAF Kemble with Arrows and Minardi electing not to test.

=== Practice and qualifying ===
Two practice sessions were held before the Sunday race—one on Friday from 11:00 to 14:00 local time, and a second on Saturday morning between 09:00 and 11:00. The first practice session took place in dry conditions. The ambient temperature was 19 °C (66 °F) and the track temperature was 25 °C (77 °F) during the hour-long period.

Saturday afternoon's qualifying session was held from 13:00 to 14:00 local time. Each driver was limited to twelve laps with the implementation of a 107% rule to exclude slow drivers from competing in the Sunday race. The session was held on a wet track – the result of previous rainfall with isolated showers a few hours before qualifying. The ambient temperature ranged between 14 and 15 °C (57 and 59 °F), while the track temperature ranged between 15 and 18 °C (59 and 64 °F). Frentzen clinched second pole position of his career, in his Jordan 199, with a time of 1:19.910. Although he was dissatisfied with earlier problems finding the ideal setup during practice—he said that he felt fantastic to be on pole position—he believed he could have made a faster lap, as he was carrying five laps worth of fuel on board. Frentzen was joined on the front row by Coulthard who was two-tenths of a second slower.

=== Race ===
On race day the track was dry but the start was delayed when Alessandro Zanardi and Marc Gené lined up out of sequence on the grid, necessitating another formation lap. As the start was aborted during the start lights' sequence, the top five qualifiers and Jean Alesi actually jumped the start but were not penalised due to the aborting of the start. When the race finally got under way, Frentzen led from Häkkinen, but further back there was trouble at the first corner. Damon Hill's Jordan suffered an electrical failure in the middle of the pack which caused Alexander Wurz to swerve into Pedro Diniz, sending the Sauber into a barrel roll. The safety car was deployed while Diniz was helped uninjured from his car – a fortunate end result as it was later revealed that the Sauber's rollbar had failed when it hit the ground.

The race settled down with the top six Frentzen, Häkkinen, Coulthard, Ralf Schumacher, Giancarlo Fisichella, and Irvine. On lap 17, Irvine passed Fisichella after pressuring the Italian into running wide at turn 8. Whilst further back Zanardi was an unfortunate victim to the collision between Diniz and Wurz as his car was damaged from this incident earlier on and would eventually retire on lap 11 when his Supertec engine stalled. Just moments later the rain began to fall and Ralf Schumacher took advantage of the damp track to pass Coulthard. At the end of lap 20, Häkkinen pitted for wet tyres, which proved to be premature as the rain quickly blew over and the track dried. The following lap Irvine pitted for dry tyres but the stop lasted 28 seconds with the right-rear mechanics seemingly confused over a last minute change in tyre choice. Team mate Mika Salo had damaged his wing the previous lap leaving the Ferrari pitcrew unprepared for Irvine. On lap 24, Häkkinen on wet tyres was lapping around seven seconds slower than the leaders and was overtaken by Irvine over the start-finish straight dropping to 13th position. Soon afterwards, with his tyres clearly overheating, Häkkinen pitted again to change back to dry tyres emerging just in front of Fisichella, who was a full lap ahead of him.

Ralf Schumacher pitted from second position at the end of lap 27 for his scheduled first stop leaving Frentzen and Coulthard battling at the front followed by Fisichella twelve seconds behind the leaders in third place. At the end of lap 32 both Frentzen and Coulthard pitted for their first scheduled stops with both Jordan and McLaren mechanics impeccably turning their cars around in seven seconds, and both returning comfortably ahead of Schumacher. At this point in the race both Irvine and Häkkinen were well out of the points, meaning that if the order stayed the same Frentzen, Irvine, and Häkkinen would have all been tied for the points lead with two races to go, with Coulthard six points behind them.

What followed was a series of retirements. The first to fall was Frentzen, who ground to a halt at the first corner after his pitstop because he had forgotten to disable the car's anti-stall system. The team claimed it was an "electrical issue" in order to protect Frentzen. Coulthard inherited the lead and stayed out front until the rain came back with a vengeance. Coulthard chose to stay out on dry tyres while most pitted for wets, which ultimately proved to be a costly mistake, as he slid off the road and out of the race on the 38th lap as the conditions worsened. Within a handful of laps two Championship contenders had seen their hopes of winning the title fall by the wayside. Schumacher, still on dry tyres, then inherited the lead which he held until his pitstop six laps later. This allowed Fisichella, also on dry tyres, to take the lead with Schumacher in second, as the rain stopped. Meanwhile, Johnny Herbert had quietly moved up the order after changing to wet tyres just at the right time. Mika Salo would soon be forced to retire with brake problems.

The heartbreak then reached new levels. On lap 49, Fisichella spun out of the lead like Coulthard before him, giving the lead back to Schumacher. But then Schumacher too lost the lead when his right rear tyre punctured, allowing Herbert to take the lead which he would not lose. Further back the Minardis were taking full advantage of the unpredictable nature of the race with Luca Badoer in fourth and Gené in seventh. But with just 13 laps to go, Badoer's gearbox failed, denying the Ferrari test driver his first ever Formula One points and leaving him in tears. Gené was promoted to sixth, which became fifth when Jacques Villeneuve's car failed with a broken clutch, robbing the BAR team of a chance to get their first-ever point before 2000. Behind him, Irvine and Häkkinen had fought their way back into contention for points, with Irvine holding sixth ahead of Häkkinen. After cruising for most of the race, Häkkinen turned up the pressure, eventually forcing Irvine into a mistake and taking sixth place. At the front Barrichello tried to pass Jarno Trulli for second and make it a Stewart 1–2, but ultimately had to settle for third. Meanwhile, Häkkinen caught and passed Gené for fifth to earn two invaluable points, but Gené held onto sixth ahead of Irvine to give Minardi their first point in four seasons.

=== Post-race ===
It was the only race ever won by the Stewart Grand Prix team, as well as being the only time Stewart had two drivers finish on the podium. It was also first Grand Prix victory for a Ford-powered car since the 1994 European Grand Prix (in Jerez de la Frontera), the last Grand Prix victory for Johnny Herbert, the last podium finish for the Prost Grand Prix team and also the last-ever Formula One podium finish for the Peugeot engine, as of 2026. Jackie Stewart considered the race greater than any of his own race wins. This was the final time that both Ferrari cars failed to score until the 2003 Brazilian Grand Prix. This was also the last win for the Milton Keynes-based Formula One team until Sebastian Vettel won the 2009 Chinese Grand Prix in the pseudo-successor Red Bull Racing team.

Gené's performance, in finishing sixth ahead of championship contender Irvine, is considered by many as the deciding factor in the Drivers' Championship, for it is often believed that had Irvine passed Gené for sixth, he would have had the extra point to win the title (provided Michael Schumacher would have been in position to let Irvine pass him during the 1999 Japanese Grand Prix).

== Classification ==
=== Qualifying ===
Pos	No	Driver	Constructor	Lap	Gap	Grid
1	8	(Germany) Heinz-Harald Frentzen	Jordan-Mugen-Honda	1:19.910		1
2	2	(United Kingdom) David Coulthard	McLaren-Mercedes	1:20.176	+0.266	2
3	1	(Finland) Mika Häkkinen	McLaren-Mercedes	1:20.376	+0.466	3
4	6	(Germany) Ralf Schumacher	Williams-Supertec	1:20.444	+0.534	4
5	18	(France) Olivier Panis	Prost-Peugeot	1:20.638	+0.728	5
6	9	(Italy) Giancarlo Fisichella	Benetton-Playlife	1:20.781	+0.871	6
7	7	(United Kingdom) Damon Hill	Jordan-Mugen-Honda	1:20.818	+0.908	7
8	22	(Canada) Jacques Villeneuve	BAR-Supertec	1:20.825	+0.915	8
9	4	(United Kingdom) Eddie Irvine	Ferrari	1:20.842	+0.932	9
10	19	(Italy) Jarno Trulli	Prost-Peugeot	1:20.965	+1.055	10
11	10	(Austria) Alexander Wurz	Benetton-Playlife	1:21.144	+1.234	11
12	3	(Finland) Mika Salo	Ferrari	1:21.314	+1.404	12
13	12	(Brazil) Pedro Diniz	Sauber-Petronas	1:21.345	+1.435	13
14	17	(United Kingdom) Johnny Herbert	Stewart-Ford	1:21.379	+1.469	14
15	16	(Brazil) Rubens Barrichello	Stewart-Ford	1:21.490	+1.580	15
16	11	(France) Jean Alesi	Sauber-Petronas	1:21.634	+1.724	16
17	23	(Brazil) Ricardo Zonta	BAR-Supertec	1:22.267	+2.357	17
18	5	(Italy) Alessandro Zanardi	Williams-Supertec	1:22.284	+2.374	18
19	20	(Italy) Luca Badoer	Minardi-Ford	1:22.631	+2.721	19
20	21	(Spain) Marc Gené	Minardi-Ford	1:22.760	+2.850	20
21	15	(Japan) Toranosuke Takagi	Arrows	1:23.401	+3.491	21
22	14	(Spain) Pedro de la Rosa	Arrows	1:23.698	+3.788	22
107% time: 1:25.504

=== Race ===
Pos	No	Driver	Constructor	Laps	Time/Retired	Grid	Points
1	17	(United Kingdom) Johnny Herbert	Stewart-Ford	66	1:41:54.314	14	10
2	19	(Italy) Jarno Trulli	Prost-Peugeot	66	+ 22.619	10	6
3	16	(Brazil) Rubens Barrichello	Stewart-Ford	66	+ 22.866	15	4
4	6	(Germany) Ralf Schumacher	Williams-Supertec	66	+ 39.508	4	3
5	1	(Finland) Mika Häkkinen	McLaren-Mercedes	66	+ 1:02.950	3	2
6	21	(Spain) Marc Gené	Minardi-Ford	66	+ 1:05.154	20	1
7	4	(United Kingdom) Eddie Irvine	Ferrari	66	+ 1:06.683	9	
8	23	(Brazil) Ricardo Zonta	BAR-Supertec	65	+ 1 lap	17	
9	18	(France) Olivier Panis	Prost-Peugeot	65	+ 1 lap	5	
10	22	(Canada) Jacques Villeneuve	BAR-Supertec	61	Clutch	8	
Ret	20	(Italy) Luca Badoer	Minardi-Ford	53	Gearbox	19	
Ret	14	(Spain) Pedro de la Rosa	Arrows	52	Gearbox	22	
Ret	9	(Italy) Giancarlo Fisichella	Benetton-Playlife	48	Spun off	6	
Ret	3	(Finland) Mika Salo	Ferrari	44	Brakes	12	
Ret	15	(Japan) Toranosuke Takagi	Arrows	42	Accident	21	
Ret	2	(United Kingdom) David Coulthard	McLaren-Mercedes	37	Spun off	2	
Ret	11	(France) Jean Alesi	Sauber-Petronas	35	Halfshaft	16	
Ret	8	(Germany) Heinz-Harald Frentzen	Jordan-Mugen-Honda	32	Electrical	1	
Ret	5	(Italy) Alessandro Zanardi	Williams-Supertec	10	Collision	18	
Ret	7	(United Kingdom) Damon Hill	Jordan-Mugen-Honda	0	Electrical	7	
Ret	10	(Austria) Alexander Wurz	Benetton-Playlife	0	Collision	11	
Ret	12	(Brazil) Pedro Diniz	Sauber-Petronas	0	Collision	13	

== Championship standings after the race ==
Drivers' Championship standings

+/–	Pos	Driver	Points
	1	(Finland) Mika Häkkinen*	62
	2	(United Kingdom) Eddie Irvine*	60
	3	(Germany) Heinz-Harald Frentzen*	50
	4	(United Kingdom) David Coulthard*	48
1	5	(Germany) Ralf Schumacher	33

Constructors' Championship standings

+/–	Pos	Constructor	Points
	1	(United Kingdom) McLaren-Mercedes*	110
	2	(Italy) Ferrari*	102
	3	(Republic of Ireland) Jordan-Mugen-Honda	57
	4	(United Kingdom) Williams-Supertec	33
	5	(United Kingdom) Stewart-Ford	31

- Note: Only the top five positions are included for both sets of standings.
- Bold text and an asterisk indicates competitors who still had a theoretical chance of becoming World Champion.

Previous race: 1999 Italian Grand Prix	FIA Formula One World Championship; 1999 season	Next race: 1999 Malaysian Grand Prix
Previous race: 1997 European Grand Prix; Previous race at the Nürburgring: 1998 Luxembourg Grand Prix	European Grand Prix	Next race: 2000 European Grand Prix
