= Peugeot V10 =

Peugeot V10 engine
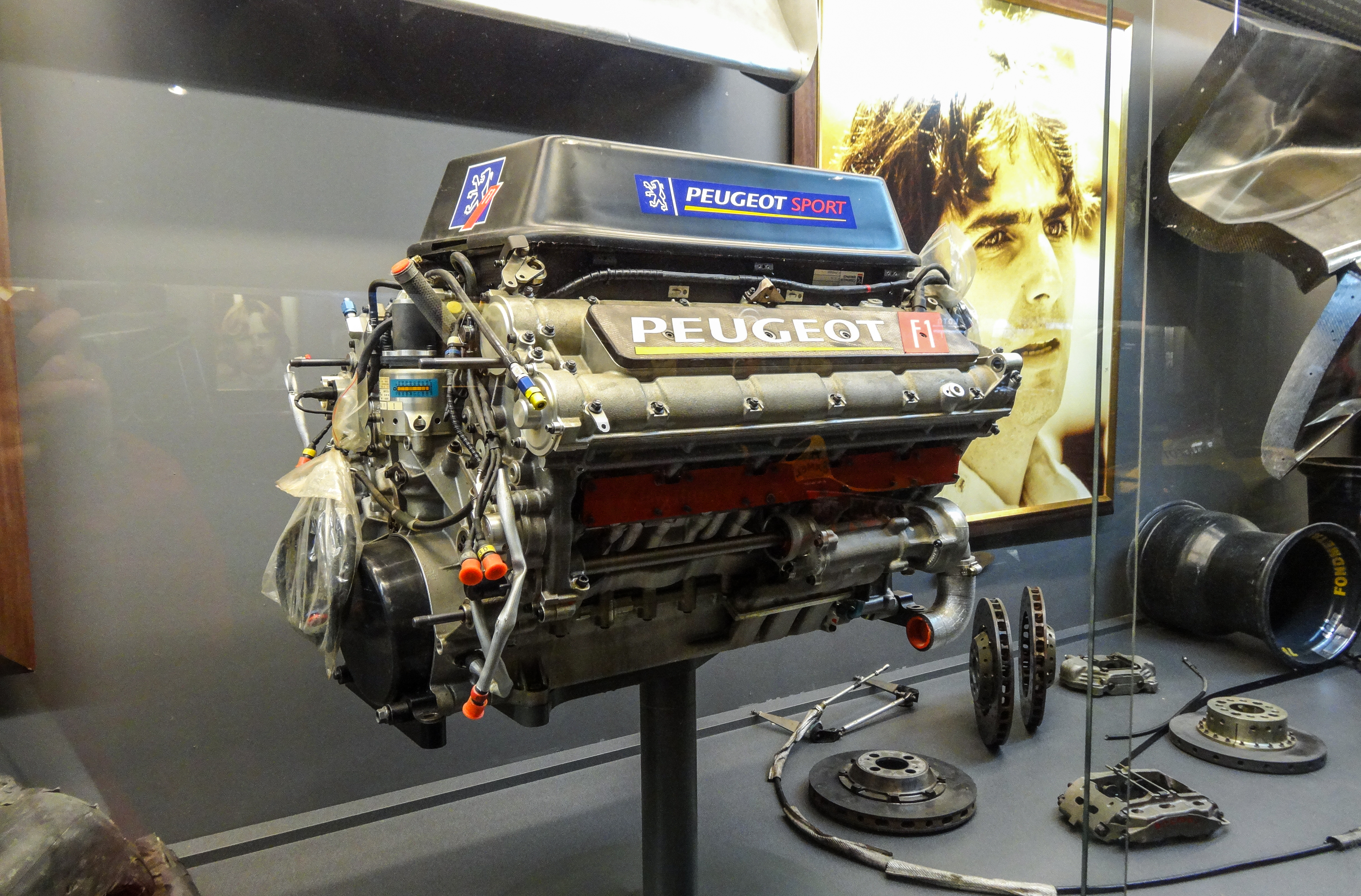

Overview
- Manufacturer: (France) Peugeot
- Production: 1990–2000

Layout
- Configuration: 80°-72° V10
- Displacement: 3.5 L (3,499 cc); 3.0 L (2,998 cc)
- Cylinder bore: 91 mm (3.6 in)
- Piston stroke: 53.8 mm (2.1 in); 46.1 mm (1.8 in)

Combustion
- Fuel system: Electronic fuel injection
- Fuel type: Gasoline
- Cooling system: Water-cooled

Output
- Power output: 650–800 PS (478–588 kW; 641–789 hp)
- Torque output: 260–359 lb⋅ft (353–487 N⋅m)

Dimensions
- Dry weight: 109–133 kg (240.3–293.2 lb)

The Peugeot V10 engine is a series of naturally-aspirated, V10, racing engines; produced between 1990 and 2000. These engines were used to compete in the World Sportscar Championship, between 1990 and 1993, with Peugeot winning the 24 Hours of Le Mans two years in a row (1992 and 1993). In 1994, they decided to make the switch to Formula One, using the same 3.5 L V10 derived from their highly successful, Le Mans-winning 905 Group C sports prototype, that was easily adjusted to F1 regulations. Peugeot debuted as an engine supplier with the McLaren team and remained in F1 until the end of the 2000 season.

== Peugeot 905 SA35-A1/SA35-A2 engine ==
Technically advanced, the 905 used a light alloy and high revving SA35-A1 3499 cc naturally aspirated V10 engine that was similar to F1 engines of the time. The 905 was built at Vélizy-Villacoublay

The more powerful SA35-A2 engine evolution, used in the 905B, made its race debut at the Nürburgring round of the 1991 series.

=== Specifications ===
Manufacturer
Peugeot
First race
1990
Category
Group C1
Engine
80° 3,499 cc (214 cu in) V10, 40 valves
Output
650 PS (478 kW; 641 hp) at 12,500 rpm (905B produced approximately 715 PS (526 kW; 705 bhp))
Transmission
6-speed sequential manual, mid-engine, rear-wheel-drive

== Formula One A4/A6 engine ==
Peugeot decided to switch to Formula One, using the same 3.5L V10 from the 905 that was easily adjusted to F1 regulations. In 1994, Peugeot debuted as an engine supplier with the McLaren team. The Peugeot A4 V10, used by the McLaren Formula One team in 1994, initially developed 700 PS (515 kW; 690 bhp) at 14,250 rpm. It was later further developed into the A6, which produced even more power; developing 760 PS (559 kW; 750 bhp) at 14,500 rpm. Peugeot remained in F1 until the end of the 2000 season, when, after little success, they decided to focus and concentrate their efforts on the World Rally Championship. Teams using Peugeot's V10 engine scored a total of 14 podium finishes, with 9 third places, and 5 second places, but never managed to win a race.

== Applications ==
=== Formula 1 cars ===
- McLaren MP4/9 (A4/A6)
- Jordan 195 (A10)
- Jordan 196 (A12)
- Jordan 197 (A14)
- Prost AP01 (A16)
- Prost AP02 (A18)
- Prost AP03 (A20)

=== Group C sports prototypes ===
- Peugeot 905 (SA35-A1/SA35-A2)

== See also ==
- Renault RS engine
- Yamaha F1 engine
- Ilmor 2175 engine
- Mercedes-Benz FO engine
- Hart 1035 engine
- Ferrari V10 engine
- Cosworth JD / VJ engine
- Petronas F1 engine
- Cosworth CR engine
- BMW E41 / P80 engine
- Honda V10 engine
