= Prost AP02 =

Formula One racing car

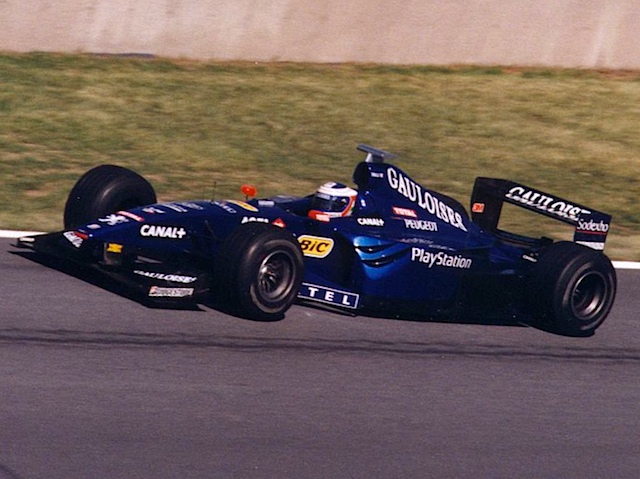
- Jarno Trulli driving the AP02 at the 1999 Canadian Grand Prix
- Category: Formula One
- Constructor: Prost
- Designers: Bernard Dudot (Technical Director); Loïc Bigois (Chief Engineer); Ben Wood (Head of Aerodynamics); John Barnard (Technical Consultant); Jean-Pierre Boudy (Engine Technical Director - Peugeot)
- Predecessor: AP01
- Successor: AP03

Technical specifications
- Chassis: Moulded carbon fibre composite structure
- Suspension (front): Double wishbones, pushrod
- Suspension (rear): Double wishbones, pushrod
- Engine: Peugeot A18, 3.0-litre 72-degree V10
- Transmission: Prost six-speed longitudinal sequential semi-automatic
- Power: 785 hp @ 15,700 rpm
- Fuel: Total
- Tyres: Bridgestone

Competition history
- Notable entrants: Gauloises Prost Peugeot
- Notable drivers: 18. (France) Olivier Panis; 19. (Italy) Jarno Trulli
- Debut: 1999 Australian Grand Prix
- Last event: 1999 Japanese Grand Prix
Races	Wins	Podiums	Poles	F/Laps
16	0	1	0	0
- Constructors' Championships: 0
- Drivers' Championships: 0

The Prost AP02 was the car with which the Prost Formula One team competed in the 1999 Formula One season. It was driven by Olivier Panis, in his sixth season with the team (including Ligier), and Jarno Trulli, in his second full season with the team.

After the team's dramatic slump in 1998, the 1999 season marked a small improvement in form. John Barnard, who had designed Prost's championship winning McLarens of the mid 1980s was brought in to help develop the car. The car showed flashes of promise, especially when Trulli scored his first podium finish at the wet 1999 European Grand Prix. The Italian moved to Jordan to replace the retiring Damon Hill in 2000, whilst Panis endured another frustrating year, often let down by reliability and left the team at the end of the season to join McLaren as a test driver.

The team finished 7th in the Constructors' Championship, with nine points.

The AP02 later became notable for being the first F1 car driven by future World Champion Jenson Button in an official test session, in December 1999.

== Sponsorship and livery ==
Prost used 'Gauloises' logos, except at the French, British and Belgian Grands Prix. Other sponsors including Canal+, Agfa-Gevaert, Total S.A., Bic, Alcatel Mobile, PlayStation and Sodexho.

== Complete Formula One results ==
(key) (results in bold indicate pole position)

Year	Team	Engine	Tyres	Drivers	1	2	3	4	5	6	7	8	9	10	11	12	13	14	15	16	Points	WCC
1999	Prost	Peugeot V10	**B**		AUS	BRA	SMR	MON	ESP	CAN	FRA	GBR	AUT	GER	HUN	BEL	ITA	EUR	MAL	JPN	**9**	**7th**
1999	Prost	Peugeot V10	**B**	Olivier Panis	Ret	6	Ret	Ret	Ret	9	8	13	10	6	10	13	11	9	Ret	Ret	**9**	**7th**
1999	Prost	Peugeot V10	**B**	Jarno Trulli	Ret	Ret	Ret	7	6	Ret	7	9	7	Ret	8	12	Ret	2	DNS	Ret	**9**	**7th**
