= Prost AP01 =

Formula One racing car

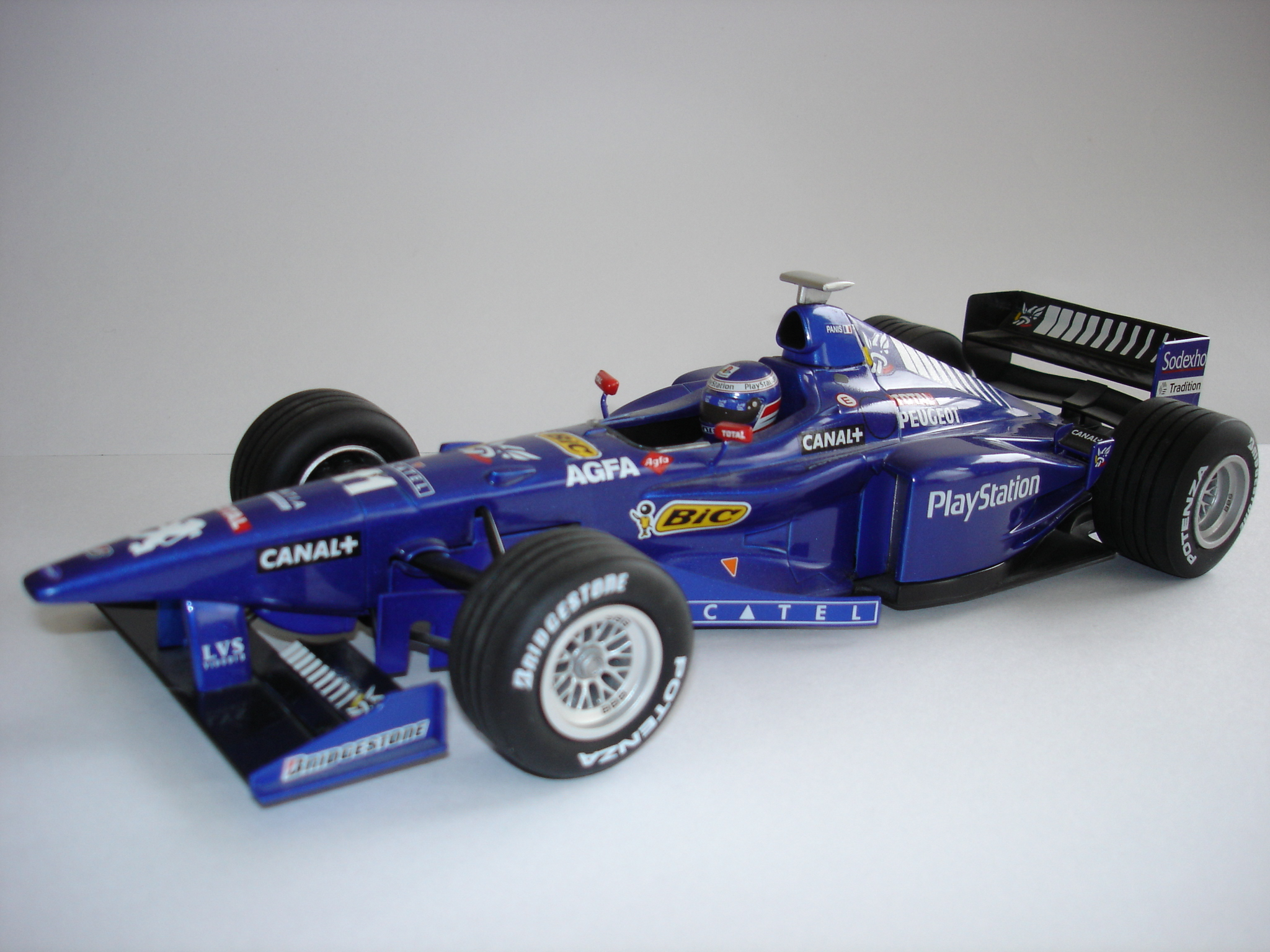
- A die-cast model of the AP01
- Category: Formula One
- Constructor: Prost
- Designers: Bernard Dudot (Technical Director); Loïc Bigois (Chief Engineer); George Ryton (Head of R&D); Ben Wood (Head of Aerodynamics); Jean-Pierre Boudy (Engine Technical Director - Peugeot)
- Predecessor: JS45
- Successor: AP02

Technical specifications
- Chassis: carbon-fibre and honeycomb composite structure
- Suspension (front): double wishbones, pushrod
- Suspension (rear): double wishbones, pushrod
- Engine: Peugeot A16 A16, 3.0-litre 72-degree V10
- Transmission: Prost six-speed longitudinal sequential semi-automatic
- Power: 765 hp (570 kW) @ 15,200 rpm
- Fuel: Total
- Tyres: Bridgestone

Competition history
- Notable entrants: Gauloises Prost Peugeot
- Notable drivers: 11. (France) Olivier Panis; 12. (Italy) Jarno Trulli
- Debut: 1998 Australian Grand Prix
- Last event: 1998 Japanese Grand Prix
Races	Wins	Poles	F/Laps
16	0	0	0
- Constructors' Championships: 0
- Drivers' Championships: 0

The Prost AP01 was the car with which the Prost team competed in the 1998 Formula One World Championship. It was driven by Frenchman Olivier Panis, who was in his fifth season with the team (including its time as Ligier), and Italian Jarno Trulli, who was in his first full season with Prost after deputising for the injured Panis for several races in 1997.

The AP01 was the first-ever Prost car to utilize Peugeot V10 engine factory works deal that started in 1998 season and thus earned direct factory support from Peugeot.

== Race history ==
After the good results of the previous season, 1998 was a disaster for Prost. The AP01's main weakness was its engine: it was unreliable and heavy, which prevented the team from finishing races, upset the balance of the car and meant that the team could not optimise the position of its ballast, as many of its rivals could. It was Jarno Trulli who first identified the balance problems with the rear end of the car. The AP01 had a major overhaul before the Canadian Grand Prix, with the rear suspension being completely revised. The team also scraped into the season by a narrow margin after the chassis failed the mandatory FIA crash test three times.

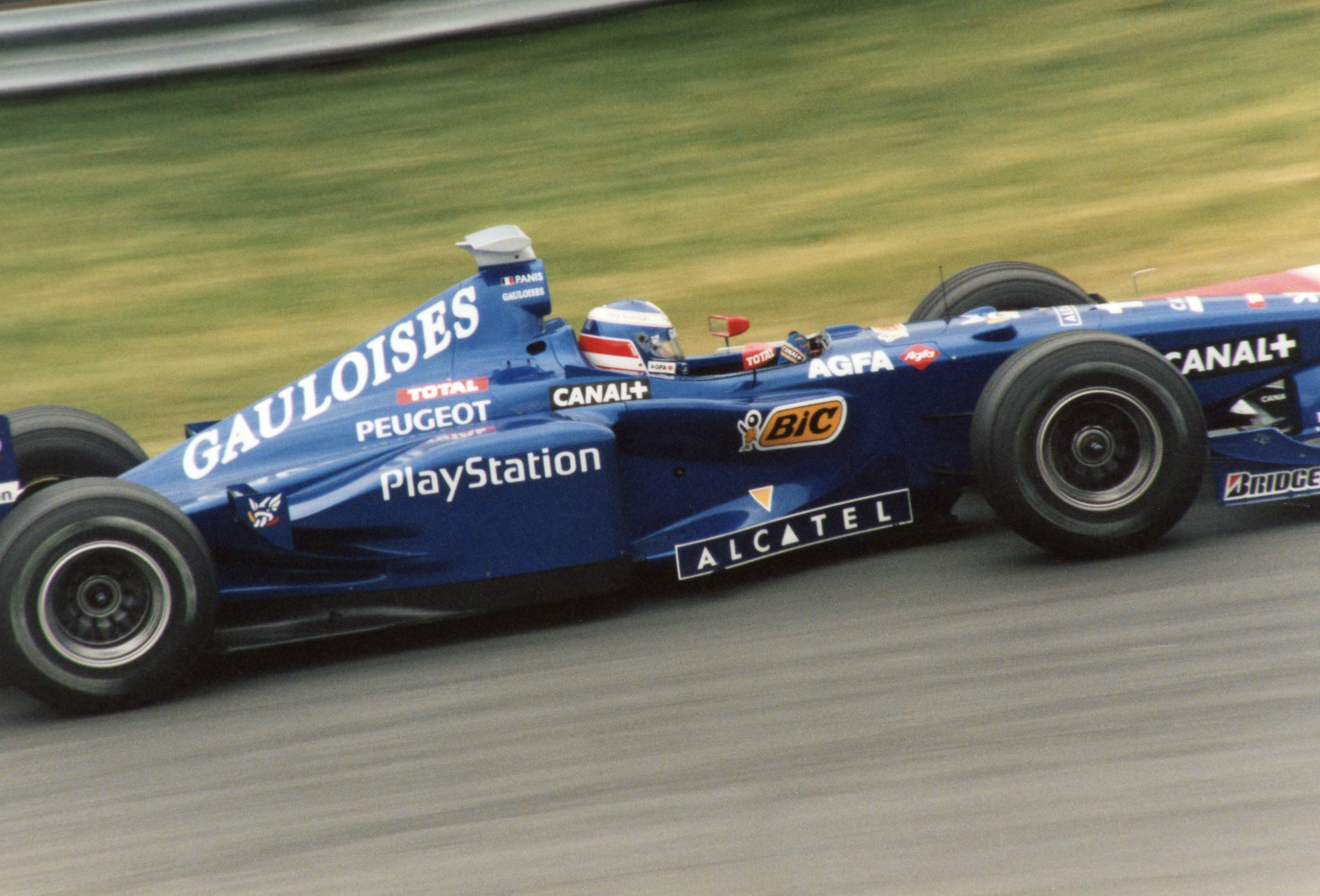
The Prost AP01 being driven by Olivier Panis at the 1998 Canadian Grand Prix.

With these problems allied with the relocation of the team's factory nearer Paris, the year turned into an exercise in damage limitation. A single point was scored for sixth place, at the chaotic 1998 Belgian Grand Prix, giving Prost 9th place in the Constructors' Championship. Only 8 cars finished the Belgian race with the two cars behind Trulli having spent so long in the pits being repaired their drivers were able to get out of the car for some time. In the final 6 laps, Trulli lost an entire lap to the front runners with engine problems but still managed to finish.

For the first few races, X-wings were used, but they were banned after the San Marino Grand Prix.

== Prost AP01B ==
The modified AP01B car got a new gearbox, a refurbished engine and the weight of the rear axle was reduced. The new car tested by Panis and Trulli at Magny-Cours and Barcelona in October. Trulli appeared for the first time in free practice and qualifying in Japan. The Italian didn't get a new car because he was the team's favorite driver, but because a coin toss decided in Trulli's favor. In qualifying, Trulli could only finish 14th and then asked the team management for permission to switch back to the old AP01, which was refused. In the warm-up, the car was damaged so badly after the accident that it was not ready for the race.

== Sponsorship and livery ==
The base color of the AP01 was the traditional dark blue with black and white accents on the rear and front wing. The team's main sponsor was the French cigarette brand Gauloises, with advertising spaces on the rear wing, airbox and front wing. On the rear side of the rear wing was the brand of the tire supplier Bridgestone on a white background. The Japanese electronics group Sony advertised its PlayStation games console on the side boxes, with the names of the engine manufacturer Peugeot and the fuel supplier Total directly above it. Other sponsors were 3M, Alcatel, BIC Group and Canal+.

Prost used 'Gauloises' logos, except at the French, British and German Grands Prix. For races with a tobacco advertising ban, the logo was replaced by white dashes.

== Complete Formula One results ==
(key) (results in bold indicate pole position)

Year	Team	Engine	Tyres	Drivers	1	2	3	4	5	6	7	8	9	10	11	12	13	14	15	16	Points	WCC
1998	Gauloises Prost Peugeot	Peugeot V10	**B**		AUS	BRA	ARG	SMR	ESP	MON	CAN	FRA	GBR	AUT	GER	HUN	BEL	ITA	LUX	JPN	1	9th
1998	Gauloises Prost Peugeot	Peugeot V10	**B**	(France) Olivier Panis	9	Ret	15	11	16	Ret	Ret	11	Ret	Ret	15	12	DNS	Ret	12	11	1	9th
1998	Gauloises Prost Peugeot	Peugeot V10	**B**	(Italy) Jarno Trulli	Ret	Ret	11	Ret	9	Ret	Ret	Ret	Ret	10	12	Ret	6	13	Ret	12	1	9th
