= Prost AP03 =

Formula One racing car

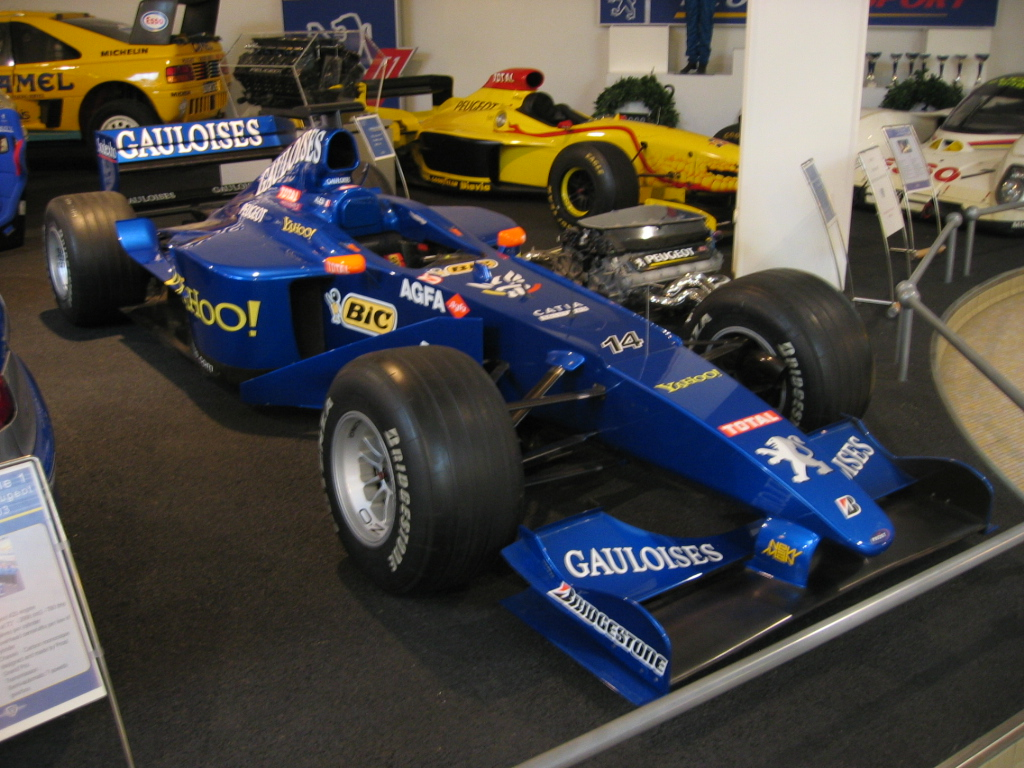
- The AP03 of Jean Alesi on display at the Musée de l'Aventure Peugeot
- Category: Formula One
- Constructor: Prost
- Designers: Alan Jenkins (Technical Director); Jean-Paul Gousset (Chief Designer); Loïc Bigois (Head of Aerodynamics); Jean-Pierre Boudy (Engine Technical Director - Peugeot)
- Predecessor: AP02
- Successor: AP04

Technical specifications
- Chassis: Moulded carbon-fibre composite structure
- Suspension (front): Double wishbones, pushrod
- Suspension (rear): Double wishbones, pushrod
- Engine: Peugeot A20, 3.0-litre 72-degree V10
- Transmission: Prost/Xtrac seven-speed longitudinal semi-automatic
- Power: 800 hp @ 16,200 rpm
- Fuel: Total
- Tyres: Bridgestone

Competition history
- Notable entrants: Gauloises Prost Peuegot
- Notable drivers: 14. (France) Jean Alesi; 15. (Germany) Nick Heidfeld
- Debut: 2000 Australian Grand Prix
- Last event: 2000 Malaysian Grand Prix
Races	Wins	Poles	F/Laps
17	0	0	0
- Constructors' Championships: 0
- Drivers' Championships: 0

The Prost AP03 was the car with which the Prost Formula One team competed in the 2000 Formula One season. It was driven by the experienced Jean Alesi, team boss Alain Prost's ex-Ferrari teammate, and reigning Formula 3000 champion Nick Heidfeld.

This was the last Formula One car to use Peugeot engines before the company withdrew from the sport. The engine technology itself however was bought by Asiatech and used for another two years, namely with Arrows in 2001 and with Minardi in 2002.

== Season summary ==
After the improvement from 1999 season, the year promised to contend for race victories but proved to be a disaster for the team. The cars were slow and unreliable, with only 11 out of 34 classified finishes recorded across the season. The team's relationship with Peugeot fell apart and all of the sponsors departed at the end of the season. The team ended up scoring no points, and were classified last in the Constructors' Championship behind Minardi, due to the Italian team's better finishing record. This meant that the team failed to receive any prize money for the season, and this, combined with the loss of their sponsors, plunged the team into serious financial trouble that would ultimately spell the beginning of the end for the outfit.

The problems became apparent during pre-season testing. Nick Heidfeld could not get a handle on the car and both drivers complained of inconsistent handling and lack of traction. Heidfeld also suffered the indignity of being disqualified after qualifying for the Nürburgring round after his car was found to be underweight and was not even allowed to take part in the race. Technical Director Alan Jenkins was fired after the Monaco race.

Prost blamed the apparently weak engine as the root cause of the AP03's uncompetitive performance. However, Peugeot retaliated with an uncharacteristic public revelation of the engine's output of 792 bhp, which was considered to be competitive at the time. Prost's criticism of Peugeot soured their relationship and combined with the lack of results, the latter withdrew from F1 as an engine supplier.

Alesi and Heidfeld were unable to make much of an impression, but the Frenchman managed to qualify eighth at Monaco and run fourth at Spa-Francorchamps before retiring. A poor pitstop in France was caught by the TV cameras with a visibly distraught Alain Prost shaking his head in despair. The teammates also collided on more than one occasion, most notably in Austria.

== Livery ==
This was the final year for the team being sponsored by Gauloises. Prost used 'Gauloises' logos, except at the British and French Grands Prix; which was replaced with white dashes. Yahoo! joined as one of the team's new main sponsors along with other retaining sponsors; Agfa-Gevaert, Total S.A., Bic, PlayStation and Sodexho.

== Complete Formula One results ==
(key) (results in bold indicate pole position)

Year	Team	Engine	Tyres	Drivers	1	2	3	4	5	6	7	8	9	10	11	12	13	14	15	16	17	Points	WCC
2000	Prost	Peugeot V10	**B**		AUS	BRA	SMR	GBR	ESP	EUR	MON	CAN	FRA	AUT	GER	HUN	BEL	ITA	USA	JPN	MAL	**0**	**NC**
2000	Prost	Peugeot V10	**B**	(France) Jean Alesi	Ret	Ret	Ret	10	Ret	9	Ret	Ret	14	Ret	Ret	Ret	Ret	12	Ret	Ret	11	**0**	**NC**
2000	Prost	Peugeot V10	**B**	(Germany) Nick Heidfeld	9	Ret	Ret	Ret	16	EX	8	Ret	12	Ret	12^{†}	Ret	Ret	Ret	9	Ret	Ret	**0**	**NC**
