= Phoenix Finance =

British banking company

- Founder(s): Charles Nickerson

Formula One World Championship career
- Races entered: 0
- Constructors' Championships: 0
- Drivers' Championships: 0
- Race victories: 0
- Podiums: 0
- Points: 0
- Pole positions: 0
- Fastest laps: 0

Phoenix Finance (otherwise known as DART Grand Prix) was a British banking company which attempted to enter the 2002 and 2003 Formula One seasons. Charles Nickerson was managing director of the company.

== History ==
Phoenix Finance bought some of the remains of Prost Grand Prix, outbidding Paul Stoddart of Minardi, shortly before the 2002 Australian Grand Prix. The team hoped to enter Formula One at the next round, the Malaysian Grand Prix. The team planned to use the 2001-spec Prost AP04 chassis with Hart designed Arrows V10 engines from 1998. Tom Walkinshaw boss of the Arrows team had planned to give the new team assistance. Craig Pollock was rumoured to be the new team principal.

However their entry to the championship instantly hit problems as to whether Phoenix were Prost under a new name or a new team with some of Prost's old assets. Their entry was rejected by the Fédération Internationale de l'Automobile (FIA) because the team did not buy Prost Grand Prix completely, thus making them a new team. As they were a new team, they were required to pay a $48 Million fee to the FIA in order to enter F1. As they had not done that, they were refused entry into the sport. F1 supremo Bernie Ecclestone claimed of Charles Nickerson at the time that "He has bought nothing in Formula One. All he has bought is some show-off cars". Phoenix also claimed that along with several other assets, they had also bought the Prost entry into Formula One, which in their view, meant that they did not have to pay the $48 Million fee to the FIA. The FIA later rejected this claim and ruled that team entries could not be bought or sold. Minardi owner Stoddart spent over $350,000 in legal work to ensure Phoenix would not line up on the grid, as a preservation to his team's cut of funding.

Phoenix did appear at Sepang for the 2002 Malaysian Grand Prix. They had the former Minardi drivers, Tarso Marques and Gastón Mazzacane, who had also driven for Prost in 2001. The team had a skeleton crew of mechanics supplied by Tom Walkinshaw, two Prost AP04 cars fitted with TWR V10 engines used by Arrows in 1999, and their two drivers. Phoenix planned to race but were barred by officials. In the days after their failed attempt to race, Nickerson released documents from French liquidators claiming their acquisition of Prost would allow entry to the 2002 season to FIA president Max Mosley. However their entry was further denied, leading Phoenix Finance taking the FIA to the High Court in London. The court backed the FIA's ruling that team entries could not be bought or sold.

== Phoenix AP04B ==
The Phoenix AP04B was an adapted version of the Prost cars Phoenix Finance had purchased. There were rumours of tyre supply from Avon after Michelin and Bridgestone both declined. When the team arrived in Malaysia, the cars were fitted with 1999 spec Hart V10s from TWR. The rear of the AP04B was adapted using parts from the Arrows AX3 three-seater Formula One car.
