= Prost Grand Prix =

French auto racing team

Coordinates: 48°47′1″N 2°4′2″E

Prost
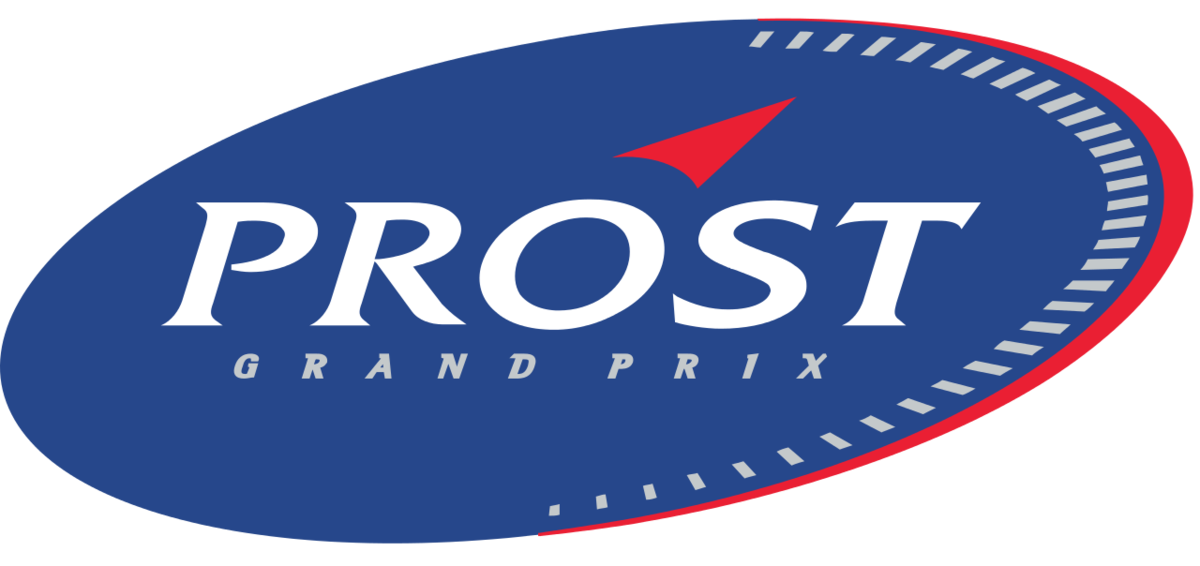
- Full name: Prost Gauloises Blondes (1997); Gauloises Prost Peugeot (1998–2000); Prost Acer (2001)
- Base: Guyancourt, Yvelines, France
- Founder(s): Alain Prost
- Noted staff: Bernard Dudot; John Barnard; Loïc Bigois
- Noted drivers: (France) Olivier Panis (Italy) Jarno Trulli (France) Jean Alesi (Germany) Nick Heidfeld (Germany) Heinz-Harald Frentzen (Japan) Shinji Nakano (Czech Republic) Tomáš Enge
- Previous name: Équipe Ligier

Formula One World Championship career
- First entry: 1997 Australian Grand Prix
- Races entered: 83
- Constructors' Championships: 0 (best finish: 6th, 1997)
- Drivers' Championships: 0
- Race victories: 0 (best finish: 2nd, 1997 Spanish Grand Prix and 1999 European Grand Prix)
- Podiums: 3
- Pole positions: 0
- Fastest laps: 0
- Final entry: 2001 Japanese Grand Prix

Prost Grand Prix was a Formula One racing team owned and managed by four-time Formula One world champion Alain Prost. The team participated in five seasons from 1997 to 2001.

The team was the last French Formula One team based in France, in Yvelines (in the surroundings of Paris).

== History ==
=== Purchase of Ligier ===
As early as 1992, Alain Prost had ambitions to buy the Ligier team, and had tested their 1992 car incognito, wearing Érik Comas's crash helmet, with a view to being a driver-owner, even setting competitive lap times. Ligier was being supplied with Elf lubricants and Renault engines at the time, and the French manufacturers had strong ties with Prost. They were pushing to keep him in F1 after his sacking by Ferrari at the end of 1991. Prost wanted to bring John Barnard, who had designed his title winning McLaren cars in 1985 and 1986 on board as part of the package. The deal fell through just before the season opening race in South Africa however, and Prost sat the season out before joining the similarly Renault powered Williams team for 1993, and won his fourth world championship before his retirement from racing.

In the meantime, Ligier was bought instead by Cyril Bourlon de Rouvre. The team enjoyed an upswing in fortunes under his ownership and went on to be reasonably competitive in the mid 1990s.

De Rouvre then sold up to Benetton bosses Flavio Briatore and Tom Walkinshaw in early 1994 after being convicted for fraud. Briatore saw this deal as a way to gain access to the Renault engines for Benetton, which at the time were the dominant engines in F1. Briatore placed Walkinshaw at Ligier as team boss, but he walked away and bought Arrows after a disagreement with the Italian, taking chief designer Frank Dernie with him. Briatore replaced Walkinshaw with Cesare Fiorio and the team went on to win the 1996 Monaco Grand Prix with Olivier Panis, in what turned out to be the last win for Ligier.

Prost completed the purchase of the Ligier team in February 1997 after several months of speculation. The new owner immediately changed the name to Prost and elected to retain Fiorio, who had previously been Prost's boss during the Frenchman's tenure at Ferrari. An exclusive contract for full-factory works Peugeot engines was announced for 1998, but the team continued with Ligier's planned Mugen-Honda engines for 1997. As there was no time before the season started to design and build a new car, the team simply used the Ligier JS45 designed by Loïc Bigois and renamed it the Prost JS45.

=== Early promise ===
The season started strongly. Olivier Panis lay third in the championship early in the season aided by podium finishes in Brazil (third) and Spain (second). Form seemed to be on Panis' side, but the Frenchman crashed heavily at high speed in Canada, breaking both his legs.

With its lead driver forced to miss much of the season, Prost struggled with novices Jarno Trulli and Shinji Nakano until Panis's return at the Luxembourg Grand Prix. There were glimpses, a commanding drive by Trulli in Austria where he led for much of the race before his engine expired, and a run by Trulli again to fourth at Germany showed potential, and a dogged points finish for Panis on his return in Luxembourg meant that Prost wasted no time in signing the pair up for a further season.

1997 world champion Jacques Villeneuve later remarked that in the year of his title victory, he had regarded Panis as something of a threat. Panis had been fastest in Spain, and was running right behind Villeneuve in Argentina when his car gave up on him. He was close to winning in Canada too as his Bridgestone tyres were better equipped than the Goodyear tyred cars around him.

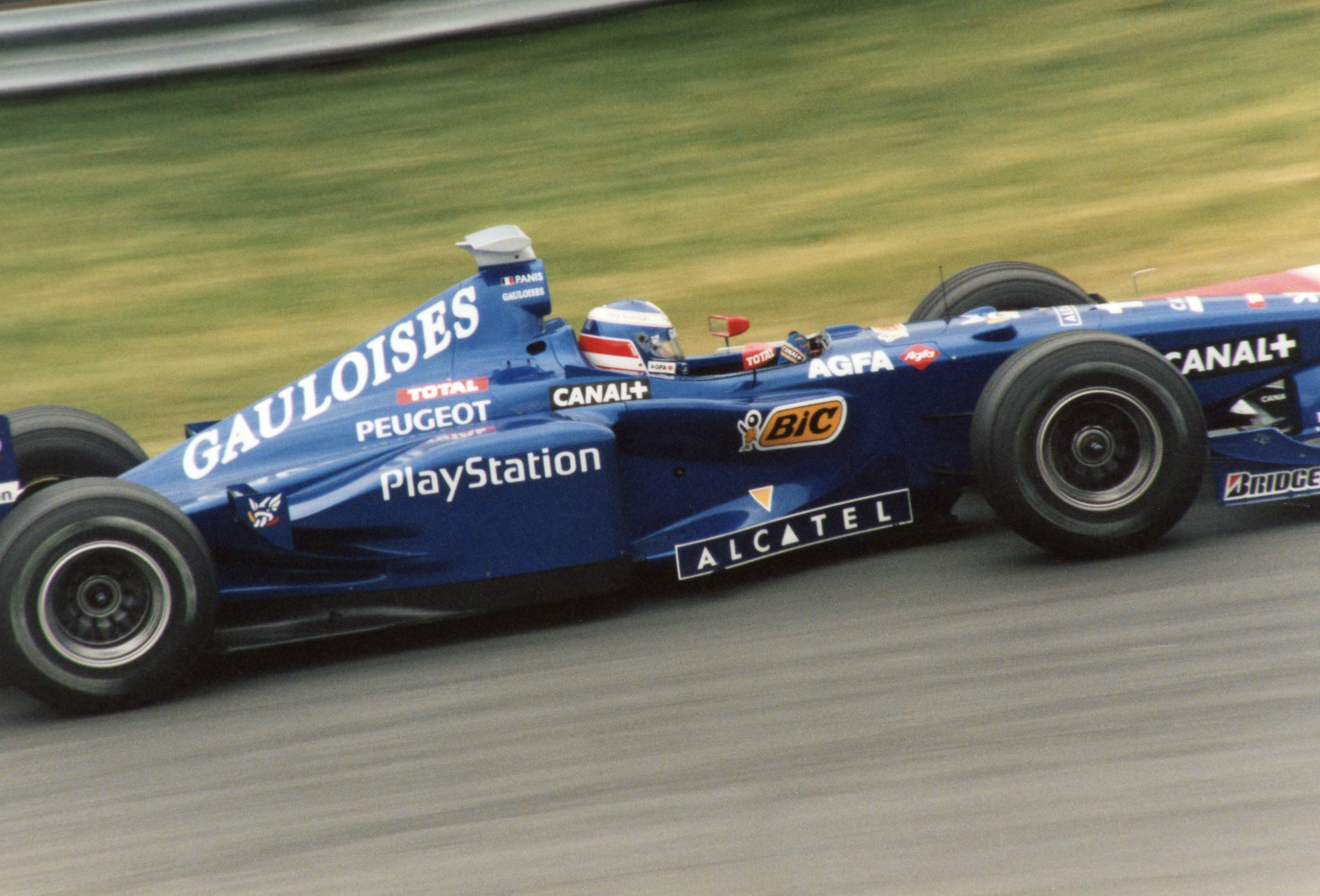
Olivier Panis driving for the Prost Grand Prix team in Montreal in 1998.

=== Problems and decline ===
After such a promising 1997, hopes were high for the partnership with Peugeot as this was an attempt at becoming an all-French powerhouse and thus Prost earned Peugeot's direct factory support. It was established just a few days before the partnership was made official that Peugeot had changed the terms of their agreement with Prost meaning they had to pay Peugeot for the engines over a period of three seasons rather than receiving them for free over a period of five seasons; this left Prost with little to no choice but to agree to the new terms as it would have left them with little to no time to find a new engine supplier, with potential flow-on ramifications of key sponsors pulling out, things took a turn for the worse in the following seasons. After serious gearbox problems in testing, the team almost did not start the 1998 season-opener as their car still had to pass a crash-test. They made it to the Australian Grand Prix, but the season proved to be a failure. Only Trulli's sixth at Spa kept the team from last in the standings. In the first few races of 1998, the team also ran with X-wings until these were banned on safety grounds.

The 1999 season saw an improvement. John Barnard was hired as technical consultant. Several points finishes were achieved and a second place coming by way of Trulli's strong drive at the Nürburgring. At times the car looked genuinely competitive with strong qualifying displays. Yet the results often failed to materialise. At Magny-Cours Panis had started third, but was unable to capitalise and finished outside the points. Trulli was under contract for 2000, but the team's relative lack of success enabled him to leave for Jordan. Panis was dropped and went on to become McLaren's tester.

=== Struggle for survival ===
In 2000 the team began its sharp decline. Veteran racer Jean Alesi, Prost's former teammate at Ferrari in 1991, was signed to the team. The team also signed up rookie F3000 champion Nick Heidfeld for 2000.

Despite a promising driver lineup and aiming for possible Grand Prix victories, Prost finished last in the Constructors Championship, failing to score a single point during the season. Heidfeld was disqualified from the European Grand Prix at the Nürburgring for his car being two kilos underweight. Prost fired Alan Jenkins, the car's designer after Monaco. At the Austrian Grand Prix their two drivers crashed into each other, putting them both out of the race. The relationship between Prost and Peugeot collapsed.

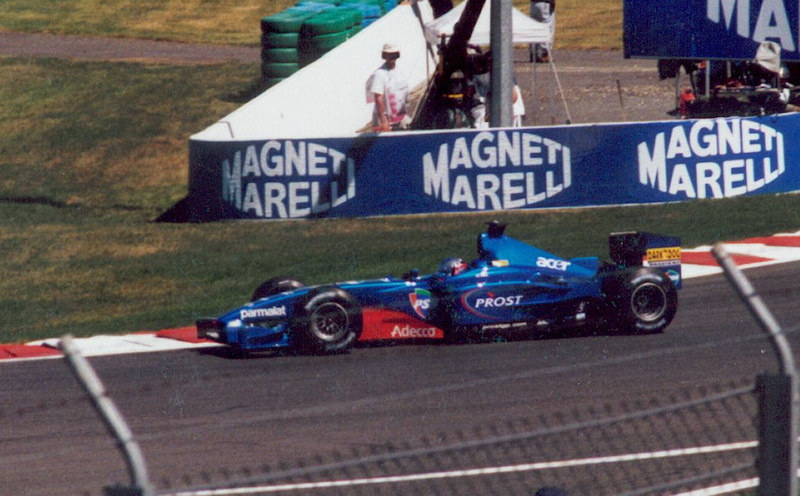
Jean Alesi driving for Prost during 2001.

In 2001 the cars now ran with Acer-badged Ferrari engines. The season began with Alesi and ex-Minardi driver Gastón Mazzacane, but after four races, the latter was dropped from the team and replaced by Jaguar's Luciano Burti, who himself was replaced at Jaguar by Pedro de la Rosa. Alesi was very consistent, finishing every race, occasionally in points scoring positions, most notably in Canada when he did a few donuts afterwards and after getting out of the car, threw his helmet into the crowd. It was his best finish with the team. A fallout after the British Grand Prix, however, saw Alesi walk out after the German Grand Prix. For his final race with Prost, Alesi scored another championship point in that race of attrition. The first start for the race was red-flagged when Burti was launched into the air after crashing at high speed into the back of Michael Schumacher's ailing Ferrari just seconds off the line. Alesi moved to Jordan Grand Prix for the rest of the year, and was replaced at Prost by Heinz-Harald Frentzen, who himself had been sacked from Jordan after Silverstone.

In Belgium, Frentzen qualified a surprising fourth on the grid after getting his first and only dry lap right in drying conditions, but threw it away when he stalled on the initial formation lap, the first of three red flags. The third one saw a long delay after a huge crash at the fastest part of the circuit involving Burti and Eddie Irvine's Jaguar. Burti was transported away from the circuit by helicopter and taken away for medical observation. At Monza, F3000 driver Tomáš Enge became the fifth driver to drive for the team in 2001. There would be no more points that year.

At the end of the season, speculation began surrounding the fate of the team in the light of its increasing debts. Finally, in early 2002 the team went bankrupt, just before the start of the season. Prost had been unable to raise enough sponsorship to keep the team afloat. Deeply hurt by the episode, Prost described it as a disaster for France. Frentzen had hoped to stay, but ended up at Arrows. The team never managed to replace the money that Gauloises stopped supplying when they withdrew their title sponsorship at the end of 2000.

Reflecting back on the experience, Alain Prost stated that Prost Grand Prix was his biggest mistake.

== Phoenix Finance's failed F1 entry ==
A consortium fronted by Phoenix Finance – run by Charles Nickerson, a friend of Arrows' Tom Walkinshaw – purchased the team's assets, believing that together with their purchase of old Arrows assets, specifically the engines, it would gain them entry for the 2002 season. However, the FIA viewed the consortium as a new entry (subject to an entry fee) and the project did not go ahead.

== Complete Formula One results ==
(key)

| Year | Chassis | Engine | Tyres | Drivers | 1 | 2 | 3 | 4 | 5 | 6 | 7 | 8 | 9 | 10 | 11 | 12 | 13 | 14 | 15 | 16 | 17 | Points | WCC |
|---|---|---|---|---|---|---|---|---|---|---|---|---|---|---|---|---|---|---|---|---|---|---|---|
| 1997 | JS45 | Mugen-Honda MF-301HB 3.0 V10 | B | | AUS | BRA | ARG | SMR | MON | ESP | CAN | FRA | GBR | GER | HUN | BEL | ITA | AUT | LUX | JPN | EUR | 21 | 6th |
| 1997 | JS45 | Mugen-Honda MF-301HB 3.0 V10 | B | (France) Olivier Panis | 5 | 3 | Ret | 8 | 4 | 2 | 11^{†} | | | | | | | | 6 | Ret | 7 | 21 | 6th |
| 1997 | JS45 | Mugen-Honda MF-301HB 3.0 V10 | B | (Italy) Jarno Trulli | | | | | | | | 10 | 8 | 4 | 7 | 15 | 10 | Ret | | | | 21 | 6th |
| 1997 | JS45 | Mugen-Honda MF-301HB 3.0 V10 | B | (Japan) Shinji Nakano | 7 | 14 | Ret | Ret | Ret | Ret | 6 | Ret | 11^{†} | 7 | 6 | Ret | 11 | Ret | Ret | Ret | 10 | 21 | 6th |
| 1998 | AP01 | Peugeot A16 3.0 V10 | B | | AUS | BRA | ARG | SMR | ESP | MON | CAN | FRA | GBR | AUT | GER | HUN | BEL | ITA | LUX | JPN | | 1 | 9th |
| 1998 | AP01 | Peugeot A16 3.0 V10 | B | (France) Olivier Panis | 9 | Ret | 15^{†} | 11^{†} | 16^{†} | Ret | Ret | 11 | Ret | Ret | 15 | 12 | DNS | Ret | 12 | 11 | | 1 | 9th |
| 1998 | AP01 | Peugeot A16 3.0 V10 | B | (Italy) Jarno Trulli | Ret | Ret | 11 | Ret | 9 | Ret | Ret | Ret | Ret | 10 | 12 | Ret | 6 | 13 | Ret | 12^{†} | | 1 | 9th |
| 1999 | AP02 | Peugeot A18 3.0 V10 | B | | AUS | BRA | SMR | MON | ESP | CAN | FRA | GBR | AUT | GER | HUN | BEL | ITA | EUR | MAL | JPN | | 9 | 7th |
| 1999 | AP02 | Peugeot A18 3.0 V10 | B | (France) Olivier Panis | Ret | 6 | Ret | Ret | Ret | 9 | 8 | 13 | 10 | 6 | 10 | 13 | 11^{†} | 9 | Ret | Ret | | 9 | 7th |
| 1999 | AP02 | Peugeot A18 3.0 V10 | B | (Italy) Jarno Trulli | Ret | Ret | Ret | 7 | 6 | Ret | 7 | 9 | 7 | Ret | 8 | 12 | Ret | 2 | Ret | Ret | | 9 | 7th |
| 2000 | AP03 | Peugeot A20 3.0 V10 | B | | AUS | BRA | SMR | GBR | ESP | EUR | MON | CAN | FRA | AUT | GER | HUN | BEL | ITA | USA | JPN | MAL | 0 | NC |
| 2000 | AP03 | Peugeot A20 3.0 V10 | B | (France) Jean Alesi | Ret | Ret | Ret | 10 | Ret | 9 | Ret | Ret | 14 | Ret | Ret | Ret | Ret | 12 | Ret | Ret | 11 | 0 | NC |
| 2000 | AP03 | Peugeot A20 3.0 V10 | B | (Germany) Nick Heidfeld | 9 | Ret | Ret | Ret | 16 | EX | 8 | Ret | 12 | Ret | 12^{†} | Ret | Ret | Ret | 9 | Ret | Ret | 0 | NC |
| 2001 | AP04 | Acer 01A 3.0 V10 | M | | AUS | MAL | BRA | SMR | ESP | AUT | MON | CAN | EUR | FRA | GBR | GER | HUN | BEL | ITA | USA | JPN | 4 | 9th |
| 2001 | AP04 | Acer 01A 3.0 V10 | M | (France) Jean Alesi | 9 | 9 | 8 | 9 | 10 | 10 | 6 | 5 | 15 | 12 | 11 | 6 | | | | | | 4 | 9th |
| 2001 | AP04 | Acer 01A 3.0 V10 | M | (Germany) Heinz-Harald Frentzen | | | | | | | | | | | | | Ret | 9 | Ret | 10 | 12 | 4 | 9th |
| 2001 | AP04 | Acer 01A 3.0 V10 | M | (Argentina) Gastón Mazzacane | Ret | 12 | Ret | Ret | | | | | | | | | | | | | | 4 | 9th |
| 2001 | AP04 | Acer 01A 3.0 V10 | M | (Brazil) Luciano Burti | | | | | 11 | 11 | Ret | 8 | 12 | 10 | Ret | Ret | Ret | DNS | | | | 4 | 9th |
| 2001 | AP04 | Acer 01A 3.0 V10 | M | (Czech Republic) Tomáš Enge | | | | | | | | | | | | | | | 12 | 14 | Ret | 4 | 9th |
