= 2000 Formula One World Championship =

54th season of FIA Formula One motor racing

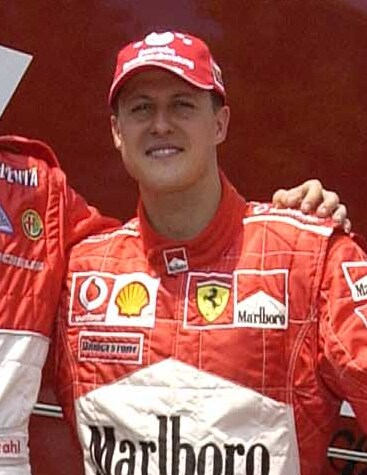
Michael Schumacher (pictured in 2003) won his third championship, and his first for Ferrari, in 2000. This title started the streak of his five championships in a row.

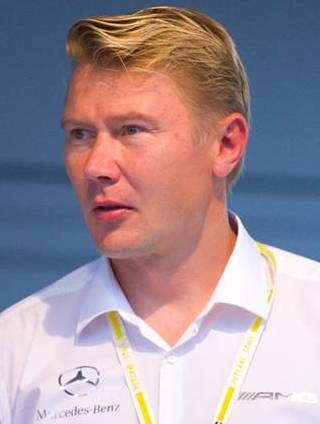
Defending double world champion Mika Häkkinen (pictured in 2009) finished runner-up 19 points behind Schumacher.

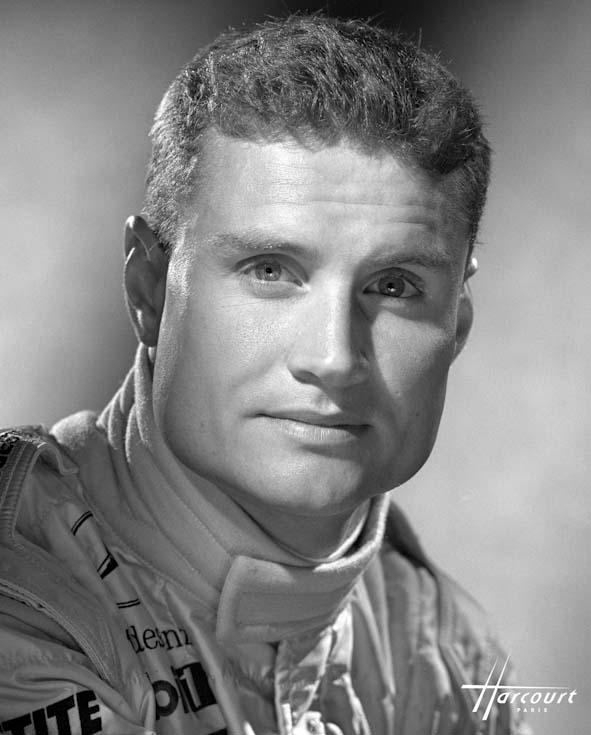
Häkkinen's teammate, David Coulthard (pictured in 1999), finished the season ranked third.

The 2000 FIA Formula One World Championship was the 54th season of FIA Formula One motor racing. It commenced on 12 March and ended on 22 October after seventeen races. Michael Schumacher became Ferrari's first World Drivers' Champion in 21 years, having clinched the Drivers' title at the penultimate race of the season. Ferrari successfully defended its Constructors' title. This season marked the first for future world champion Jenson Button.

For the third year in succession, the season featured a close battle between Ferrari and McLaren. Schumacher won the first three races and dominated the first part of the season as McLaren had reliability issues. Then misfortune struck Schumacher, who retired from three consecutive races with both Mika Häkkinen and David Coulthard scoring big. Häkkinen then surged to win two races in a row, leaving him six points clear of Schumacher who faced a fifth consecutive season at Ferrari without titles since 1996. Schumacher fought back winning the final four races of the season in convincing fashion, recording pole position on all those occasions. The title was sealed in Japan on 8 October, after a classic straight fight between Schumacher and Häkkinen, with Schumacher passing Häkkinen at the final pit stop and then holding out in front.

The season held the record for the smallest number of drivers competing in a single season with only one driver change (Luciano Burti deputising for an ill Eddie Irvine in Austria) putting the total at 23 (similar to 2002 season). This record stood until 2008, where there were no driver changes, although the Super Aguri F1 team withdrew in the middle of that season. Away from the front runners, following a largely unsuccessful foray into Formula One, Peugeot officially ended their involvement in the sport as an engine supplier at the end of 2000, having failed to win a Grand Prix since they entered F1 in an engine supply capacity in 1994 having supplied McLaren, Jordan and Prost. Their final season in 2000 as an official manufacturer in partnership with Prost would vindicate this withdrawal decision with the Prost-Peugeot combination failing to muster a single point all season. However, their engine assets would be purchased by Asia Motor Technologies France and continue to be used under the Asiatech name for the 2001 and 2002 seasons.

== Teams and drivers ==
The following teams and drivers competed in the 2000 FIA Formula One World Championship. All teams competed with tyres supplied by Bridgestone.

Entrant	Constructor	Chassis	Engine^{†}	No.	Driver	Rounds
(United Kingdom) West McLaren Mercedes	McLaren-Mercedes	MP4/15	Mercedes FO110J	1	(Finland) Mika Häkkinen	All
(United Kingdom) West McLaren Mercedes	McLaren-Mercedes	MP4/15	Mercedes FO110J	2	(United Kingdom) David Coulthard	All
(Italy) Scuderia Ferrari Marlboro	Ferrari	F1-2000	Ferrari Tipo 049	3	(Germany) Michael Schumacher	All
(Italy) Scuderia Ferrari Marlboro	Ferrari	F1-2000	Ferrari Tipo 049	4	(Brazil) Rubens Barrichello	All
(Republic of Ireland) Benson & Hedges Jordan	Jordan-Mugen-Honda	EJ10; EJ10B	Mugen-Honda MF-301 HE	5	(Germany) Heinz-Harald Frentzen	All
(Republic of Ireland) Benson & Hedges Jordan	Jordan-Mugen-Honda	EJ10; EJ10B	Mugen-Honda MF-301 HE	6	(Italy) Jarno Trulli	All
(United Kingdom) HSBC Jaguar Racing F1 Team	Jaguar-Cosworth	R1	Cosworth CR-2	7	(United Kingdom) Eddie Irvine (Note: Eddie Irvine was entered into the Austrian Grand Prix, but later withdrew due to illness.)	All
(United Kingdom) HSBC Jaguar Racing F1 Team	Jaguar-Cosworth	R1	Cosworth CR-2	7	(Brazil) Luciano Burti	10
(United Kingdom) HSBC Jaguar Racing F1 Team	Jaguar-Cosworth	R1	Cosworth CR-2	8	(United Kingdom) Johnny Herbert	All
(United Kingdom) BMW WilliamsF1 Team	Williams-BMW	FW22	BMW E41/4	9	(Germany) Ralf Schumacher	All
(United Kingdom) BMW WilliamsF1 Team	Williams-BMW	FW22	BMW E41/4	10	(United Kingdom) Jenson Button	All
(Italy) Mild Seven Benetton Playlife	Benetton-Playlife	B200	Playlife FB02	11	(Italy) Giancarlo Fisichella	All
(Italy) Mild Seven Benetton Playlife	Benetton-Playlife	B200	Playlife FB02	12	(Austria) Alexander Wurz	All
(France) Gauloises Prost Peugeot	Prost-Peugeot	AP03	Peugeot A20	14	(France) Jean Alesi	All
(France) Gauloises Prost Peugeot	Prost-Peugeot	AP03	Peugeot A20	15	(Germany) Nick Heidfeld	All
(Switzerland) Red Bull Sauber Petronas	Sauber-Petronas	C19	Petronas SPE 04A	16	(Brazil) Pedro Diniz	All
(Switzerland) Red Bull Sauber Petronas	Sauber-Petronas	C19	Petronas SPE 04A	17	(Finland) Mika Salo	All
(United Kingdom) Arrows F1 Team	Arrows-Supertec	A21	Supertec FB02	18	(Spain) Pedro de la Rosa	All
(United Kingdom) Arrows F1 Team	Arrows-Supertec	A21	Supertec FB02	19	(Netherlands) Jos Verstappen	All
(Italy) Telefónica Minardi Fondmetal	Minardi-Fondmetal	M02	Fondmetal RV10	20	(Spain) Marc Gené	All
(Italy) Telefónica Minardi Fondmetal	Minardi-Fondmetal	M02	Fondmetal RV10	21	(Argentina) Gastón Mazzacane	All
(United Kingdom) Lucky Strike Reynard BAR Honda	BAR-Honda	002	Honda RA000E	22	(Canada) Jacques Villeneuve	All
(United Kingdom) Lucky Strike Reynard BAR Honda	BAR-Honda	002	Honda RA000E	23	(Brazil) Ricardo Zonta	All

^{†} All engines were 3.0 litre, V10 configuration.

=== Team changes ===
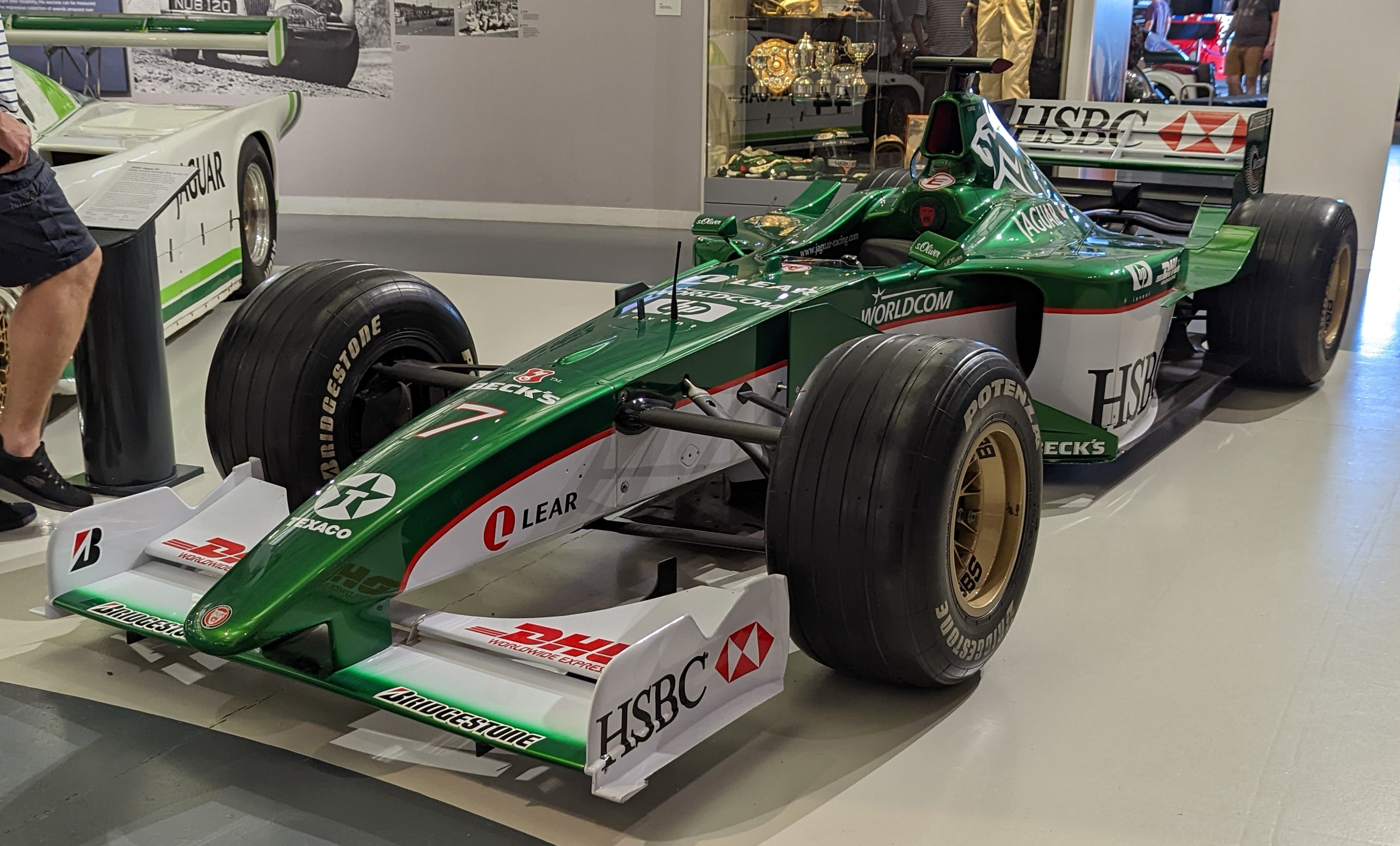
Jaguar Racing's first car, the R1

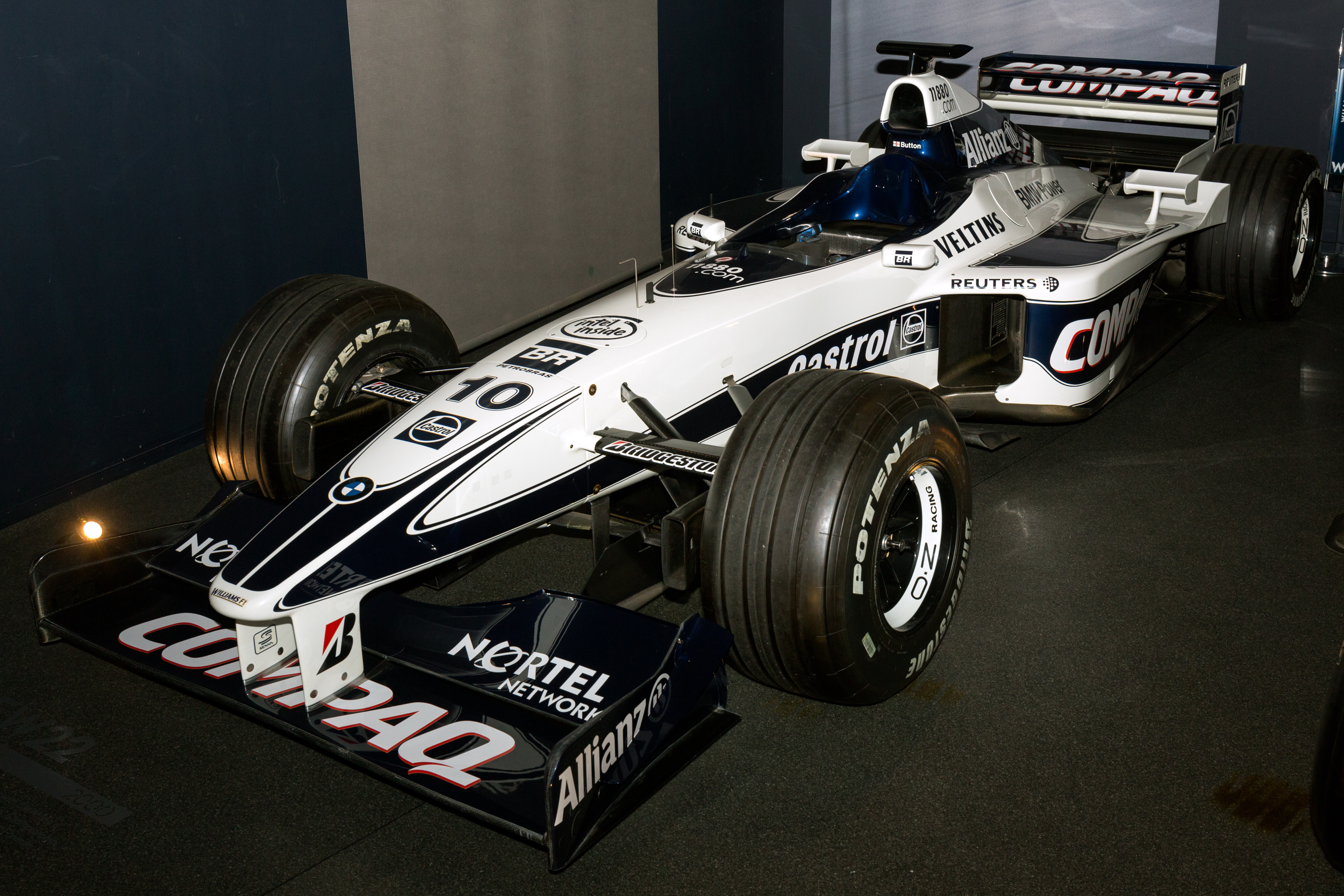
BMW returned to Formula 1 in collaboration with Williams.

- After being bought by Ford, the Stewart team was renamed Jaguar Racing, with the team's engines rebadged as Cosworths. The Ford V10s used by Minardi in 1998 were rebadged as Fondmetal engines, in deference to Gabriele Rumi's financial input to the team, and the car's main colour was changed from blue and silver to a fluorescent yellow. The Ford name, present on the Formula One grid since the debut of the Ford Cosworth DFV in 1967, was therefore absent for the 2000 season, although it made a brief return in 2003 and 2004.
- Williams switched to BMW engines, replacing the Supertec units of the previous season. The contract, which had been signed back in 1998, marked BMW's return to Formula One after over a decade of absence. BAR, who had also used Supertecs in 1999, signed a deal with Honda to use their engines for the 2000 season. Honda's previous stint as an engine supplier had ended in 1992, when their highly successful collaboration with McLaren came to a conclusion.
- Following the departure of engine designer Brian Hart, who had been responsible for the team's Hart, Yamaha and Arrows engines, the Arrows team switched to Supertec engines for 2000.

=== Driver changes ===
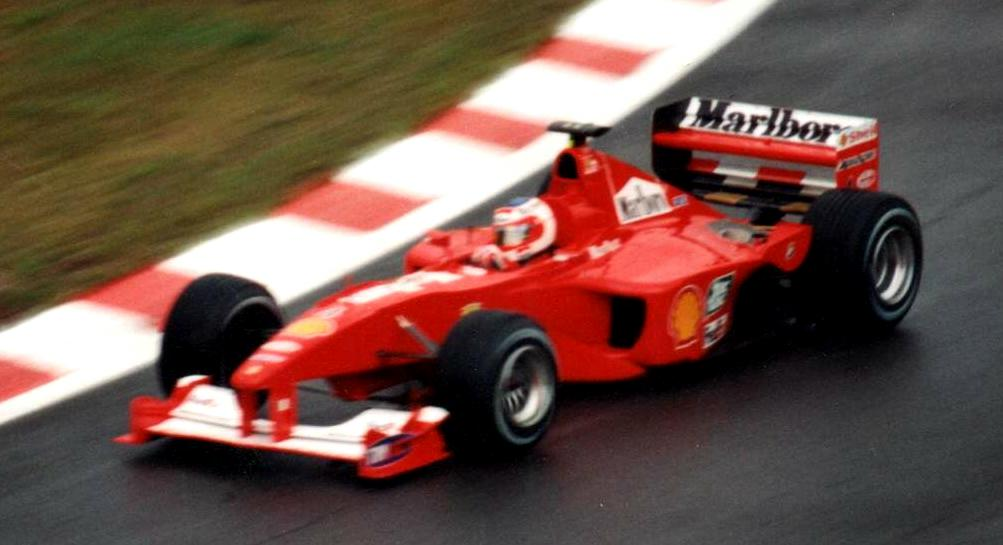
Rubens Barrichello joined Scuderia Ferrari.

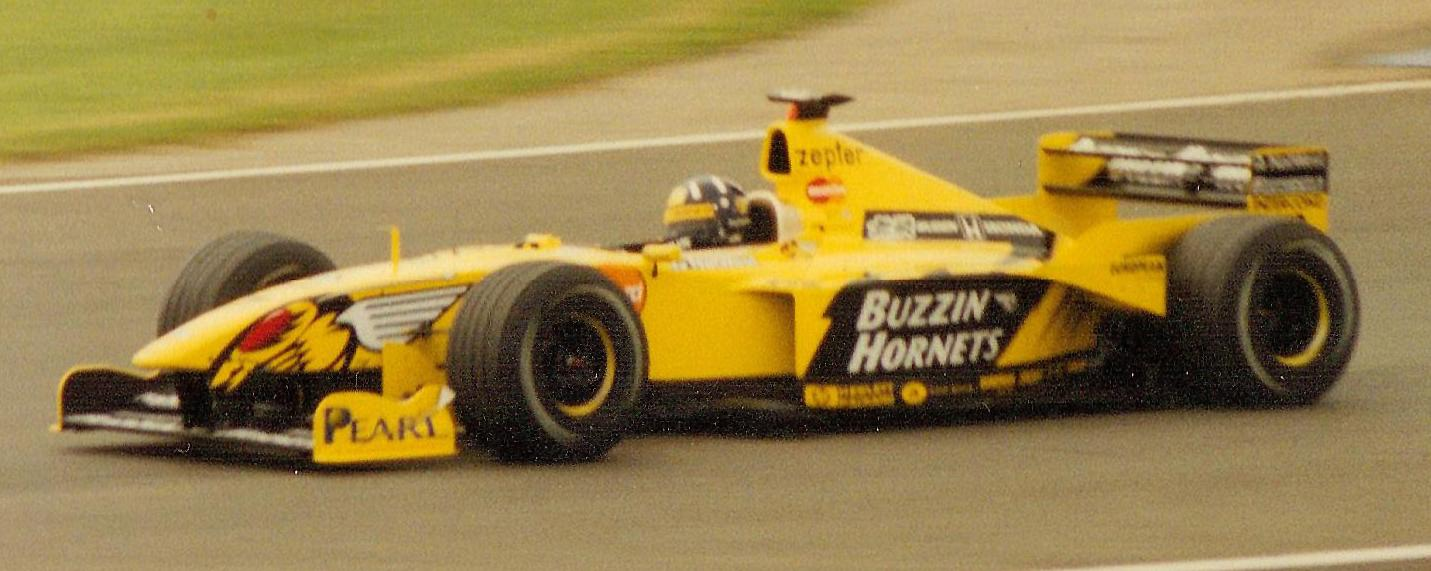
After eight years in the sport, Damon Hill had left F1 after 1999.

- Rubens Barrichello, who scored three podiums for Stewart in 1999, signed for Ferrari, replacing Eddie Irvine. The previous season's runner-up joined the newly established Jaguar team, in what was essentially a straight swap with Barrichello.
- 1996 champion Damon Hill retired from Formula One at the end of the 1999 season. Jarno Trulli moved from Prost to Jordan, filling Hill's vacant seat. Prost's other driver Olivier Panis left the team to become the test driver for McLaren. The two seats at the French team were taken by Jean Alesi, who moved from Sauber, and 1999 International Formula 3000 champion Nick Heidfeld, who had previously been a test driver at McLaren. Mika Salo signed for Sauber after short spells as an injury replacement for Ricardo Zonta for three races and Michael Schumacher for six races in 1999.
- Jenson Button made his debut for Williams after beating the team's test driver Bruno Junqueira in a 'shoot-out' test. Button replaced Alessandro Zanardi at the team. The Italian returned to motor racing in 2001, when he rejoined the CART championship.
- Toranosuke Takagi left Formula One to drive for Nakajima Racing in Formula Nippon, where he won the 2000 title. His place at Arrows was taken by Jos Verstappen, whose previous Formula One race had been the 1998 Japanese Grand Prix, when he was driving for Stewart.
- Gastón Mazzacane was promoted to a Minardi race drive for 2000, after spending the previous season as their test driver. The Argentine driver took the place of Luca Badoer, who was unable to find a race seat, and so focused on his role as test driver for Ferrari. Stéphane Sarrazin, who had driven for Minardi at the 1999 Brazilian Grand Prix, became the test driver for Prost.

Mid-season changes

- Jaguar test driver Luciano Burti made his racing debut at Austria, replacing the ill Eddie Irvine.

== Regulation changes ==
- To keep costs down, the V10 engine configuration was made fully mandatory in 2000 so that engine builders would not develop and experiment with other configurations but the V engine bank angle remained varied. The V10 configuration had been the most popular since the banning of turbocharged engines in 1989, and no other configuration had been used since 1998.
- A change to red flag procedure was introduced, where races stopped after two laps but before three-quarters race distance had been completed would be restarted with the cars lining up on the grid in the order they were at the end of the penultimate lap before the lap during which the red flag was shown. Only the race order and number of laps completed were taken into account for the restarted race, with time differences between the cars voided; as such, the distance of the restarted race became the number of laps remaining from the original races, deducted by three.
- On 7 September, the FIA announced that using cooled fuel during a Grand Prix would be banned "with immediate effect".
- This was the last full season for cars competing without traction control, launch control, and fully-automatic gearboxes, until the 2004 and 2008 seasons, respectively. (Note: Traction control was reintroduced five races into the 2001 season, at the Spanish Grand Prix.)

== Calendar ==
Round	Grand Prix	Circuit	Date
1	Australian Grand Prix	(Australia) Albert Park Circuit, Melbourne	12 March
2	Brazilian Grand Prix	(Brazil) Autódromo José Carlos Pace, São Paulo	26 March
3	San Marino Grand Prix	(Italy) Autodromo Enzo e Dino Ferrari, Imola	9 April
4	British Grand Prix	(United Kingdom) Silverstone Circuit, Silverstone	23 April
5	Spanish Grand Prix	(Spain) Circuit de Catalunya, Montmeló	7 May
6	European Grand Prix	(Germany) Nürburgring, Nürburg	21 May
7	Monaco Grand Prix	Circuit de Monaco, Monaco	4 June
8	Canadian Grand Prix	(Canada) Circuit Gilles Villeneuve, Montreal	18 June
9	French Grand Prix	(France) Circuit de Nevers Magny-Cours, Magny-Cours	2 July
10	Austrian Grand Prix	(Austria) A1-Ring, Spielberg	16 July
11	German Grand Prix	(Germany) Hockenheimring, Hockenheim	30 July
12	Hungarian Grand Prix	(Hungary) Hungaroring, Mogyoród	13 August
13	Belgian Grand Prix	(Belgium) Circuit de Spa-Francorchamps, Stavelot	27 August
14	Italian Grand Prix	(Italy) Autodromo Nazionale di Monza, Monza	10 September
15	United States Grand Prix	(United States) Indianapolis Motor Speedway, Speedway	24 September
16	Japanese Grand Prix	(Japan) Suzuka Circuit, Suzuka	8 October
17	Malaysian Grand Prix	(Malaysia) Sepang International Circuit, Sepang	22 October

=== Calendar changes ===
- The United States Grand Prix returned for 2000 after a nine-year absence being held at Indianapolis Motor Speedway.
- In a controversial move the FIA moved the British Grand Prix at Silverstone from its normal June/July date to 23 April. This was despite F1 chief executive Bernie Ecclestone trying to move French Grand Prix at Magny Cours to the same date.
- For 2000, the European Grand Prix at Nürburgring was moved from the autumn and a late season September date it had held in 1999 to a spring/summer date on the 21st of May, making it the sixth round of the year. The Nürburgring race had continuously been held with an autumn date over the previous three seasons, the Nürburgring round having been known as the Luxembourg Grand Prix during the 1997 and 1998 seasons.

== Report ==
=== Rounds 1 to 4 ===
The main changes among the top teams were that Eddie Irvine was replaced by Rubens Barrichello at Ferrari and at Jordan, former world champion Damon Hill had retired, and was replaced by Jarno Trulli.

The first race of the season was in Australia, and the top five placings were similar to the previous year. The McLaren pair of world champion Mika Häkkinen and David Coulthard started 1–2 ahead of the Ferrari pair of Michael Schumacher and Rubens Barrichello. The Jordans of Heinz-Harald Frentzen and Jarno Trulli were fifth and sixth. During the race, the McLarens kept their positions at the start, while Barrichello lost out to Frentzen. The McLarens pulled away from Michael Schumacher, but on lap ten, Coulthard retired with a misfire. Häkkinen's engine blew up nine laps later, giving the lead to Schumacher. Neither Jordan also lasted the race, Frentzen retiring with a hydraulic failure from second, and Trulli with an engine failure from fourth. All this gave Ferrari an easy 1–2 with Schumacher winning from Barrichello, with Ralf Schumacher, driving for Williams completing the podium.

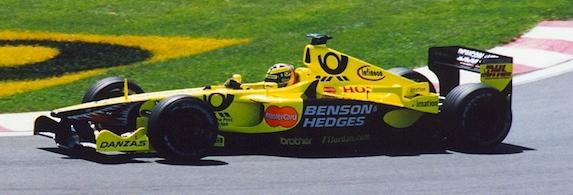
Heinz-Harald Frentzen (pictured In 2001) finished third in Brazil.

For the second round in Brazil, the top four were the same again in qualifying, with Häkkinen and Coulthard starting 1–2 ahead of Michael Schumacher and Barrichello. Schumacher, who was on a two-stop strategy took the lead within two laps, built up a 20-second gap, and pitted. He rejoined in second, behind Häkkinen. Coulthard was suffering from gearbox problems, and so was not quick enough. Barrichello, who was also on a two-stopper was stuck behind Häkkinen for 15 laps, before passing him, and this compromised his race. He rejoined fourth after his stop, but his engine blew up soon after. Häkkinen was starting to edge away from Michael Schumacher, until he had to retire with an oil leak. This gave Schumacher the win, ahead of Coulthard and Giancarlo Fisichella. There was controversy after the race when all the drivers in the top six with the exception of Fisichella were excluded because of problems with their wooden floors. The teams appealed but when the FIA was scrutineering the cars again, they found out that the front wing endplates on Coulthard's car were lower than they should have been. Thus, the position of everyone except for Coulthard was reinstated. The final top three were: Michael Schumacher, Fisichella and Frentzen. Notably, Jenson Button was sixth, and got his first ever championship point. He also set the record for the youngest F1 driver to score a point.

After two rounds, Michael Schumacher had a maximum 20 out of 20 points, and no one else had even ten, and notably both McLaren drivers had none. Second was Fisichella with 8, with Barrichello third with 6. Ferrari also had a big lead in the Constructors' Championship with 26 points, the second being Benetton with 8, and the third being Williams with 7. McLaren had none.

The European season started off in San Marino, and Häkkinen took his third consecutive pole, with Michael Schumacher splitting the McLarens, and Barrichello was fourth. Häkkinen and Schumacher maintained their positions at the start, while Barrichello got past Coulthard. The race developed into a battle between Häkkinen and Schumacher, and quick in and out laps during the second round of pitstops enabled the latter to take the lead. Schumacher won, with Häkkinen second, and Coulthard third ahead of Barrichello.

Round four was in Britain, and in a wet-dry qualifying, Barrichello took his third pole position of his career, beating Frentzen by three-thousandth of a second, with the McLarens on the second row, Häkkinen ahead of Coulthard. Michael Schumacher could manage only fifth. At the start, the top two got away well and kept their places, while Coulthard got ahead of his teammate, and Schumacher lost three places. Frentzen was on a two-stop strategy, and pitted, leaving Barrichello leading from Coulthard and Häkkinen. Barrichello kept a gap till his car started suffering from engine and hydraulic problems, and Coulthard took the lead on lap 30 with a superb passing manoeuvre on the outside at Stowe. He pitted two laps later, giving back the lead to the fading Barrichello. Barrichello hung around until lap 35 when he spun at Luffield, and drove his car to the pits only to find out his team weren't ready. He waited until the stop was over, only to find out that he couldn't restart the car as his hydraulics had completely failed. This left him with no option but to retire. Frentzen now led, but after his second stop he rejoined fourth behind the McLarens and the Ferrari of Schumacher. Frentzen's gearbox failed 6 laps from the end, forcing him to retire. Coulthard took his second consecutive home victory, ahead of Häkkinen who completed the McLaren 1–2, with Schumacher third.

The win got Coulthard to second in the standings with 14 points, but 20 behind Michael Schumacher who had 34. Häkkinen had 12, and Barrichello and Ralf Schumacher had nine. In the Constructors' Championship, Ferrari had 43 points, while McLaren had 26.

=== Rounds 5 to 8 ===
Round five was in Spain, and Michael Schumacher took his first pole of the year ahead of Häkkinen, Barrichello and Coulthard (who was not 100% fit after a plane crash in France). Schumacher and Häkkinen stayed first and second after the start, but their teammates had lost out to Ralf Schumacher. Michael Schumacher stalled during the second round of stops, and lost the lead to Häkkinen. After the stops, Michael Schumacher had a problem with his tyres, and was passed by Coulthard, Ralf Schumacher and Barrichello. He then pitted, and rejoined fifth. Häkkinen took his first win of the season, with Coulthard making it a second successive McLaren 1–2, and Barrichello completed the podium. Michael Schumacher was fifth behind his brother.

The European Grand Prix, held at the Nurburgring in Germany was next. Coulthard took pole ahead of Michael Schumacher, Häkkinen and Barrichello. Coulthard did not have a great start and was quickly passed by Schumacher. Häkkinen, however, had a blinder and shot past both of them. And then the rain came, resulting in Schumacher passing Häkkinen on lap 11 at the chicane. Schumacher kept the lead, Coulthard passed Häkkinen, and Barrichello was down in ninth. Häkkinen passed Coulthard, who was struggling badly with a problem. There were no more changes at the front. Schumacher won from Häkkinen, Coulthard was third but was lapped, and Barrichello charged back up from ninth to fourth.

With over a third of the season complete, Michael Schumacher led the championship with 46 points, Häkkinen was second with 28, Coulthard was third with 24, and Barrichello was fourth with 16. In the Constructors' Championship, Ferrari had 62 points, McLaren had 52, and Williams were best of the rest with 15.

The glamorous Monaco Grand Prix was the seventh round, and Michael Schumacher eased to pole. Jordan found some pace, with Trulli getting second ahead of Coulthard, and Frentzen fourth ahead of Häkkinen. As the race started, the top drivers maintained their places, but in the midfield, Jenson Button tipped Pedro de la Rosa into a spin, blocking the track. The race had to be red-flagged. Out came the second start, and all the drivers started cleanly. The Jordans were not as quick as they were in qualifying, and Trulli was clearly holding up Coulthard, and the latter could do nothing about it. Schumacher shot out into the distance at a second a lap. Then, on lap 37, Trulli retired with a gearbox failure, releasing Coulthard. Coulthard closed in on Schumacher, but with a gap of 36 seconds, there was nothing much he could do until Schumacher suffered suspension failure on the 55th lap, forcing him to retire. Häkkinen was fifth until he slowed down with a problem. The team were able to fix it and send him back out again. Frentzen, who was running second punted his car into the wall with eight laps to go, in an attrition-filled race. Coulthard took the win, ahead of Barrichello and Giancarlo Fisichella, while Häkkinen mustered sixth place.

Now to North America for the Canadian GP. Michael Schumacher took pole ahead of Coulthard, Barrichello and Häkkinen. The top two kept their grid positions into the first corner, but Jacques Villeneuve was up to third ahead of Barrichello and Häkkinen. This allowed the top two to pull away. And then Coulthard was given a ten-second stop-and-go penalty because his mechanics worked on his car less than 15 seconds before the parade lap. He rejoined in the midfield. Barrichello passed Villeneuve on lap 25, but the gap to Schumacher was 27 seconds. Häkkinen took third from Villeneuve on lap 28, and the order settled down until it started raining. Everyone pitted for wets, and the order was shuffled completely. Schumacher stayed first, but Fischella had got ahead of Barrichello and Häkkinen, with Trulli fifth. A mistake from Fisichella allowed Barrichello through into second. Michael Schumacher took his fifth win of the season, with Barrichello making it a Ferrari 1–2 ahead of Fisichella. Häkkinen had to be content with fourth.

With nearly half the season over, Michael Schumacher had a 22-point lead in the standings, with 56 points to Coulthard's 34. Häkkinen and Barrichello were not far behind, with 32 and 28 points respectively. In the Constructors' Championship, Ferrari had an 18-point lead over McLaren, with 84 points to the McLaren's 66. Benetton were third with 18.

=== Rounds 9 to 12 ===
The French Grand Prix was next on the calendar. Michael Schumacher took his third consecutive pole, and again Coulthard was second, Barrichello third and Häkkinen fourth. When the race started, Schumacher kept first but Coulthard was beaten by Barrichello. Schumacher slowly started to pull away from his teammate and built a lead. Coulthard's car handled better as the fuel load decreased, and on lap 22, he passed Barrichello. During the round of pitstops, Barrichello lost out to Häkkinen. Schumacher's tyres were badly blistered, and so the McLarens and Barrichello started to close in on him. Coulthard tried to pass him at the outside of the Adelaide hairpin but Schumacher pushed him wide. Coulthard was not happy and made a series of irate gestures. A few laps later, Coulthard went for the inside at the same corner and made the move cleanly. Coulthard apologized for his gestures after the race. Schumacher kept second until 12 laps from the end when his engine blew up. Coulthard won, with Häkkinen making it a McLaren 1–2, and Barrichello completed the podium.

The A1-Ring in Austria was the host for Round ten. Häkkinen and Coulthard started 1–2, for the first time since Brazil, with the Ferraris of Barrichello and Schumacher in third and fourth respectively. The McLarens maintained their positions at the start, but there was carnage behind, with the Ferraris at the centre. Trulli hit the back of Barrichello, and at the same time, Ricardo Zonta hit Schumacher, tipping him to a spin. Schumacher spun in Trulli's path, causing a collision between the two drivers that lead to their retirements from the race. During the mayhem that followed, Mika Salo emerged third and Pedro de la Rosa emerged fourth, with Barrichello down in ninth. The McLarens quickly disappeared into the distance, while de la Rosa took third from Salo. Barrichello charged back up to fourth, which became third when de la Rosa's engine failed, putting him out from third. Häkkinen and Coulthard gave McLaren their fourth 1–2, with Barrichello finishing third. After the race, McLaren were penalized and lost 10 Constructors' Championship points because an FIA seal was found to be missing from Häkkinen's car; Häkkinen did not lose any points.

With ten races out of 17 finished, Michael Schumacher led the championship with 56 points, whilst Coulthard was only 6 points behind with 50, and Häkkinen a further two points behind with 48. Barrichello was fourth with 36, and Fisichella was fifth with 18. In the Constructors' Championship, Ferrari led by only 4 points now, with 92 compared to McLaren's 88. Williams were third with 19.

Now to Germany, and Coulthard took his second pole ahead of Michael Schumacher, with Fisichella taking third from Häkkinen in a dry-wet qualifying. Häkkinen had one of his best ever starts, and shot up to first even before the first corner. Schumacher was hit from behind by Fisichella, and both were punted into the wall. This left Häkkinen and Coulthard running 1–2, with no one to challenge them. After 25 laps out of 44, the McLarens were half a minute ahead of third-placed Trulli. de la Rosa was fourth, ahead of Barrichello who was both recovering from a bad qualifying. And then, a disgruntled Mercedes-Benz employee ran to the track with a banner. The safety car was out, while the man was taken away. Everyone took the chance to pit, and Coulthard lost out badly because McLaren could not take both their cars at the same time. As the race restarted, it started raining. However, it rained only in some portion of the track. Everyone with the exception of Barrichello and Frentzen pitted. This left Barrichello leading ahead of Frentzen, Häkkinen, Trulli and Coulthard. Those on dries were lapping as quick as those on wets. Trulli was given a stop-go penalty for overtaking under yellow flags. Frentzen lost second when his gearbox failed. This left Barrichello to take his first ever win ahead of Häkkinen and Coulthard.

The drivers went to Hungary for the next round, and Michael Schumacher took pole ahead of Coulthard, Häkkinen, Ralf Schumacher and Barrichello. Häkkinen again started like a rocket, and beat both Michael Schumacher and Coulthard into the first corner. Häkkinen pulled away, and Coulthard was held up by Schumacher. Coulthard would have got in front of Schumacher at the second round of stops, but lost time behind Gastón Mazzacane and then Marc Gené. This meant he emerged a fraction behind Schumacher. Häkkinen won, with Schumacher and Coulthard making up the podium. Barrichello beat Ralf to fourth.

Häkkinen's win had now given him the lead in the championship, with 64 points to Schumacher's 62. Coulthard was third with 58, and Barrichello fourth with 49. Fisichella was fifth with 18. In the Constructors' Championship, McLaren took the lead from Ferrari, a lead of 1 point, with 112 compared to Ferrari's 111. Williams were third with 24.

=== Rounds 13 to 17 ===
Round 13 out of 17 was in Belgium. Häkkinen took pole, and much to his joy, Trulli and Button took second and third, pushing Michael Schumacher and Coulthard down to fourth and fifth. It was wet at the start, but the top 5 maintained their positions. Häkkinen immediately set about building up a lead. On lap five, Button tried to pass Trulli, and they collided. Trulli was out, and Button lost places. Schumacher and Coulthard gladly took second and third. The former now started to close in on Häkkinen, and took the lead when Häkkinen had a half-spin on lap 12. As the track dried out, everyone changed from wet to dry tyres. Coulthard stayed out too long, and dropped from third to ninth. On a dry track, Häkkinen was faster than Schumacher, and chased him down. With four laps to go, he made a move, but Schumacher turned at him and forced him to the grass at 200 mph. On the next lap, when they were coming to lap Ricardo Zonta, the two men took either sides, and when they turned, Häkkinen was ahead. Häkkinen went on to win and Schumacher had to be content with second. Ralf was third, and Coulthard bounced back to finish fourth.

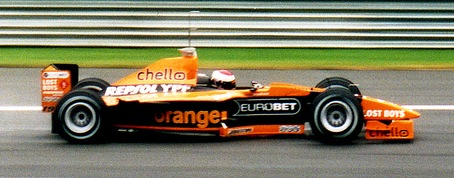
At the Italian Grand Prix, Jos Verstappen finished fourth, his team's best result of the season.

The next round was in Italy, the home of Ferrari. Their drivers did not disappoint, Schumacher and Barrichello giving them their first 1–2 start of the season, ahead of Häkkinen, Villeneuve and Coulthard. At the start, Schumacher and the McLarens started well, but Barrichello and Villeneuve started badly. Schumacher and Häkkinen were first and second, with Coulthard third. Into the second chicane, and Frentzen just braked too late, and hit the back of Barrichello and Trulli, who were running side by side. All three spun, and Coulthard too was collected in the confusion. Later, it came out that a fire marshal, Paolo Ghislimberti had been killed after he was hit on the chest by a wheel from this collision. The top three at the end of this carnage were: Michael Schumacher, Häkkinen and Ralf Schumacher. The race restarted after 10 laps behind the safety car, and Michael Schumacher and Häkkinen quickly pulled away from the rest. Häkkinen tried to outpace Schumacher, but he was just not as quick as the latter. Michael Schumacher took his sixth win of the year, ahead of Häkkinen and Ralf. After the race, Schumacher burst into tears in the press conference, when told that he had equalled Ayrton Senna's record of 41 wins, and about Ghislimberti's death.

With three more races to go, Häkkinen still led Michael Schumacher by two points, with 80 compared to the latter's 78. Coulthard was all but out of it, and was third with 61. Barrichello was fourth with 49, Ralf was fifth with 20, and Fisichella sixth with 18. In the Constructors' Championship, McLaren had 131 points, and a lead of four points over Ferrari who had 127. Williams was third with 30.

The United States Grand Prix hosted the 15th round, and Michael Schumacher took his seventh pole of the season. Coulthard was second, with Häkkinen and Barrichello third and fourth. Before the race, it rained, and so everyone started on wet tyres. The red lights stayed longer than usual for the start, and Coulthard took off a little too early. This gave him the lead, but it was clear that he would suffer a penalty. He led, ahead of Schumacher and Häkkinen. He knew he would have to suffer a penalty, and blocked Schumacher so that his teammate could close in. Schumacher was having none of it, and passed Coulthard on lap 7 at the first corner. The track began to dry out, and Häkkinen pitted for dries. He came out behind Gastón Mazzacane, and was stuck there. Coulthard soon had his penalty and dropped out of contention. The Ferraris stayed out late, and while Schumacher was ten seconds in the lead, Barrichello rejoined in the mid-field. The top three after the change for dries were Michael Schumacher, Häkkinen and Ralf Schumacher. Häkkinen set a string of fastest laps, and closed down a ten-second gap to Michael Schumacher to four in ten laps, only for his engine to blow up on lap 25. Michael Schumacher was left with a big lead ahead of his brother, which became even bigger when Ralf's engine failed with 12 laps to go, giving second to Frentzen. Frentzen, however was soon passed by a charging Barrichello. Schumacher had a spin towards the end, but hit nothing and survived. He went on to win, with Barrichello making it a Ferrari 1–2, and Frentzen completed the podium.

This win, coupled with Häkkinen's retirement gave Schumacher an eight-point lead, meaning that a win in the next race would give him the title. The result also gave Ferrari the lead in the Constructors' Championship.

The penultimate round was in Japan, and Michael Schumacher beat Häkkinen to pole by 0.009 seconds. Coulthard was third and Barrichello fourth. The race started in overcast conditions, with rain looming. Häkkinen started off better than Schumacher and took the lead. Coulthard maintained third. The two title contenders, Häkkinen and Schumacher pulled away from the others at over a second a lap and were separated by 2–3 seconds. The first round of stops changed nothing. Then, some rain started spitting down at the track, and Schumacher started to close in. Schumacher's second pitstop was three laps after Häkkinen's, and although he was two seconds behind Häkkinen before the stops, he came out four seconds ahead. Schumacher won the race, and the championship, with Häkkinen and Coulthard completing the podium. Barrichello finished fourth.

The final round of the season was in Malaysia. Michael Schumacher took pole again, ahead of Häkkinen, Coulthard and a flu-ridden Barrichello. Schumacher had a poor start from pole, and immediately both McLarens were ahead of him. However, it became clear that Häkkinen had jumped the start and he received a penalty. He let Coulthard through, and held up the Ferraris until he went in for the penalty. Coulthard had a good lead, but wasted it by running wide at Turn three. He pitted before Michael Schumacher, and the time he lost by the mistake gave the lead to Schumacher. The two ran together for the rest of the race, with Barrichello unable to keep up. Michael Schumacher won again, ahead of Coulthard and Barrichello, and this ensured the Constructors' Championship for Ferrari. Häkkinen charged back to finish fourth.

At the end of the season, Michael Schumacher was champion with 108 points, Häkkinen was second with 89, Coulthard third with 73, Barrichello fourth with 62, Ralf Schumacher fifth with 24, and Fisichella sixth with 18. In the Constructors' Championship, Ferrari won with 170 points, McLaren was second with 152, and Williams was third with 36.

Safety car

For this season, the safety car remained the Mercedes-Benz CL55 AMG, which was introduced in 1999.

== Results and standings ==
=== Grands Prix ===
Round	Grand Prix	Pole position	Fastest lap	Winning driver	Winning constructor	Report
1	(Australia) Australian Grand Prix	(Finland) Mika Häkkinen	(Brazil) Rubens Barrichello	(Germany) Michael Schumacher	(Italy) Ferrari	Report
2	(Brazil) Brazilian Grand Prix	(Finland) Mika Häkkinen	(Germany) Michael Schumacher	(Germany) Michael Schumacher	(Italy) Ferrari	Report
3	(Italy) San Marino Grand Prix	(Finland) Mika Häkkinen	(Finland) Mika Häkkinen	(Germany) Michael Schumacher	(Italy) Ferrari	Report
4	(United Kingdom) British Grand Prix	(Brazil) Rubens Barrichello	(Finland) Mika Häkkinen	(United Kingdom) David Coulthard	(United Kingdom) McLaren-Mercedes	Report
5	(Spain) Spanish Grand Prix	(Germany) Michael Schumacher	(Finland) Mika Häkkinen	(Finland) Mika Häkkinen	(United Kingdom) McLaren-Mercedes	Report
6	(Germany) European Grand Prix	(United Kingdom) David Coulthard	(Germany) Michael Schumacher	(Germany) Michael Schumacher	(Italy) Ferrari	Report
7	Monaco Grand Prix	(Germany) Michael Schumacher	(Finland) Mika Häkkinen	(United Kingdom) David Coulthard	(United Kingdom) McLaren-Mercedes	Report
8	(Canada) Canadian Grand Prix	(Germany) Michael Schumacher	(Finland) Mika Häkkinen	(Germany) Michael Schumacher	(Italy) Ferrari	Report
9	(France) French Grand Prix	(Germany) Michael Schumacher	(United Kingdom) David Coulthard	(United Kingdom) David Coulthard	(United Kingdom) McLaren-Mercedes	Report
10	(Austria) Austrian Grand Prix	(Finland) Mika Häkkinen	(United Kingdom) David Coulthard	(Finland) Mika Häkkinen	(United Kingdom) McLaren-Mercedes	Report
11	(Germany) German Grand Prix	(United Kingdom) David Coulthard	(Brazil) Rubens Barrichello	(Brazil) Rubens Barrichello	(Italy) Ferrari	Report
12	(Hungary) Hungarian Grand Prix	(Germany) Michael Schumacher	(Finland) Mika Häkkinen	(Finland) Mika Häkkinen	(United Kingdom) McLaren-Mercedes	Report
13	(Belgium) Belgian Grand Prix	(Finland) Mika Häkkinen	(Brazil) Rubens Barrichello	(Finland) Mika Häkkinen	(United Kingdom) McLaren-Mercedes	Report
14	(Italy) Italian Grand Prix	(Germany) Michael Schumacher	(Finland) Mika Häkkinen	(Germany) Michael Schumacher	(Italy) Ferrari	Report
15	United States Grand Prix	(Germany) Michael Schumacher	(United Kingdom) David Coulthard	(Germany) Michael Schumacher	(Italy) Ferrari	Report
16	(Japan) Japanese Grand Prix	(Germany) Michael Schumacher	(Finland) Mika Häkkinen	(Germany) Michael Schumacher	(Italy) Ferrari	Report
17	(Malaysia) Malaysian Grand Prix	(Germany) Michael Schumacher	(Finland) Mika Häkkinen	(Germany) Michael Schumacher	(Italy) Ferrari	Report

=== Scoring system ===
Points were awarded to the top six finishers in each race as follows:

Position	1st	2nd	3rd	4th	5th	6th
Points	10	6	4	3	2	1

=== World Drivers' Championship standings ===
Pos.	Driver	AUS (Australia)	BRA (Brazil)	SMR (Italy)	GBR (United Kingdom)	ESP (Spain)	EUR (Germany)	MON (Monaco)	CAN (Canada)	FRA (France)	AUT (Austria)	GER (Germany)	HUN (Hungary)	BEL (Belgium)	ITA (Italy)	USA (United States)	JPN (Japan)	MAL (Malaysia)	Points
1	(Germany) Michael Schumacher	1	1^{F}	1	3	5^{P}	1^{F}	Ret^{P}	1^{P}	Ret^{P}	Ret	Ret	2^{P}	2	1^{P}	1^{P}	1^{P}	1^{P}	108
2	(Finland) Mika Häkkinen	Ret^{P}	Ret^{P}	2^{P}^{F}	2^{F}	1^{F}	2	6^{F}	4^{F}	2	1^{P}	2	1^{F}	1^{P}	2^{F}	Ret	2^{F}	4^{F}	89
3	(United Kingdom) David Coulthard	Ret	DSQ	3	1	2	3^{P}	1	7	1^{F}	2^{F}	3^{P}	3	4	Ret	5^{F}	3	2	73
4	(Brazil) Rubens Barrichello	2^{F}	Ret	4	Ret^{P}	3	4	2	2	3	3	1^{F}	4	Ret^{F}	Ret	2	4	3	62
5	(Germany) Ralf Schumacher	3	5	Ret	4	4	Ret	Ret	14^{†}	5	Ret	7	5	3	3	Ret	Ret	Ret	24
6	(Italy) Giancarlo Fisichella	5	2	11	7	9	5	3	3	9	Ret	Ret	Ret	Ret	11	Ret	14	9	18
7	(Canada) Jacques Villeneuve	4	Ret	5	16^{†}	Ret	Ret	7	15^{†}	4	4	8	12	7	Ret	4	6	5	17
8	(United Kingdom) Jenson Button	Ret	6	Ret	5	17^{†}	10^{†}	Ret	11	8	5	4	9	5	Ret	Ret	5	Ret	12
9	(Germany) Heinz-Harald Frentzen	Ret	3	Ret	17^{†}	6	Ret	10^{†}	Ret	7	Ret	Ret	6	6	Ret	3	Ret	Ret	11
10	(Italy) Jarno Trulli	Ret	4	15^{†}	6	12	Ret	Ret	6	6	Ret	9	7	Ret	Ret	Ret	13	12	6
11	(Finland) Mika Salo	DSQ	DNS	6	8	7	Ret	5	Ret	10	6	5	10	9	7	Ret	10	8	6
12	(Netherlands) Jos Verstappen	Ret	7	14	Ret	Ret	Ret	Ret	5	Ret	Ret	Ret	13	15	4	Ret	Ret	10	5
13	(United Kingdom) Eddie Irvine	Ret	Ret	7	13	11	Ret	4	13	13	WD	10	8	10	Ret	7	8	6	4
14	(Brazil) Ricardo Zonta	6	9	12	Ret	8	Ret	Ret	8	Ret	Ret	Ret	14	12	6	6	9	Ret	3
15	(Austria) Alexander Wurz	7	Ret	9	9	10	12^{†}	Ret	9	Ret	10	Ret	11	13	5	10	Ret	7	2
16	(Spain) Pedro de la Rosa	Ret	8	Ret	Ret	Ret	6	DNS	Ret	Ret	Ret	6	16	16	Ret	Ret	12	Ret	2
17	(United Kingdom) Johnny Herbert	Ret	Ret	10	12	13	11^{†}	9	Ret	Ret	7	Ret	Ret	8	Ret	11	7	Ret	0
18	(Brazil) Pedro Diniz	Ret	DNS	8	11	Ret	7	Ret	10	11	9	Ret	Ret	11	8	8	11	Ret	0
19	(Spain) Marc Gené	8	Ret	Ret	14	14	Ret	Ret	16^{†}	15	8	Ret	15	14	9	12	Ret	Ret	0
20	(Germany) Nick Heidfeld	9	Ret	Ret	Ret	16	EX	8	Ret	12	Ret	12^{†}	Ret	Ret	Ret	9	Ret	Ret	0
21	(Argentina) Gastón Mazzacane	Ret	10	13	15	15	8	Ret	12	Ret	12	11	Ret	17	10	Ret	15	13^{†}	0
22	(France) Jean Alesi	Ret	Ret	Ret	10	Ret	9	Ret	Ret	14	Ret	Ret	Ret	Ret	12	Ret	Ret	11	0
23	(Brazil) Luciano Burti										11								0
Pos.	Driver	AUS (Australia)	BRA (Brazil)	SMR (Italy)	GBR (United Kingdom)	ESP (Spain)	EUR (Germany)	MON (Monaco)	CAN (Canada)	FRA (France)	AUT (Austria)	GER (Germany)	HUN (Hungary)	BEL (Belgium)	ITA (Italy)	USA (United States)	JPN (Japan)	MAL (Malaysia)	Points

Key
Colour	Result
Gold	Winner
Silver	Second place
Bronze	Third place
Green	Other points position
Blue	Other classified position
Blue	Not classified, finished (NC)
Purple	Not classified, retired (Ret)
Red	Did not qualify (DNQ)
Black	Disqualified (DSQ)
White	Did not start (DNS)
White	Race cancelled (C)
Blank	Did not practice (DNP)
Blank	Excluded (EX)
Blank	Did not arrive (DNA)
Blank	Withdrawn (WD)
Blank	Did not enter (empty cell)
Annotation	Meaning
P	Pole position
F	Fastest lap

Notes:

- † – Driver did not finish the Grand Prix but was classified, as he completed more than 90% of the race distance.

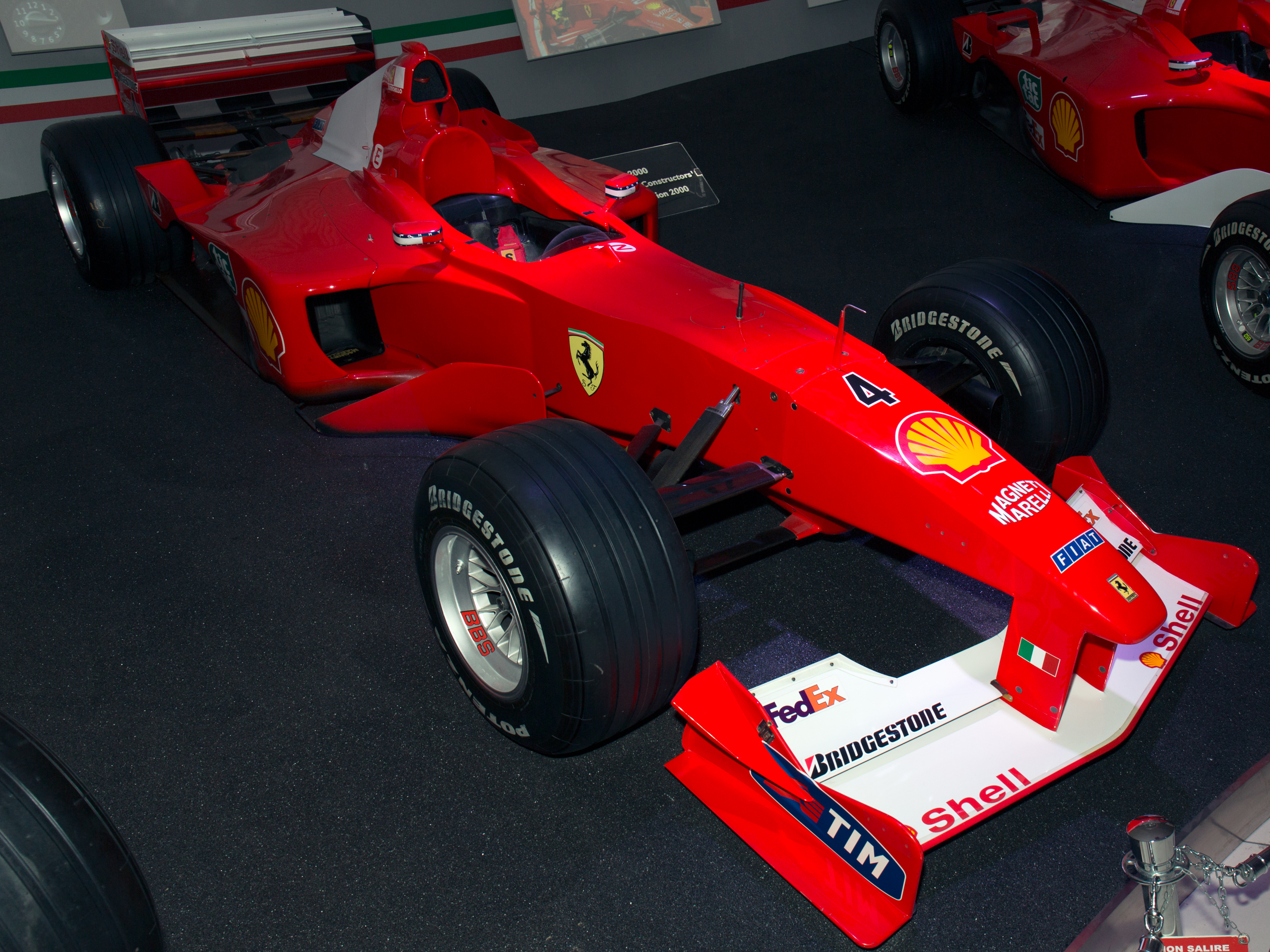
Ferrari successfully defended their World Constructors' Championship title

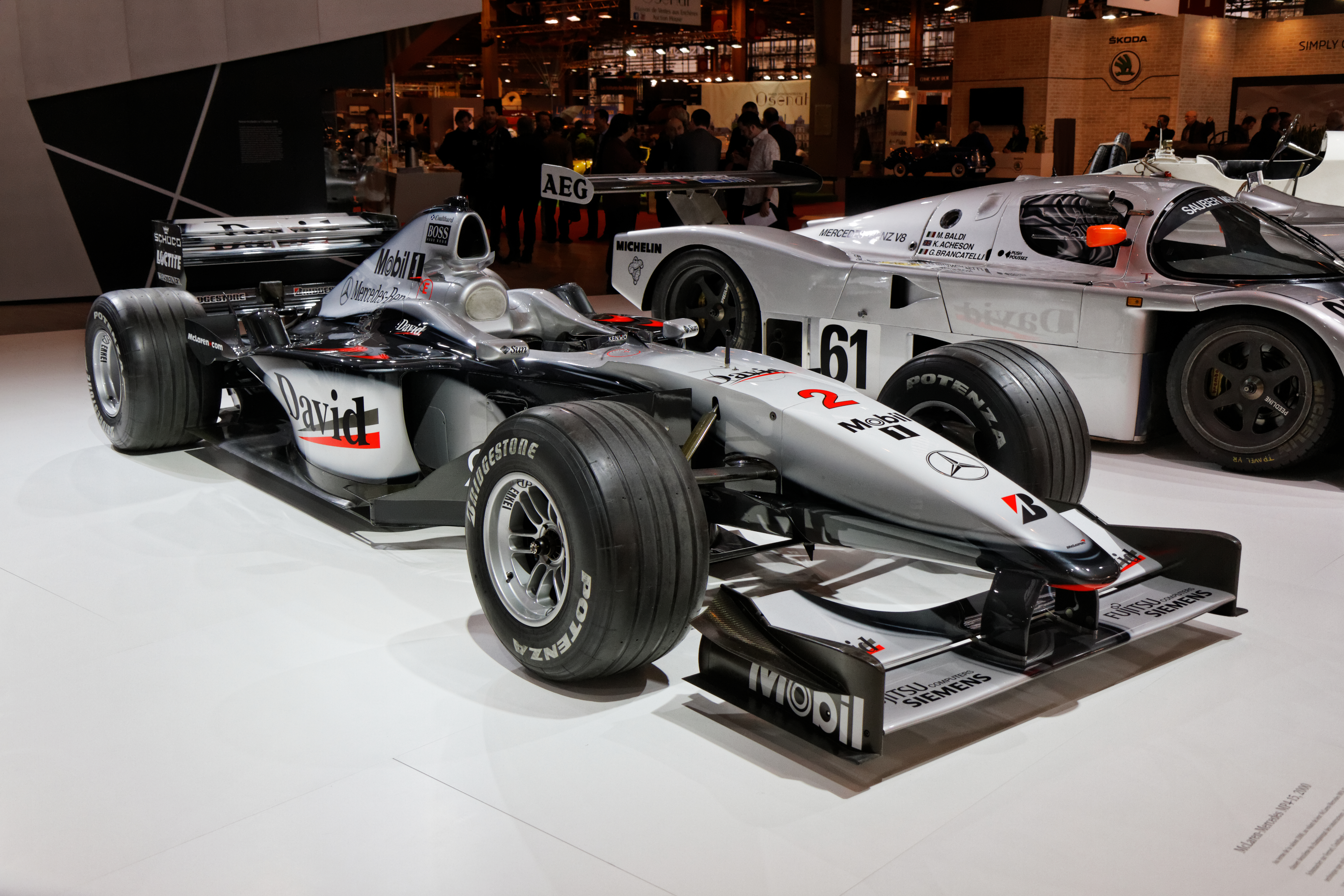
McLaren-Mercedes placed second in the Constructors' Championship

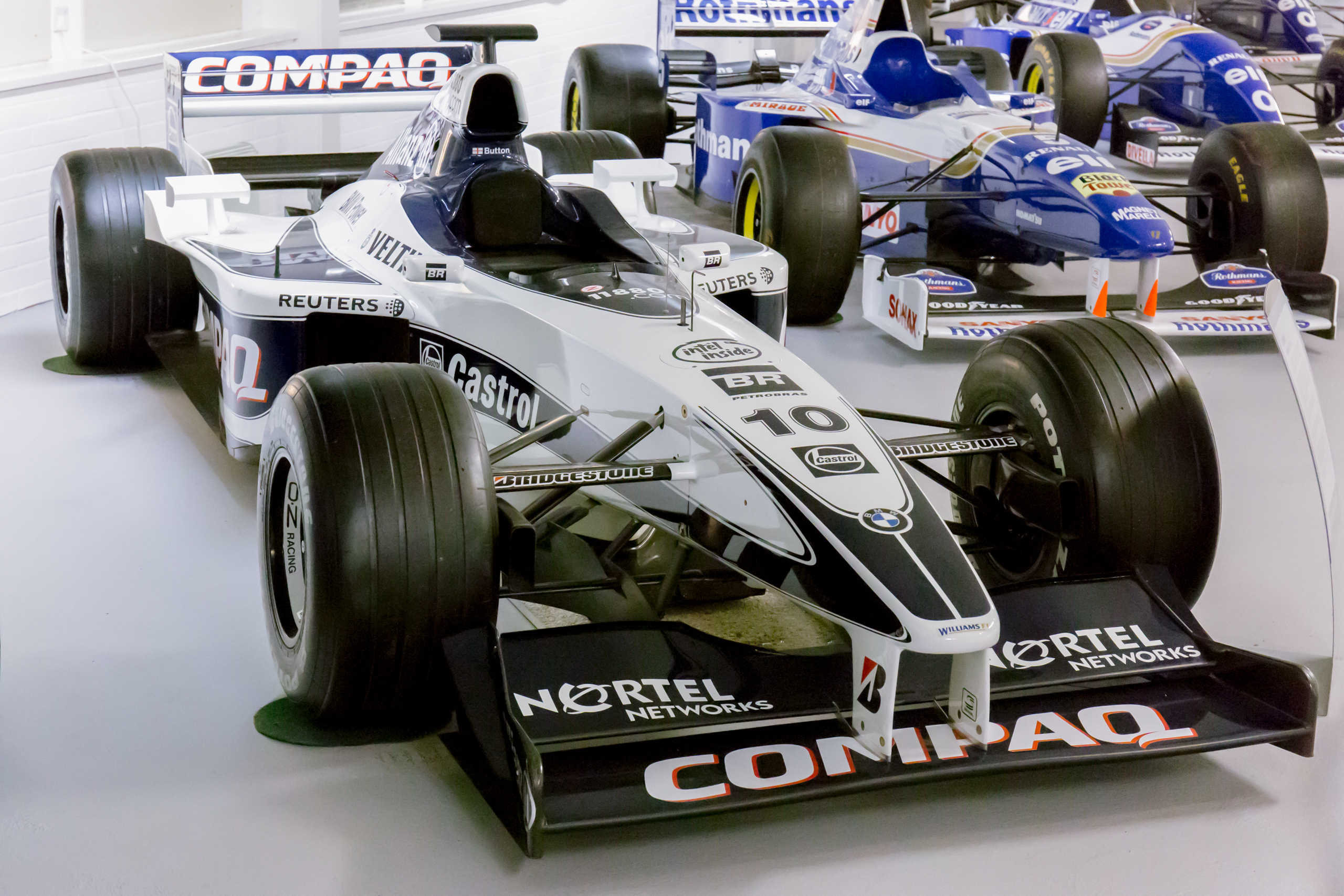
Williams-BMW placed third in the Constructors' Championship

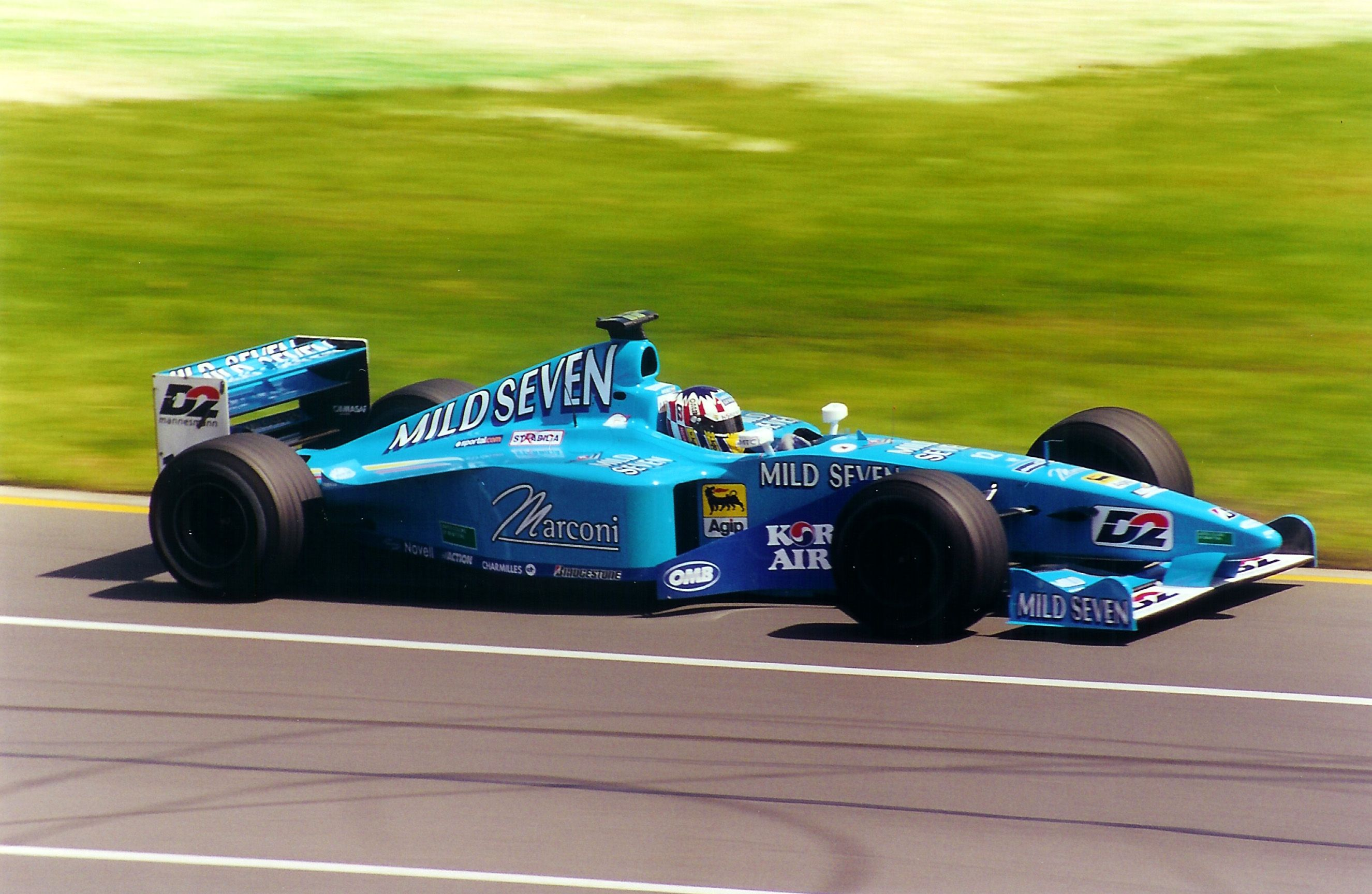
Benetton-Playlife placed fourth in the Constructors' Championship

=== World Constructors' Championship standings ===
Pos.	Constructor	No.	AUS (Australia)	BRA (Brazil)	SMR (Italy)	GBR (United Kingdom)	ESP (Spain)	EUR (Germany)	MON (Monaco)	CAN (Canada)	FRA (France)	AUT (Austria)	GER (Germany)	HUN (Hungary)	BEL (Belgium)	ITA (Italy)	USA (United States)	JPN (Japan)	MAL (Malaysia)	Points
1	(Italy) Ferrari	3	1	1^{F}	1	3	5^{P}	1^{F}	Ret^{P}	1^{P}	Ret^{P}	Ret	Ret	2^{P}	2	1^{P}	1^{P}	1^{P}	1^{P}	170
1	(Italy) Ferrari	4	2^{F}	Ret	4	Ret^{P}	3	4	2	2	3	3	1^{F}	4	Ret^{F}	Ret	2	4	3	170
2	(United Kingdom) McLaren-Mercedes	1	Ret^{P}	Ret^{P}	2^{P}^{F}	2^{F}	1^{F}	2	6^{F}	4^{F}	2	1^{P} (Note: McLaren drivers scored 162 points, but the constructor was not awarded the 10 points for Hakkinen's win in Austria due to a missing seal.)	2	1^{F}	1^{P}	2^{F}	Ret	2^{F}	4^{F}	152
2	(United Kingdom) McLaren-Mercedes	2	Ret	DSQ	3	1	2	3^{P}	1	7	1^{F}	2^{F}	3^{P}	3	4	Ret	5^{F}	3	2	152
3	(United Kingdom) Williams-BMW	9	3	5	Ret	4	4	Ret	Ret	14^{†}	5	Ret	7	5	3	3	Ret	Ret	Ret	36
3	(United Kingdom) Williams-BMW	10	Ret	6	Ret	5	17^{†}	10^{†}	Ret	11	8	5	4	9	5	Ret	Ret	5	Ret	36
4	(Italy) Benetton-Playlife	11	5	2	11	7	9	5	3	3	9	Ret	Ret	Ret	Ret	11	Ret	14	9	20
4	(Italy) Benetton-Playlife	12	7	Ret	9	9	10	12^{†}	Ret	9	Ret	10	Ret	11	13	5	10	Ret	7	20
5	(United Kingdom) BAR-Honda	22	4	Ret	5	16^{†}	Ret	Ret	7	15^{†}	4	4	8	12	7	Ret	4	6	5	20
5	(United Kingdom) BAR-Honda	23	6	9	12	Ret	8	Ret	Ret	8	Ret	Ret	Ret	14	12	6	6	9	Ret	20
6	(Republic of Ireland) Jordan-Mugen-Honda	5	Ret	3	Ret	17^{†}	6	Ret	10^{†}	Ret	7	Ret	Ret	6	6	Ret	3	Ret	Ret	17
6	(Republic of Ireland) Jordan-Mugen-Honda	6	Ret	4	15^{†}	6	12	Ret	Ret	6	6	Ret	9	7	Ret	Ret	Ret	13	12	17
7	(United Kingdom) Arrows-Supertec	18	Ret	8	Ret	Ret	Ret	6	Ret	Ret	Ret	Ret	6	16	16	Ret	Ret	12	Ret	7
7	(United Kingdom) Arrows-Supertec	19	Ret	7	14	Ret	Ret	Ret	Ret	5	Ret	Ret	Ret	13	15	4	Ret	Ret	10	7
8	(Switzerland) Sauber-Petronas	16	Ret	DNS	8	11	Ret	7	Ret	10	11	9	Ret	Ret	11	8	8	11	Ret	6
8	(Switzerland) Sauber-Petronas	17	DSQ	DNS	6	8	7	Ret	5	Ret	10	6	5	10	9	7	Ret	10	8	6
9	(United Kingdom) Jaguar-Cosworth	7	Ret	Ret	7	13	11	Ret	4	13	13	11	10	8	10	Ret	7	8	6	4
9	(United Kingdom) Jaguar-Cosworth	8	Ret	Ret	10	12	13	11^{†}	9	Ret	Ret	7	Ret	Ret	8	Ret	11	7	Ret	4
10	(Italy) Minardi-Fondmetal	20	8	Ret	Ret	14	14	Ret	Ret	16^{†}	15	8	Ret	15	14	9	12	Ret	Ret	0
10	(Italy) Minardi-Fondmetal	21	Ret	10	13	15	15	8	Ret	12	Ret	12	11	Ret	17	10	Ret	15	13^{†}	0
11	(France) Prost-Peugeot	14	Ret	Ret	Ret	10	Ret	9	Ret	Ret	14	Ret	Ret	Ret	Ret	12	Ret	Ret	11	0
11	(France) Prost-Peugeot	15	9	Ret	Ret	Ret	16	EX	8	Ret	12	Ret	12^{†}	Ret	Ret	Ret	9	Ret	Ret	0
Pos.	Constructor	No.	AUS (Australia)	BRA (Brazil)	SMR (Italy)	GBR (United Kingdom)	ESP (Spain)	EUR (Germany)	MON (Monaco)	CAN (Canada)	FRA (France)	AUT (Austria)	GER (Germany)	HUN (Hungary)	BEL (Belgium)	ITA (Italy)	USA (United States)	JPN (Japan)	MAL (Malaysia)	Points

Notes:

- † – Driver did not finish the Grand Prix but was classified, as he completed more than 90% of the race distance.
