= Sauber C18 =

Formula One racing car

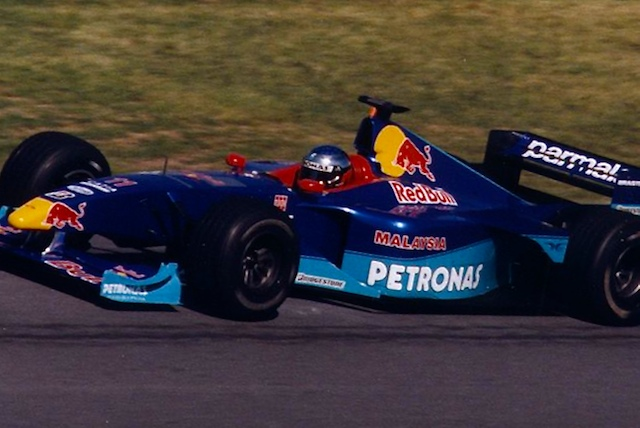
- Jean Alesi driving the C18 at the 1999 Canadian Grand Prix
- Category: Formula One
- Constructor: Sauber
- Designers: Leo Ress (Technical Director); Osamu Goto (Engine Director); Ian Thomson (Head of Chassis Design); Seamus Mullarkey (Head of Aerodynamics); Mike Jennings (Chief Aerodynamicist)
- Predecessor: Sauber C17
- Successor: Sauber C19

Technical specifications
- Chassis: Moulded carbon fibre composite structure
- Suspension (front): Double wishbones, pushrod
- Suspension (rear): Double wishbones, pushrod
- Engine: Petronas SPE 03A (Ferrari), 80° V10, NA
- Transmission: Sauber seven-speed longitudinal sequential semi-automatic
- Fuel: Shell
- Lubricants: Shell
- Tyres: Bridgestone

Competition history
- Notable entrants: Red Bull Sauber Petronas
- Notable drivers: 11. (France) Jean Alesi; 12. (Brazil) Pedro Diniz
- Debut: 1999 Australian Grand Prix
| Races | Wins | Poles | F/Laps |
|---|---|---|---|
| 16 | 0 | 0 | 0 |
- Constructors' Championships: 0
- Drivers' Championships: 0

The Sauber C18 was the car with which the Sauber team competed in the 1999 Formula One World Championship. It was driven by Frenchman Jean Alesi, in his second year with the team, and Brazilian Pedro Diniz, who joined from Arrows.

== Design and development ==
The C18 was launched at the Museum Tinguely in Basel, Switzerland. The C18 was a clear development of the C17 from the season prior. The new car did however feature an upgraded Ferrari engine named SPE 03A, rebadged Petronas, and a seven speed gearbox for the first time. The C18 would run Bridgestone tyres, a first for Sauber, as Goodyear withdrew from Formula One before 1999. Bringing Diniz onboard was worth around $7million for the Sauber team, and with the saving on Johnny Herbert's salary, it was estimated Sauber had an additional $12million in budget for developing the C18.

The C18 retained a similar livery to the season prior, a two tone blue livery with flashes of red and extensive sponsorship from energy drinks manufacturer, Red Bull and Malaysian company Petronas. New driver Pedro Diniz also brought with him sponsorship from Parmalat, a move that would cause a court case involving his former employer Arrows that would not be resolved until 2002.

In early testing, the C18 suffered some mechanical issues, but both drivers were happy with the performance. By mid-February Alesi was classified fastest during the Barcelona test ahead of McLaren and Jordan. After the season opening Grand Prix, Technical Director Leo Ress confirmed the C18 had a flexible rear wing, before the FIA implemented a standard flexibility regulation in Brazil. This would later be banned.

By the mid point of 1999, Sauber confirmed they would retain their deal for engines from Ferrari. This was estimated to cost the team $15million per year.

== Racing performance ==
The C18 struggled throughout the 1999 season with a large number of retirements. On just 12 occasions did a C18 cross the finish line of a Grand Prix, with Diniz chalking up 12 retirements in 16 races, failing to finish a Grand Prix until Canada in round 6. Alesi meanwhile fared slightly better with 8 retirements. Alesi chalked up the first points of the season in Round 3 at San Marino with a 6th place finish. Diniz would score the team's next 3 points with 6th place finishes at the Canadian, British and Austrian Grand Prix. Alesi added the team's final point at the final Grand Prix of the season in Japan.

Diniz was fortunate to escape injury at the European Grand Prix, after his car was launched into a barrel roll at the start of the race which caused his roll bar to fail. Alesi was hospitalised after a high speed crash at the Hungaroring.

After Michael Schumacher's accident at Silverstone, Sauber nearly lost Alesi to Ferrari, yet the Frenchman declined a hypothetical return. After the Hungarian Grand Prix, Alesi told ITV reporter James Allen that he would leave Sauber, criticising the car and team. He would later sign for Prost. Mika Salo, who had ultimately deputised for Schumacher at the Prancing Horses instead of Alesi, would sign for Sauber later on.

At the end of the season, Diniz and Alesi finished 14th and 15th in the Drivers' Championship respectively, while Sauber finished eighth in the Constructors' Championship, their five points being their lowest tally since their entry into F1 in 1993.

== Livery ==
At the Malaysian Grand Prix, a Malaysian flag featured on the engine cover to commemorate the inaugural race that held there.

== Complete Formula One results ==
(key) (results in bold indicate pole position)

| Year | Team | Engine | Tyres | Drivers | 1 | 2 | 3 | 4 | 5 | 6 | 7 | 8 | 9 | 10 | 11 | 12 | 13 | 14 | 15 | 16 | Points | WCC |
|---|---|---|---|---|---|---|---|---|---|---|---|---|---|---|---|---|---|---|---|---|---|---|
| 1999 | Red Bull Sauber Petronas | Petronas V10 | **B** | | AUS | BRA | SMR | MON | ESP | CAN | FRA | GBR | AUT | GER | HUN | BEL | ITA | EUR | MAL | JPN | **5** | **8th** |
| 1999 | Red Bull Sauber Petronas | Petronas V10 | **B** | (France) Jean Alesi | Ret | Ret | 6 | Ret | Ret | Ret | Ret | 14 | Ret | 8 | 16 | 9 | 9 | Ret | 7 | 6 | **5** | **8th** |
| 1999 | Red Bull Sauber Petronas | Petronas V10 | **B** | (Brazil) Pedro Diniz | Ret | Ret | Ret | Ret | Ret | 6 | Ret | 6 | 6 | Ret | Ret | Ret | Ret | Ret | Ret | 11 | **5** | **8th** |
