= Williams FW21 =

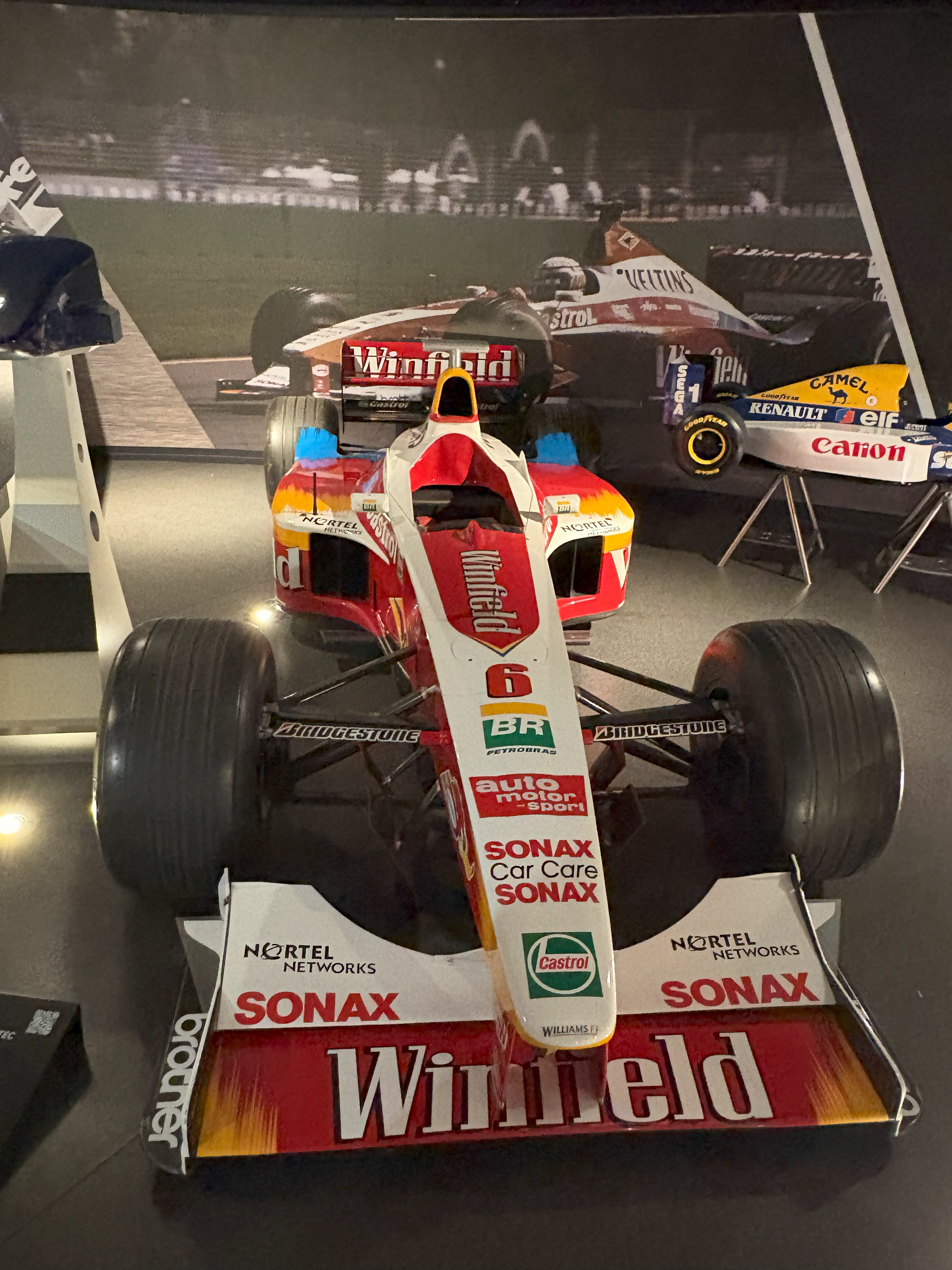
- The FW21 of Ralf Schumacher at the Williams heritage museum
- Category: Formula One
- Constructor: Williams
- Designers: Patrick Head (Technical Director); Gavin Fisher (Chief Designer); Brian O'Roake (Chief Composites Engineer); Mark Tatham (Chief Mechanical Engineer); Geoff Willis (Head of Aerodynamics); Jason Somerville (Senior Aerodynamicist)
- Predecessor: Williams FW20
- Successor: Williams FW22

Technical specifications
- Chassis: Carbon-fibre monocoque
- Suspension (front): Williams double wishbone, pushrod
- Suspension (rear): Williams double wishbone, pushrod
- Engine: Renault RS9 (branded as Supertec) FB01 3.0-litre V10 (71°) naturally aspirated mid-engined
- Transmission: Williams 6-speed longitudinal semi-automatic sequential
- Power: 780 hp @ 15,800 rpm
- Fuel: Petrobras
- Lubricants: Castrol
- Tyres: Bridgestone

Competition history
- Notable entrants: Winfield Williams
- Notable drivers: 5. (Italy) Alessandro Zanardi; 6. (Germany) Ralf Schumacher
- Debut: 1999 Australian Grand Prix
- Last event: 1999 Japanese Grand Prix
Races	Wins	Podiums	Poles	F/Laps
16	0	3	0	1
- Constructors' Championships: 0
- Drivers' Championships: 0

The Williams FW21 was the car with which the Williams team competed in the 1999 Formula One World Championship. It was driven by German Ralf Schumacher, who had swapped from Jordan with compatriot Heinz-Harald Frentzen, and Italian Alessandro Zanardi, who had last raced in Formula One in 1994 but had since won the CART championship twice.

== Design ==
=== Engine ===
This was also the team's last season using a Renault engine (badged as a customer Supertec) until one was fitted in the race winning FW34 in 2012; with a new works deal with BMW for the 2000 season.

== Season summary ==
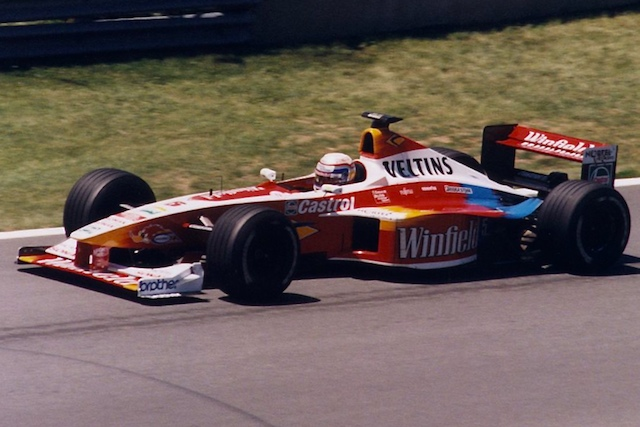
Alex Zanardi driving the FW21 at the 1999 Canadian Grand Prix

Schumacher had a successful season and was a consistent front-runner with the all-new design of the FW21, scoring points in eleven of the sixteen Grands Prix. The German took three podium finishes across the year, with third place finishes at the Australian and British Grand Prix and a season best second place in Italy. Schumacher also came very close to taking victory at the Nürburgring in the European Grand Prix before a late puncture scuppered his hopes and relegated the German to finishing fourth. Schumacher would go on to finish sixth in the 1999 Drivers' Championship with 35 points.

Zanardi struggled all season with the handling characteristics of the then-recently introduced grooved tyres and failed to score a point. He was dropped at the end of the year in favour of Formula Three driver Jenson Button.

The team resided in fourth place in the Constructors Championship for much of the year, unable to challenge McLaren and Ferrari and being generally outpaced by Jordan. The team eventually fell behind Stewart and finished fifth in the Constructors' Championship with 35 points, all scored by Schumacher and thus Williams ended up with their worst season since 1990.

== Livery ==
This was the second and final year for Williams had a sponsorship deal with a cigarette brand Winfield as the team's main sponsor. Williams used 'Winfield' logos, except at the French and British Grands Prix, where it was replaced with "WilliamsF1". In Canada, the kangaroo emblem was replaced with a boomerang-styled emblem. In French, Veltins logo was replaced with "Veltins alkoholfrei" but it was covered up by a barcode for scale models and video games.

The car's livery was primarily red and white, as in 1998, but incorporated blue and yellow elements to reflect the colour scheme of the cartoon character Woody Woodpecker. An emblem depicting him was featured on the nose cone as part of a sponsorship with Universal Studios.

== FW21B ==
A "B" spec car was used for testing the BMW V10 engine for their return in 2000 season. Later, the car were run on Michelin tyres, testing them in preparation for their return in the 2001 season.

== Complete Formula One results ==
(key) (results in bold indicate pole position, results in italic indicate fastest laps)

Year	Team	Engine	Tyres	Drivers	1	2	3	4	5	6	7	8	9	10	11	12	13	14	15	16	Points	WCC
1999	Williams	Supertec FB01 V10	**B**		AUS	BRA	SMR	MON	ESP	CAN	FRA	GBR	AUT	GER	HUN	BEL	ITA	EUR	MAL	JPN	**35**	**5th**
1999	Williams	Supertec FB01 V10	**B**	Alessandro Zanardi	Ret	Ret	11^{†}	8	Ret	Ret	Ret	11	Ret	Ret	Ret	8	7	Ret	10	Ret	**35**	**5th**
1999	Williams	Supertec FB01 V10	**B**	Ralf Schumacher	3	4	Ret	Ret	5	4	4	3	Ret	4	9	5	2	4	Ret	5	**35**	**5th**

Notes:

- † – Driver did not finish the Grand Prix but was classified, as he completed more than 90% of the race distance.

== Sponsors ==
Brand	Country	Placed on
Winfield	Australia	Rear wing, fin, sidepods, front wing, barge board, nose
Komatsu	Japan	Fin
Sonax	Germany	Front wing, nosecone
Castrol	United Kingdom	Rear wing end plate, nose, side
Auto Motor und Sport	Germany	Nose, fin
Veltins	Germany	Fin
Magneti Marelli	Italy	Wing pillar
Woody Woodpecker	United States	Nose cone
Brother	Japan	Front wing end pillar
Nortel	Canada	Front wing, rear wing end plate, sidepods
Petrobras	Brazil	Nose, mirrors
