= McLaren MP4/14 =

Formula One racing car

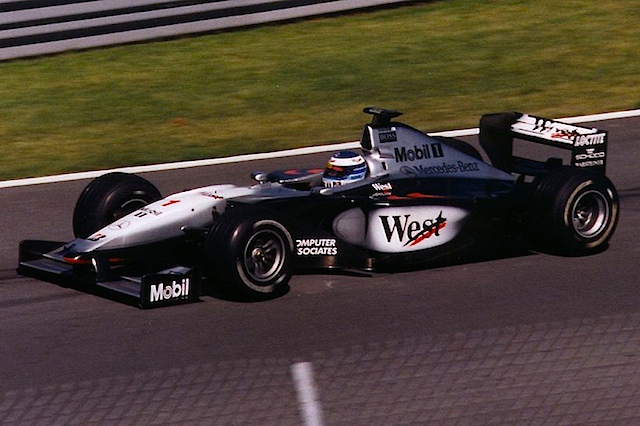
- Mika Häkkinen driving the MP4/14 at the 1999 Canadian Grand Prix
- Category: Formula One
- Constructor: McLaren
- Designers: Adrian Newey (Technical Director); Neil Oatley (Chief Designer); Steve Nichols (Engineering Director); Matthew Jeffreys (Head of Vehicle Design); David North (Head of Transmission); David Neilson (Head of Suspension); Paddy Lowe (Head of R&D); Henri Durand (Head of Aerodynamics); Mario Illien (Technical Director, Engine - Ilmor-Mercedes); Stuart Grove (Chief Designer, Engine - Ilmor-Mercedes)
- Predecessor: MP4/13
- Successor: MP4/15

Technical specifications
- Chassis: Moulded carbon fibre/aluminium honeycomb composite structure.
- Suspension (front): Double wishbones, pushrod-operated rockers.
- Suspension (rear): Double wishbones, pushrod-operated rockers.
- Engine: Mercedes-Benz FO110H 3.0 L (183.1 cu in) 72° V10, naturally aspirated, mid-engined.
- Transmission: McLaren 7-speed sequential
- Power: 785–810 hp (585.4–604.0 kW) at 17,000 rpm
- Weight: 600 kg (1,323 lb) (inc. driver.)
- Fuel: Mobil Unleaded
- Tyres: Bridgestone

Competition history
- Notable entrants: West McLaren Mercedes
- Notable drivers: 1. (Finland) Mika Häkkinen; 2. (United Kingdom) David Coulthard
- Debut: 1999 Australian Grand Prix
- First win: 1999 Brazilian Grand Prix
- Last win: 1999 Japanese Grand Prix
- Last event: 1999 Japanese Grand Prix
Races	Wins	Podiums	Poles	F/Laps
16	7	16	11	9
- Drivers' Championships: 1 (1999, Mika Häkkinen)

The McLaren MP4/14 was a Formula One car built and designed by the McLaren-Mercedes team to compete in the 1999 Formula One World Championship. Designed primarily by Neil Oatley and Henri Durand under the direction of Adrian Newey, Mario Illien provided McLaren with its bespoke engine. The car gave Mika Häkkinen his second Formula One Drivers' Championship in a row, but McLaren was unable to defend their title in the World Constructors' Championship, losing narrowly to Scuderia Ferrari.

== Overview ==
The MP4/14 was the fastest car of the season, with aerodynamics that were even more advanced than the previous year's all-conquering MP4/13, while the Mercedes engine remained the most powerful on the grid. However, serious reliability problems, as well as errors by the drivers, meant that the Constructors' Championship was won by Ferrari.

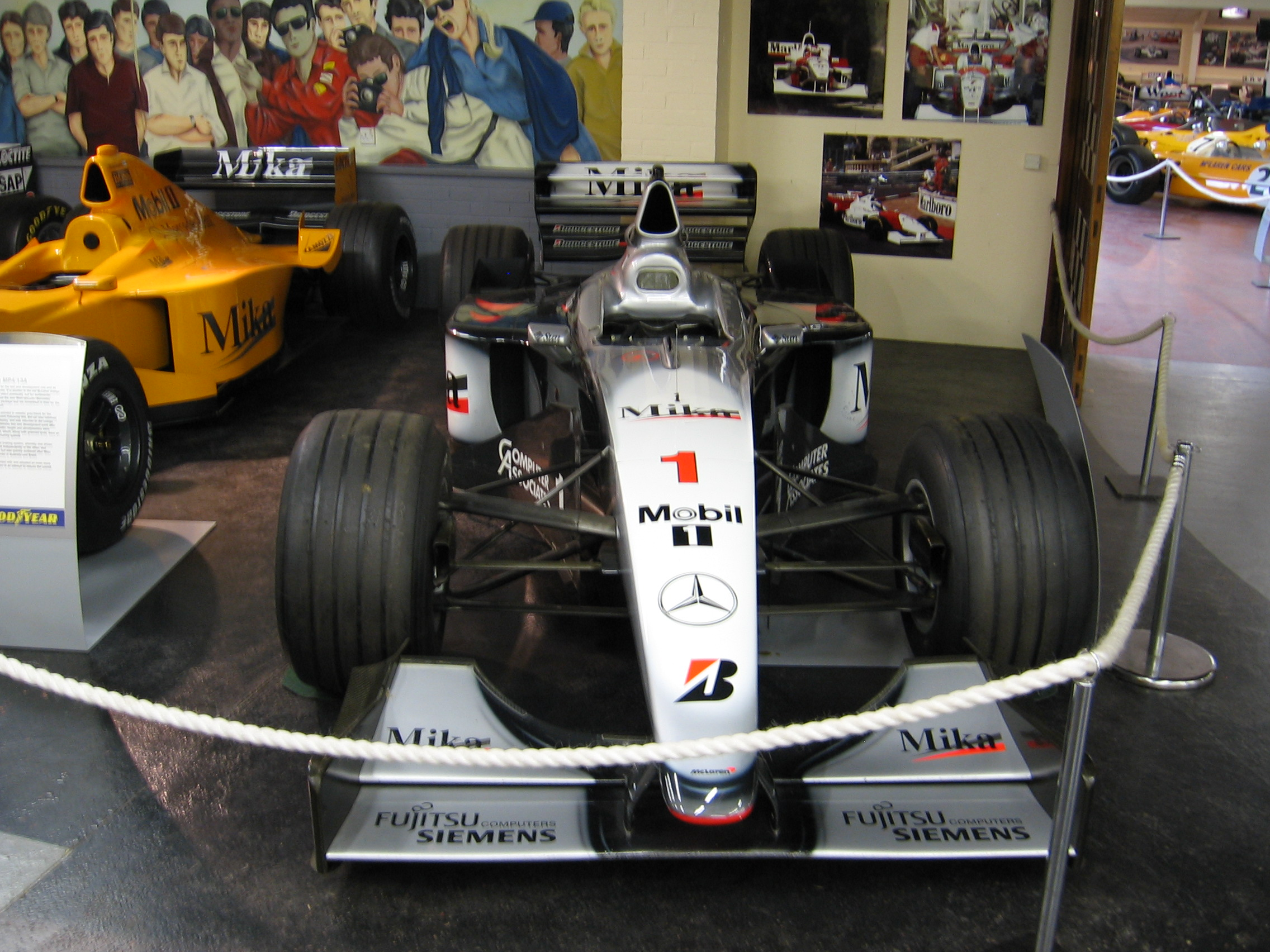
McLaren MP4/14 on display at the Donington Collection. The car carries chassis number 4 and is in the state it crossed the line to win both the 1999 Japanese Grand Prix and the Formula One Drivers' Championship for its driver, Mika Häkkinen.

== Steering wheel ==
Mika Häkkinen and David Coulthard used different shaped MP4/14 steering wheels. Häkkinen's version was the butterfly-style wheel, and Coulthard's included a lower grip. McLaren used four gearshift paddles in the MP4/14. The two blue paddles are the gear selectors, while the lower pair allow the driver to operate the clutch with either hand.

== Sponsorship and livery ==
McLaren used the "West" logos, except at the French, British and Belgian Grands Prix; they were replaced with a "double stars" logo in Britain, while in France and Belgium by the drivers' first names.

== Complete Formula One results ==
(key) (results in bold indicate pole position; results in italics indicate fastest lap)

Year	Team	Engine	Tyres	Drivers	1	2	3	4	5	6	7	8	9	10	11	12	13	14	15	16	Points	WCC
1999	McLaren	Mercedes V10	**B**		AUS	BRA	SMR	MON	ESP	CAN	FRA	GBR	AUT	GER	HUN	BEL	ITA	EUR	MAL	JPN	**124**	**2nd**
1999	McLaren	Mercedes V10	**B**	Mika Häkkinen	**Ret**	**1**	**Ret**	**3**	**1**	1	2	**Ret**	**3**	**Ret**	**1**	**2**	**Ret**	5	3	1	**124**	**2nd**
1999	McLaren	Mercedes V10	**B**	David Coulthard	Ret	Ret	2	Ret	2	7	Ret	1	2	5	2	1	5	Ret	Ret	Ret	**124**	**2nd**

Awards
Preceded by McLaren MP4/13	Autosport; Racing Car Of The Year; 1999	Succeeded by Ferrari F1-2000
