= Sauber C19 =

Racing automobile

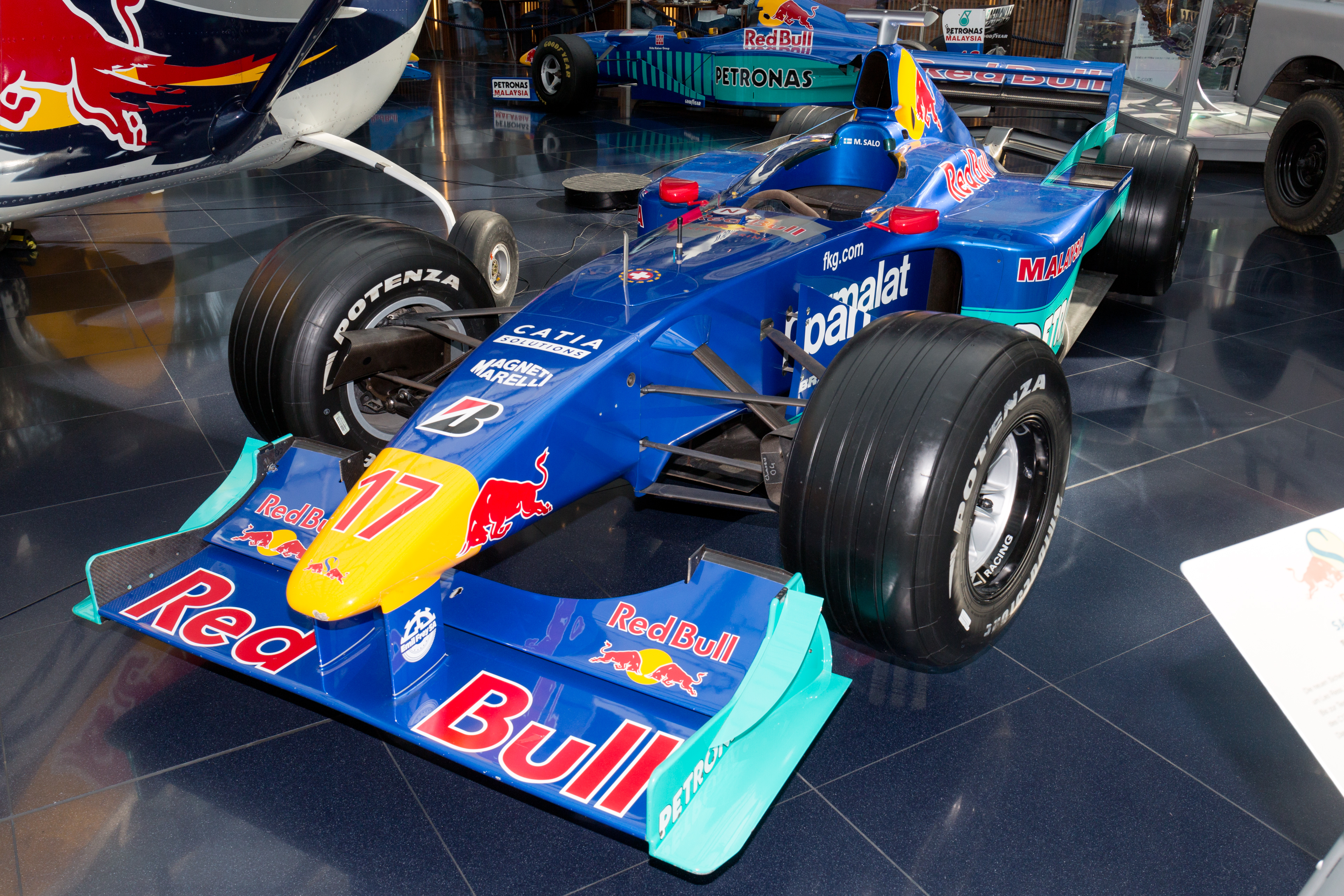
- The C19 of Mika Salo on display at the Hangar-7 Museum
- Category: Formula One
- Constructor: Sauber
- Designers: Leo Ress (Technical Director); Osamu Goto (Engine Director); Sergio Rinland (Chief Designer); Ian Thomson (Head of Chassis Design); Seamus Mullarkey (Head of Aerodynamics); Mike Jennings (Chief Aerodynamicist)
- Predecessor: Sauber C18
- Successor: Sauber C20

Technical specifications
- Chassis: Moulded carbon fibre composite structure
- Suspension (front): Double wishbones, pushrod
- Suspension (rear): Double wishbones, pushrod
- Engine: Petronas SPE 04A (Ferrari), 80-degree V10
- Transmission: Sauber seven-speed longitudinal semi-automatic
- Fuel: Shell
- Lubricants: Petronas
- Tyres: Bridgestone

Competition history
- Notable entrants: Red Bull Sauber Petronas
- Notable drivers: 16. (Brazil) Pedro Diniz; 17. (Finland) Mika Salo
- Debut: 2000 Australian Grand Prix
- Last event: 2000 Malaysian Grand Prix
Races	Wins	Poles	F/Laps
17	0	0	0
- Constructors' Championships: 0
- Drivers' Championships: 0

The Sauber C19 was the car with which the Sauber Formula One team competed in the 2000 Formula One World Championship. It was driven by the experienced pairing of Finn Mika Salo and Brazilian Pedro Diniz, who had previously been teammates at Arrows in 1998.

The C19 was the first Sauber Formula One car to utilize bespoke Petronas Syntium lubricants after three seasons utilizing Shell Helix lubricants.

== Design ==
This car introduced twin front suspension mounting pylons, a design that would be used enhanced the following year.

== Season overview ==
The car proved to be reasonably competitive, but not enough to escape from the large midfield group. Salo scored six points, but could not resist an offer from the fledgling Toyota team and left after the season finished, whilst Diniz failed to score any points and was dropped at the end of the year. The team finished eighth in the Constructors' Championship – same position as in 1999, but with more points.

The team experienced one of the worst races of its F1 career at the Brazilian Grand Prix, when both cars were withdrawn from the race after repeated rear wing failures caused by the bumpy track surface.

== Sponsorship and livery ==
The car retained the same blue and cyan livery from the previous two seasons. This was the last time the Red Bull logos were present on the airbox and nosecone along with a few retained sponsors. Parmalat sponsorship would be terminated from the team, prior to Diniz' departure.

A Malaysian flag on the engine cover at the Malaysian Grand Prix.

== Complete Formula One results ==
(key) (results in bold indicate pole position)

Year	Team	Engine	Tyres	Drivers	1	2	3	4	5	6	7	8	9	10	11	12	13	14	15	16	17	Points	WCC
2000	Red Bull Sauber Petronas	Petronas V10	**B**		AUS	BRA	SMR	GBR	ESP	EUR	MON	CAN	FRA	AUT	GER	HUN	BEL	ITA	USA	JPN	MAL	6	8th
2000	Red Bull Sauber Petronas	Petronas V10	**B**	(Brazil) Pedro Diniz	Ret	WD	8	11	Ret	7	Ret	10	11	9	Ret	Ret	11	8	8	11	Ret	6	8th
2000	Red Bull Sauber Petronas	Petronas V10	**B**	(Finland) Mika Salo	DSQ	WD	6	8	7	Ret	5	Ret	10	6	5	10	9	7	Ret	10	8	6	8th
