= 1999 Formula One World Championship =

53rd season of FIA Formula One motor racing

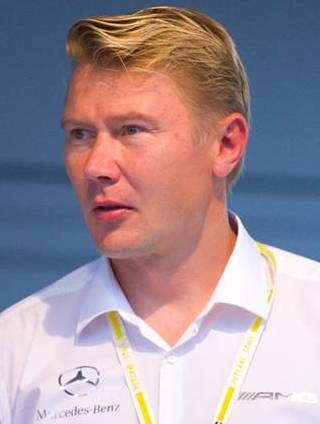
Defending world champion Mika Häkkinen (pictured in 2009) won his second and final title with McLaren.

Eddie Irvine (pictured in 1994) finished runner-up for Ferrari by just two points in his last year with the team.

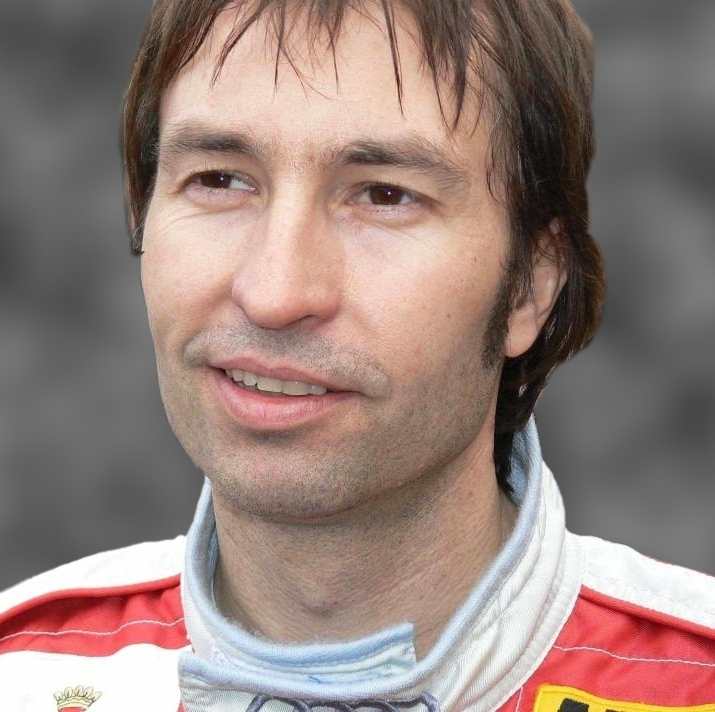
Heinz-Harald Frentzen (pictured in 2006) finished the season third for Jordan.

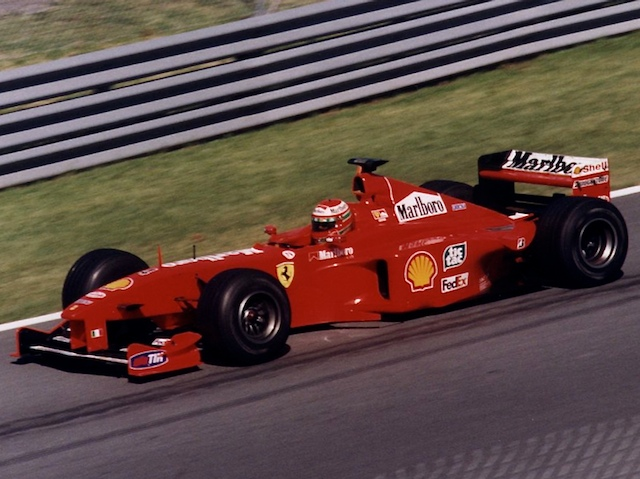
Ferrari won the Constructors' Championship.

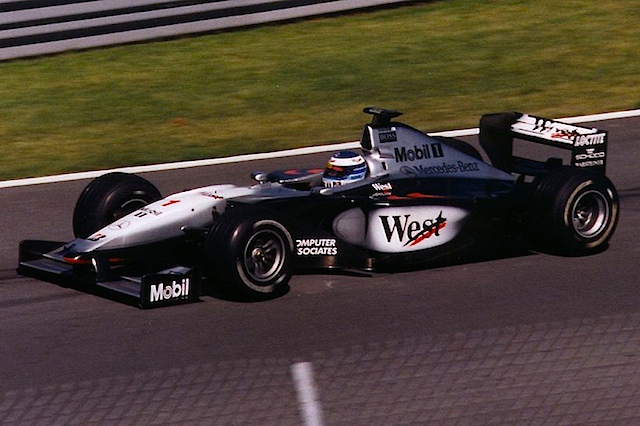
McLaren Mercedes placed second in the Constructors' Championship.

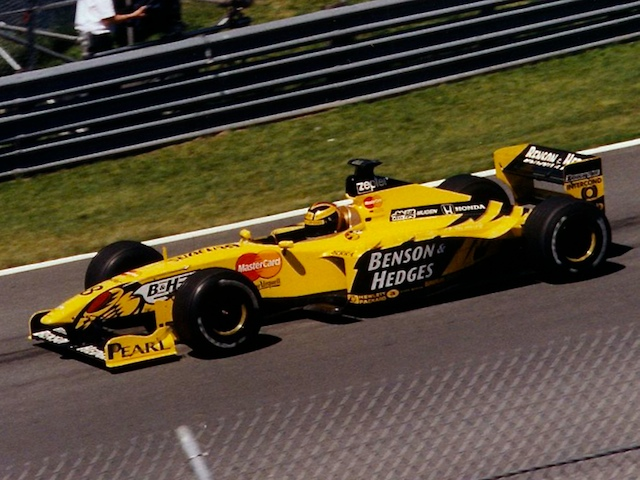
Jordan Mugen-Honda placed third in the Constructors' Championship.

The 1999 FIA Formula One World Championship was the 53rd season of FIA Formula One motor racing. It featured the 1999 Formula One World Championship for Drivers and the 1999 Formula One World Championship for Constructors, which were contested concurrently over a sixteen-race series that commenced on 7 March and ended on 31 October.

Defending champion Mika Häkkinen was again awarded the World Drivers' Championship. His team McLaren just missed out: it was Ferrari that clinched the World Constructors' Championship by a margin of four points. It would be the last Drivers' title for a McLaren driver until Lewis Hamilton in 2008. It was Ferrari's first Constructors' title since 1983, but would also mark the first of six successive titles up to 2004. Away from the frontrunners, the season proved to be a disastrous one for the new British American Racing (BAR) team with their star driver and 1997 world champion Jacques Villeneuve, who despite high pre-season expectations failed to score a single point during the season, being the only one of the eleven teams entered not to score.

It was also the final season for 1996 world champion Damon Hill.

== Drivers and constructors ==
The following teams and drivers competed in the 1999 FIA Formula One World Championship. All teams competed with tyres supplied by Bridgestone.

Entrant	Constructor	Chassis	Engine^{†}	No.	Driver	Rounds
(United Kingdom) West McLaren Mercedes	McLaren-Mercedes	MP4/14	Mercedes FO110H	1	(Finland) Mika Häkkinen	All
(United Kingdom) West McLaren Mercedes	McLaren-Mercedes	MP4/14	Mercedes FO110H	2	(United Kingdom) David Coulthard	All
(Italy) Scuderia Ferrari Marlboro	Ferrari	F399	Ferrari Tipo 048	3	(Germany) Michael Schumacher	1–8, 15–16
(Italy) Scuderia Ferrari Marlboro	Ferrari	F399	Ferrari Tipo 048	3	(Finland) Mika Salo	9–14
(Italy) Scuderia Ferrari Marlboro	Ferrari	F399	Ferrari Tipo 048	4	(United Kingdom) Eddie Irvine	All
(United Kingdom) Winfield Williams	Williams-Supertec	FW21	Supertec FB01	5	(Italy) Alessandro Zanardi	All
(United Kingdom) Winfield Williams	Williams-Supertec	FW21	Supertec FB01	6	(Germany) Ralf Schumacher	All
(Republic of Ireland) Benson and Hedges Jordan	Jordan-Mugen-Honda	199	Mugen-Honda MF-301HD	7	(United Kingdom) Damon Hill	All
(Republic of Ireland) Benson and Hedges Jordan	Jordan-Mugen-Honda	199	Mugen-Honda MF-301HD	8	(Germany) Heinz-Harald Frentzen	All
(Italy) Mild Seven Benetton Playlife	Benetton-Playlife	B199	Playlife FB01	9	(Italy) Giancarlo Fisichella	All
(Italy) Mild Seven Benetton Playlife	Benetton-Playlife	B199	Playlife FB01	10	(Austria) Alexander Wurz	All
(Switzerland) Red Bull Sauber Petronas	Sauber-Petronas	C18	Petronas SPE-03A	11	(France) Jean Alesi	All
(Switzerland) Red Bull Sauber Petronas	Sauber-Petronas	C18	Petronas SPE-03A	12	(Brazil) Pedro Diniz	All
(United Kingdom) Repsol Arrows F1 Team	Arrows	A20	Arrows A20E	14	(Spain) Pedro de la Rosa	All
(United Kingdom) Repsol Arrows F1 Team	Arrows	A20	Arrows A20E	15	(Japan) Toranosuke Takagi	All
(United Kingdom) HSBC Stewart Ford	Stewart-Ford	SF3	Ford CR-1	16	(Brazil) Rubens Barrichello	All
(United Kingdom) HSBC Stewart Ford	Stewart-Ford	SF3	Ford CR-1	17	(United Kingdom) Johnny Herbert	All
(France) Gauloises Prost Peugeot	Prost-Peugeot	AP02	Peugeot A18	18	(France) Olivier Panis	All
(France) Gauloises Prost Peugeot	Prost-Peugeot	AP02	Peugeot A18	19	(Italy) Jarno Trulli	All
(Italy) Fondmetal Minardi Team	Minardi-Ford	M01	Ford VJM1 Zetec-R; Ford VJM2 Zetec-R	20	(Italy) Luca Badoer	1, 3–16
(Italy) Fondmetal Minardi Team	Minardi-Ford	M01	Ford VJM1 Zetec-R; Ford VJM2 Zetec-R	20	(France) Stéphane Sarrazin	2
(Italy) Fondmetal Minardi Team	Minardi-Ford	M01	Ford VJM1 Zetec-R; Ford VJM2 Zetec-R	21	(Spain) Marc Gené	All
(United Kingdom) British American Racing	BAR-Supertec	01	Supertec FB01	22	(Canada) Jacques Villeneuve	All
(United Kingdom) British American Racing	BAR-Supertec	01	Supertec FB01	23	(Brazil) Ricardo Zonta	1–2, 6–16
(United Kingdom) British American Racing	BAR-Supertec	01	Supertec FB01	23	(Finland) Mika Salo	3–5

^{†} All engines were 3.0 litre, V10 configuration.

=== Team changes ===
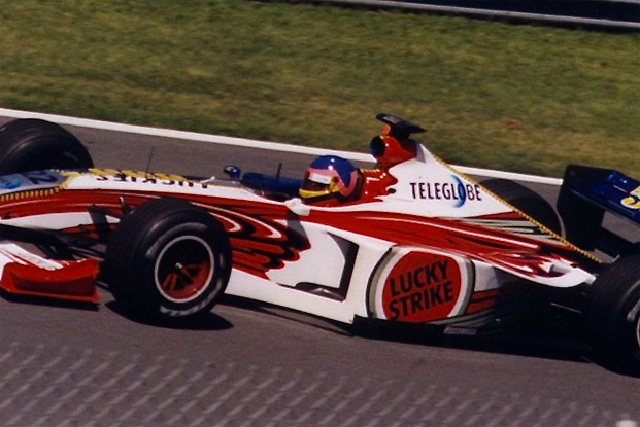
Jacques Villeneuve joined the new BAR team for 1999.

After three decades in the sport, the Tyrrell team was sold to British American Tobacco and its entry was used by the new British American Racing (BAR) team, with Renault-based Supertec engines replacing the Ford-Cosworth units of the previous season.

In 1998, Goodyear supplied tires to five teams, but when the company withdrew from the sport after 34 years, it left Bridgestone as the sole tire supplier.

The Mecachrome engines used by Williams in 1998 were rebadged as Supertec units.

=== Driver changes ===
Williams entered the season with an all-new driver pairing: Ralf Schumacher (driving for Jordan in 1998) and Alessandro Zanardi. The Italian had last driven in F1 for Lotus in 1994. In the years between, he had won the 1997 and 1998 CART championships for Chip Ganassi Racing.

Heinz-Harald Frentzen completed a straight swap with the younger Schumacher, taking the vacant seat at Jordan alongside 1996 champion Damon Hill. Frentzen's 1998 teammate, the 1997 champion Jacques Villeneuve, moved to the newly founded British American Racing (BAR) team. He was partnered with McLaren test driver and FIA GT1 champion Ricardo Zonta, one of three F1 rookies on the grid at the beginning of the season.

1998 Tyrrell driver Ricardo Rosset had retired from racing, while his teammate Toranosuke Takagi moved to Arrows. He was joined by Jordan's test driver from last year, Pedro de la Rosa, who also made his debut as a Grand Prix driver. Pedro Diniz left Arrows for Sauber.

Johnny Herbert, whose Sauber seat was taken by Diniz, joined Rubens Barrichello at Stewart. Stewart's drivers from 1998 were both absent from the Formula One grid this year: Jan Magnussen moved to the American Le Mans Series, while Jos Verstappen became the test driver for the Honda F1 project, which was later aborted.

Finally, Minardi also fielded a completely new driver pairing: Luca Badoer (who had last driven for Forti in 1996 but became Ferrari test driver in the following years) and the third rookie driver, reigning Open Fortuna by Nissan champion Marc Gené. Their previous drivers Shinji Nakano and Esteban Tuero became a test driver for Jordan and driver in the Argentinian TC 2000 Championship, respectively.

==== Mid-season changes ====
A wrist injury to Luca Badoer led to Prost test driver Stéphane Sarrazin making his F1 debut at the Brazilian Grand Prix. It would end up being the Frenchman's only ever race in the series.

Mika Salo, driving for Arrows in 1998, was left without a full-time drive for 1999, but he later served as an injury replacement for both Ricardo Zonta for three races (after his accident during practice of the Brazilian Grand Prix), and Ferrari's Michael Schumacher for six races after the latter broke his leg at Silverstone. He scored one second place and one third for Ferrari.

== Calendar ==
The 1999 FIA Formula One World Championship comprised the following 16 races.

Round	Grand Prix	Circuit	Date
1	Australian Grand Prix	(Australia) Albert Park Circuit, Melbourne	7 March
2	Brazilian Grand Prix	(Brazil) Autódromo José Carlos Pace, São Paulo	11 April
3	San Marino Grand Prix	(Italy) Autodromo Enzo e Dino Ferrari, Imola	2 May
4	Monaco Grand Prix	Circuit de Monaco, Monte-Carlo	16 May
5	Spanish Grand Prix	(Spain) Circuit de Catalunya, Montmeló	30 May
6	Canadian Grand Prix	(Canada) Circuit Gilles Villeneuve, Montreal	13 June
7	French Grand Prix	(France) Circuit de Nevers Magny-Cours, Magny-Cours	27 June
8	British Grand Prix	(United Kingdom) Silverstone Circuit, Silverstone	11 July
9	Austrian Grand Prix	(Austria) A1-Ring, Spielberg	25 July
10	German Grand Prix	(Germany) Hockenheimring, Hockenheim	1 August
11	Hungarian Grand Prix	(Hungary) Hungaroring, Mogyoród	15 August
12	Belgian Grand Prix	(Belgium) Circuit de Spa-Francorchamps, Stavelot	29 August
13	Italian Grand Prix	(Italy) Autodromo Nazionale di Monza, Monza	12 September
14	European Grand Prix	(Germany) Nürburgring, Nürburg	26 September
15	Malaysian Grand Prix	(Malaysia) Sepang International Circuit, Kuala Lumpur	17 October
16	Japanese Grand Prix	(Japan) Suzuka Circuit, Suzuka	31 October

=== Calendar changes and proposed races ===
- The Malaysian Grand Prix was added to the calendar, held at a newly built circuit in Sepang.
- There were proposals for a Chinese Grand Prix to be held at the Zhuhai International Circuit. The race was included on the provisional calendar, with 21 March as its date, released on 15 October 1998. The race was removed from the calendar on 20 December 1998, due to unspecified problems. The race was proposed to be moved to the autumn but this did not occur. The Chinese Grand Prix ultimately joined the calendar in 2004, with the event held at the Shanghai International Circuit.
- The Argentine Grand Prix was added to the calendar on 20 December 1998 as a replacement for the cancelled Chinese Grand Prix, to be held at the Autódromo Juan y Oscar Gálvez as the second round of the season on 28 March, but was cancelled as well because of disagreements between the organizer and the commercial rights holder. This resulted in a five-week gap between the year's opening two races.
- The race at the Nurburgring was held under the European Grand Prix title once more, having been held under the Luxembourg Grand Prix title in the 1997 and 1998 season.

== Regulation changes ==
For 1999, there were only minor changes to the technical regulations.

- The grooved tyres introduced in 1998 now had four grooves on all tyres; the front tyres previously had three.
- The front tyres were made a bit narrower: 355 mm (14.0 in) maximum instead of 380 mm (15 in). The maximum width of the rear tyres remained at 380 mm (15 in).
- Wheels also were required to be tethered to the chassis in order to prevent them flying off in a crash.
- Frontal crash tests would be conducted at 13 m/s (43 ft/s), up from 12 m/s (39 ft/s).

== Season summary ==
=== Rounds 1 to 4 ===
The first round of the championship was in Australia and, unsurprisingly, the two McLarens of Mika Häkkinen and David Coulthard started on the front row. Ferrari's Michael Schumacher qualified in third. Just like last year's final race, however, Schumacher stalled on the warm-up lap and had to start at the back of the grid. So the McLarens were first and second into the first corner and pulled away, until both suddenly broke down: Coulthard when his gearbox failed and Häkkinen with electrical trouble. This left Eddie Irvine in the second Ferrari to take his first ever win ahead of Jordan's Heinz-Harald Frentzen and Ralf Schumacher in the Williams.

After the cancellation of two proposed races left an unusual five-week gap in the calendar, the Grand Prix circus struck down in Brazil. Häkkinen and Coulthard started 1–2 again, with home hero Rubens Barrichello in third for Stewart. This time, Coulthard faltered at the start and he had to be pushed into the pitlane. He rejoined three laps down on the rest of the field. Häkkinen looked dominant, but when he got stuck in third gear, he was passed by Barrichello and Michael Schumacher. Barrichello was on a two-stopper and pitted early, leaving Schumacher in first, only to be jumped by a recovering Häkkinen during the pit stops. Häkkinen won ahead of Schumacher, and Frentzen took third after Barrichello's engine blew up.

The first European race of the season took place at Imola, and even though the tifosi were out in full force for Ferrari, McLaren locked out the front row of the grid for the third successive race. Schumacher and Irvine were confined to the second row. Häkkinen, who was on a two-stopper, raced away from the field early on, only to lose control and crash on the 18th lap. This left Coulthard and Schumacher to battle it out, and the German jumped his rival in the stops to win, sending the tifosi wild. Coulthard came home in second and Barrichello took third after Irvine retired with an engine failure.

Häkkinen took pole again at Monaco, but this time, Schumacher prevented a lockout of the front row. Schumacher actually beat Häkkinen on the run to the first corner and then pulled away. Both Irvine and Coulthard gained a place when Häkkinen went up an escape road at Mirabeau, but soon after, Coulthard retired from third with a mechanical failure. Schumacher won by half a minute, with Irvine making it a Ferrari 1–2, and Häkkinen had to be content with the last podium spot.

With a quarter of the season gone, Schumacher led the championship with 26 points and teammate Irvine was second with 18. Häkkinen was third with 14, 12 points behind Schumacher, and only one point ahead of fourth-placed Frentzen. In the Constructors' Championship, Ferrari with 44 points had a big lead over McLaren with 20, and Jordan with 16.

=== Rounds 5 to 8 ===
For the next race in Spain, Mika Häkkinen took pole position as usual ahead of Eddie Irvine, teammate David Coulthard and Michael Schumacher. Both Ferraris got away poorly, Irvine was passed by Coulthard and both were passed by Jacques Villeneuve in the BAR. The McLarens disappeared into the distance and cruised to a 1–2 finish (Häkkinen before Coulthard), while the Ferraris finally got by Villeneuve at the pit stops, Schumacher finishing third.

It was at the Canadian GP that Häkkinen's string of poles was broken, the Finn being pushed to second by Schumacher. The front two maintained their positions at the start and pulled away. Schumacher led until he hit the infamous Wall of Champions and retired. After one of the safety car periods, Coulthard tried to overtake Irvine, but they collided and spun off. Coulthard's miseries ensued when he ignored the red light at the end of the pit lane and was handed a stop-go penalty. All this left Heinz-Harald Frentzen in second, only for him to crash heavily with a brake failure 4 laps from the end. This brought out the safety car until the end of the race, thus making it the first ever race to finish behind the safety car. Häkkinen won from a surprising Giancarlo Fisichella and the recovering Irvine.

Qualifying for the next race in France was disrupted by rain, and it resulted in Rubens Barrichello taking pole ahead of Jean Alesi's Sauber and Olivier Panis's Prost. Coulthard was fourth, Schumacher sixth and Häkkinen way down in 14th. The race was no drier, and the entire race was run in wet conditions. Barrichello led for the first few laps until Coulthard passed him, only for the Scot to retire with a gearbox failure. Häkkinen quickly charged up to second, only to spin and undo his hard work. Schumacher was now second, and soon passed Barrichello to take the lead. He pulled away, but then suffered an electrical problem, which cost him a lot of time and handed the lead back to Barrichello. Nearing the end of the race, Häkkinen completed his comeback by passing Barrichello to lead, but then both of them, with most other front-runners, had to stop for extra fuel. Frentzen started with a full tank and took the second win of his career, ahead of Häkkinen and Barrichello.

It seemed that normal service resumed in Great Britain, with Häkkinen on pole ahead of Schumacher and Coulthard. Häkkinen started well, but Schumacher was passed by Coulthard and Irvine. Although the race was suspended, because two cars were stalled on the grid, Schumacher raced down to Stowe corner and tried to retake Irvine's place, when his brakes failed and he was pitched him into the tire barrier at 320 kph (200 mph). Schumacher sustained a broken leg and thus his potential as a Drivers' World Championship contender was cut short. After the restart, Häkkinen pulled away from Irvine and Coulthard and looked set to win until one of his rear wheels suddenly became detached. This led to his retirement and handed the lead to Coulthard, who had jumped Irvine in the stops. Coulthard went on to take a victory on home soil, ahead of Irvine and Ralf Schumacher.

With half of the championship complete, Häkkinen led the championship with 40 points. Schumacher was second with 32, but he was expected to miss the rest of the season. Irvine also stood on 32 points and suddenly had to become the new team leader. Frentzen was fourth with 26 and Coulthard was fifth with 22. In the Constructors' Championship, Ferrari led with 64, two ahead of McLaren with 62. Jordan were third with 31.

=== Rounds 9 to 12 ===
The news before the round in Austria was that Mika Salo was hired as Michael Schumacher's replacement. The two McLarens were dominant in qualifying per usual: Mika Häkkinen on pole with David Coulthard second. Eddie Irvine started in third and Salo in seventh for his debut with Ferrari. Häkkinen got off well, but was tipped into a spin at the second corner by his teammate. He sustained no damage, but was demoted to last place. Coulthard led for most of the race, but Irvine jumped him in the second round of pit stops to take the win ahead of the Scot. Häkkinen charged back to finish third.

The German GP saw Häkkinen taking his eighth pole of the season. This time, Heinz-Harald Frentzen split the McLarens to start in second place. Häkkinen raced away and Coulthard passed Frentzen, but Salo, starting in fourth, actually got in front of both of them. Coulthard put Salo under pressure and tried to pass, but hit the Ferrari's tire and damaged his front wing, which forced him to pit for repairs. Häkkinen was cruising, but his refuelling equipment malfunctioned during the stops, and the delay pushed him down to fourth. He repassed Frentzen and set off after the Ferraris, only to suffer a puncture and crashed into the wall. Irvine was let through by Salo and took his second consecutive win, with Salo making it a Ferrari 1–2, and Frentzen finished third.

Round eleven took place in Hungary and Häkkinen took pole as usual, with Irvine alongside him and Coulthard third. Häkkinen and Irvine quickly raced away, while Coulthard got passed by Giancarlo Fisichella and Frentzen. Coulthard jumped both drivers in the stops and then chased after Irvine. The Ulsterman cracked under the pressure with eight laps left, by running wide and thus settling for third position. Häkkinen cruised to victory and Coulthard completed McLaren's 1–2.

The field went to Belgium next and Häkkinen took his tenth pole of the season, with Coulthard in second and Frentzen third. At the start, Häkkinen got away slowly and opened the door for Coulthard. The McLarens touched, but Coulthard came out on top. He was never headed and eased to victory, with Häkkinen finishing second and Frentzen third. Irvine finished fourth.

With three-quarters of the season complete, Häkkinen led the championship with 60 points, but Irvine with 59 was only 1 point behind him. Coulthard was third with 46, and in with an outside chance. Frentzen was fourth with 40 and Schumacher, not having raced since the British GP was still on 32. In the Constructors' Championship, consecutive 1–2 finishes had given McLaren the lead with 106 points. Ferrari with 97 was only 9 points behind them. Jordan was third with 47.

=== Rounds 13 to 16 ===
In Italy, Mika Häkkinen took his eleventh and what would be his last pole position of the season, ahead of Heinz-Harald Frentzen and David Coulthard. He led into the first corner and pulled away, helped by Alessandro Zanardi, who got up to second but then held up his rivals. Häkkinen was set to win until he spun off at the first corner on lap 30, handing the lead to Frentzen who went on to win ahead of Ralf Schumacher in the Williams and Mika Salo in the Ferrari. This promoted Frentzen to third place in the championship, at the cost of Coulthard, and his sixth place brought Eddie Irvine level with Häkkinen at the top of the standings.

At the European Grand Prix, Frentzen took his second and last career pole, ahead of Coulthard and Häkkinen. After two aborted starts, Frentzen led Häkkinen and Coulthard into the first corner, but at the back of the pack, Damon Hill got away slow because of an electrical failure. This caused Alexander Wurz to hit Pedro Diniz. The Sauber driver rolled upside down and his rollbar failed, but Diniz escaped uninjured. After 15 laps, a slight drizzle fell and Häkkinen pitted for rain tires. He was the only one and it turned out to be a mistake. He lost a lot of time when he had to pit again for dry tires and he rejoined a lap down. Irvine had a slow stop of 30 seconds when his team couldn't find the fourth wheel to put on and with half of the race gone, Frentzen was leading Coulthard and Ralf Schumacher. Frentzen's race cruelly ended with an electrical failure after his first stop and the new leader Coulthard spun off into retirement when the rain truly arrived. This handed the lead to Ralf until he suffered a puncture and fell back to fifth. Giancarlo Fisichella inherited the lead, but he also spun off and retired, so Johnny Herbert in the Stewart gained first place. And on a drying track, he held on to finish ahead of Jarno Trulli in the Prost and teammate Rubens Barrichello. Luca Badoer was set for a points finish for Minardi, but he suffered a gearbox failure. Häkkinen finished fifth and Irvine seventh, separating them by two points in the championship.

The first ever Malaysian GP was the host of the penultimate round. Michael Schumacher had recovered and replaced Salo. He took pole ahead of Irvine, with Coulthard and Häkkinen third and fourth. At the start, Schumacher handed the lead to Irvine for the championship and slowed down to keep both McLarens behind. Coulthard finally got in front, only for his car to break down. Schumacher kept Häkkinen behind to complete a Ferrari 1–2 finish, giving Irvine a four-point lead going into the last race. After the race, the Ferrari cars were found to be illegal by an FIA official and were disqualified, which would make Häkkinen the world champion instantly. However, Ferrari won their case of appeal and their results were reinstated. In the Constructors' Championship, Ferrari led with 118 points, in front of McLaren with 114; Jordan with 58 were a lonely third.

The championship decider took place in Japan. Häkkinen qualified in second, behind Schumacher, while Irvine crashed in qualifying and was only fifth. Häkkinen took the lead at the start, while Irvine was fourth behind Olivier Panis. Häkkinen and Schumacher got away, while Panis held up the others. At the first round of stops, Irvine got in front of Panis but then had to deal with Coulthard. The McLaren slowed his pace and held Irvine up to increase the gap to Häkkinen. Irvine was finally released when Coulthard spun off, but was well over a minute behind the lead. Schumacher was within five seconds of Häkkinen, and piled on the pressure, but Häkkinen kept him at bay to win the race.

Reigning champion Häkkinen was awarded the 1999 Drivers' Championship with 76 points, two points ahead of Irvine. Frentzen was third (54 points), ahead of Coulthard (48 points) and Michael Schumacher (44 points). In the Constructors' Championship, Ferrari beat McLaren by four points. Jordan ended up in third.

== Results and standings ==
=== Grands Prix ===
Round	Grand Prix	Pole position	Fastest lap	Winning driver	Constructor	Report
1	(Australia) Australian Grand Prix	(Finland) Mika Häkkinen	(Germany) Michael Schumacher	(United Kingdom) Eddie Irvine	(Italy) Ferrari	Report
2	(Brazil) Brazilian Grand Prix	(Finland) Mika Häkkinen	(Finland) Mika Häkkinen	(Finland) Mika Häkkinen	(United Kingdom) McLaren-Mercedes	Report
3	(Italy) San Marino Grand Prix	(Finland) Mika Häkkinen	(Germany) Michael Schumacher	(Germany) Michael Schumacher	(Italy) Ferrari	Report
4	Monaco Grand Prix	(Finland) Mika Häkkinen	(Finland) Mika Häkkinen	(Germany) Michael Schumacher	(Italy) Ferrari	Report
5	(Spain) Spanish Grand Prix	(Finland) Mika Häkkinen	(Germany) Michael Schumacher	(Finland) Mika Häkkinen	(United Kingdom) McLaren-Mercedes	Report
6	(Canada) Canadian Grand Prix	(Germany) Michael Schumacher	(United Kingdom) Eddie Irvine	(Finland) Mika Häkkinen	(United Kingdom) McLaren-Mercedes	Report
7	(France) French Grand Prix	(Brazil) Rubens Barrichello	(United Kingdom) David Coulthard	(Germany) Heinz-Harald Frentzen	(Republic of Ireland) Jordan-Mugen-Honda	Report
8	(United Kingdom) British Grand Prix	(Finland) Mika Häkkinen	(Finland) Mika Häkkinen	(United Kingdom) David Coulthard	(United Kingdom) McLaren-Mercedes	Report
9	(Austria) Austrian Grand Prix	(Finland) Mika Häkkinen	(Finland) Mika Häkkinen	(United Kingdom) Eddie Irvine	(Italy) Ferrari	Report
10	(Germany) German Grand Prix	(Finland) Mika Häkkinen	(United Kingdom) David Coulthard	(United Kingdom) Eddie Irvine	(Italy) Ferrari	Report
11	(Hungary) Hungarian Grand Prix	(Finland) Mika Häkkinen	(United Kingdom) David Coulthard	(Finland) Mika Häkkinen	(United Kingdom) McLaren-Mercedes	Report
12	(Belgium) Belgian Grand Prix	(Finland) Mika Häkkinen	(Finland) Mika Häkkinen	(United Kingdom) David Coulthard	(United Kingdom) McLaren-Mercedes	Report
13	(Italy) Italian Grand Prix	(Finland) Mika Häkkinen	(Germany) Ralf Schumacher	(Germany) Heinz-Harald Frentzen	(Republic of Ireland) Jordan-Mugen-Honda	Report
14	(Germany) European Grand Prix	(Germany) Heinz-Harald Frentzen	(Finland) Mika Häkkinen	(United Kingdom) Johnny Herbert	(United Kingdom) Stewart-Ford	Report
15	(Malaysia) Malaysian Grand Prix	(Germany) Michael Schumacher	(Germany) Michael Schumacher	(United Kingdom) Eddie Irvine	(Italy) Ferrari	Report
16	(Japan) Japanese Grand Prix	(Germany) Michael Schumacher	(Germany) Michael Schumacher	(Finland) Mika Häkkinen	(United Kingdom) McLaren-Mercedes	Report

=== Scoring system ===
Points were awarded to the top six finishers in each race as follows:

Position	1st	2nd	3rd	4th	5th	6th
Points	10	6	4	3	2	1

=== World Drivers' Championship standings ===
Pos.	Driver	AUS (Australia)	BRA (Brazil)	SMR (Italy)	MON (Monaco)	ESP (Spain)	CAN (Canada)	FRA (France)	GBR (United Kingdom)	AUT (Austria)	GER (Germany)	HUN (Hungary)	BEL (Belgium)	ITA (Italy)	EUR (Germany)	MAL (Malaysia)	JPN (Japan)	Points
1	(Finland) Mika Häkkinen	Ret^{P}	1^{P}^{F}	Ret^{P}	3^{P}^{F}	1^{P}	1	2	Ret^{P}^{F}	3^{P}^{F}	Ret^{P}	1^{P}	2^{P}^{F}	Ret^{P}	5^{F}	3	1	76
2	(United Kingdom) Eddie Irvine	1	5	Ret	2	4	3^{F}	6	2	1	1	3	4	6	7	1	3	74
3	(Germany) Heinz-Harald Frentzen	2	3^{†}	Ret	4	Ret	11^{†}	1	4	4	3	4	3	1	Ret^{P}	6	4	54
4	(United Kingdom) David Coulthard	Ret	Ret	2	Ret	2	7	Ret^{F}	1	2	5^{F}	2^{F}	1	5	Ret	Ret	Ret	48
5	(Germany) Michael Schumacher	8^{F}	2	1^{F}	1	3^{F}	Ret^{P}	5	DNS							2^{P}^{F}	2^{P}^{F}	44
6	(Germany) Ralf Schumacher	3	4	Ret	Ret	5	4	4	3	Ret	4	9	5	2^{F}	4	Ret	5	35
7	(Brazil) Rubens Barrichello	5	Ret	3	9^{†}	DSQ	Ret	3^{P}	8	Ret	Ret	5	10	4	3	5	8	21
8	(United Kingdom) Johnny Herbert	DNS	Ret	10^{†}	Ret	Ret	5	Ret	12	14	11^{†}	11	Ret	Ret	1	4	7	15
9	(Italy) Giancarlo Fisichella	4	Ret	5	5	9	2	Ret	7	12^{†}	Ret	Ret	11	Ret	Ret	11	14^{†}	13
10	(Finland) Mika Salo			7^{†}	Ret	8				9	2	12	7	3	Ret			10
11	(Italy) Jarno Trulli	Ret	Ret	Ret	7	6	Ret	7	9	7	Ret	8	12	Ret	2	DNS	Ret	7
12	(United Kingdom) Damon Hill	Ret	Ret	4	Ret	7	Ret	Ret	5	8	Ret	6	6	10	Ret	Ret	Ret	7
13	(Austria) Alexander Wurz	Ret	7	Ret	6	10	Ret	Ret	10	5	7	7	14	Ret	Ret	8	10	3
14	(Brazil) Pedro Diniz	Ret	Ret	Ret	Ret	Ret	6	Ret	6	6	Ret	Ret	Ret	Ret	Ret	Ret	11	3
15	(France) Jean Alesi	Ret	Ret	6	Ret	Ret	Ret	Ret	14	Ret	8	16^{†}	9	9	Ret	7	6	2
16	(France) Olivier Panis	Ret	6	Ret	Ret	Ret	9	8	13	10	6	10	13	11^{†}	9	Ret	Ret	2
17	(Spain) Marc Gené	Ret	9	9	Ret	Ret	8	Ret	15	11	9	17	16	Ret	6	9	Ret	1
18	(Spain) Pedro de la Rosa	6	Ret	Ret	Ret	11	Ret	11	Ret	Ret	Ret	15	Ret	Ret	Ret	Ret	13	1
19	(Italy) Alessandro Zanardi	Ret	Ret	11^{†}	8	Ret	Ret	Ret	11	Ret	Ret	Ret	8	7	Ret	10	Ret	0
20	(Japan) Toranosuke Takagi	7	8	Ret	Ret	12	Ret	DSQ	16	Ret	Ret	Ret	Ret	Ret	Ret	Ret	Ret	0
21	(Canada) Jacques Villeneuve	Ret	Ret	Ret	Ret	Ret	Ret	Ret	Ret	Ret	Ret	Ret	15	8	10^{†}	Ret	9	0
22	(Brazil) Ricardo Zonta	Ret	DNQ				Ret	9	Ret	15^{†}	Ret	13	Ret	Ret	8	Ret	12	0
23	(Italy) Luca Badoer	Ret		8	Ret	Ret	10	10	Ret	13	10	14	Ret	Ret	Ret	Ret	Ret	0
24	(France) Stéphane Sarrazin		Ret															0
Pos.	Driver	AUS (Australia)	BRA (Brazil)	SMR (Italy)	MON (Monaco)	ESP (Spain)	CAN (Canada)	FRA (France)	GBR (United Kingdom)	AUT (Austria)	GER (Germany)	HUN (Hungary)	BEL (Belgium)	ITA (Italy)	EUR (Germany)	MAL (Malaysia)	JPN (Japan)	Points

Key
Colour	Result
Gold	Winner
Silver	Second place
Bronze	Third place
Green	Other points position
Blue	Other classified position
Blue	Not classified, finished (NC)
Purple	Not classified, retired (Ret)
Red	Did not qualify (DNQ)
Black	Disqualified (DSQ)
White	Did not start (DNS)
White	Race cancelled (C)
Blank	Did not practice (DNP)
Blank	Excluded (EX)
Blank	Did not arrive (DNA)
Blank	Withdrawn (WD)
Blank	Did not enter (empty cell)
Annotation	Meaning
P	Pole position
F	Fastest lap

Notes:

- † – Driver did not finish the Grand Prix but was classified, as he completed more than 90% of the race distance.
- Where two or more drivers scored the same number of points, their positions in the Drivers' Championship were fixed according to the quality of their places. Under this system, one first place was better than any number of second places, one second place was better than any number of third places, etc. For drivers with 1 point or 0 points, one seventh place was better than any number of eighth places, etc.

=== World Constructors' Championship standings ===
Pos.	Constructor	No.	AUS (Australia)	BRA (Brazil)	SMR (Italy)	MON (Monaco)	ESP (Spain)	CAN (Canada)	FRA (France)	GBR (United Kingdom)	AUT (Austria)	GER (Germany)	HUN (Hungary)	BEL (Belgium)	ITA (Italy)	EUR (Germany)	MAL (Malaysia)	JPN (Japan)	Points
1	(Italy) Ferrari	3	8^{F}	2	1^{F}	1	3^{F}	Ret^{P}	5	DNS	9	2	12	7	3	Ret	2^{P}^{F}	2^{P}^{F}	128
1	(Italy) Ferrari	4	1	5	Ret	2	4	3^{F}	6	2	1	1	3	4	6	7	1	3	128
2	(United Kingdom) McLaren-Mercedes	1	Ret^{P}	1^{P}^{F}	Ret^{P}	3^{P}^{F}	1^{P}	1	2	Ret^{P}^{F}	3^{P}^{F}	Ret^{P}	1^{P}	2^{P}^{F}	Ret^{P}	5^{F}	3	1	124
2	(United Kingdom) McLaren-Mercedes	2	Ret	Ret	2	Ret	2	7	Ret^{F}	1	2	5^{F}	2^{F}	1	5	Ret	Ret	Ret	124
3	(Republic of Ireland) Jordan-Mugen-Honda	7	Ret	Ret	4	Ret	7	Ret	Ret	5	8	Ret	6	6	10	Ret	Ret	Ret	61
3	(Republic of Ireland) Jordan-Mugen-Honda	8	2	3^{†}	Ret	4	Ret	11^{†}	1	4	4	3	4	3	1	Ret^{P}	6	4	61
4	(United Kingdom) Stewart-Ford	16	5	Ret	3	9^{†}	DSQ	Ret	3^{P}	8	Ret	Ret	5	10	4	3	5	8	36
4	(United Kingdom) Stewart-Ford	17	DNS	Ret	10^{†}	Ret	Ret	5	Ret	12	14	11^{†}	11	Ret	Ret	1	4	7	36
5	(United Kingdom) Williams-Supertec	5	Ret	Ret	11^{†}	8	Ret	Ret	Ret	11	Ret	Ret	Ret	8	7	Ret	10	Ret	35
5	(United Kingdom) Williams-Supertec	6	3	4	Ret	Ret	5	4	4	3	Ret	4	9	5	2^{F}	4	Ret	5	35
6	(Italy) Benetton-Playlife	9	4	Ret	5	5	9	2	Ret	7	12^{†}	Ret	Ret	11	Ret	Ret	11	14^{†}	16
6	(Italy) Benetton-Playlife	10	Ret	7	Ret	6	10	Ret	Ret	10	5	7	7	14	Ret	Ret	8	10	16
7	(France) Prost-Peugeot	18	Ret	6	Ret	Ret	Ret	9	8	13	10	6	10	13	11^{†}	9	Ret	Ret	9
7	(France) Prost-Peugeot	19	Ret	Ret	Ret	7	6	Ret	7	9	7	Ret	8	12	Ret	2	DNS	Ret	9
8	(Switzerland) Sauber-Petronas	11	Ret	Ret	6	Ret	Ret	Ret	Ret	14	Ret	8	16^{†}	9	9	Ret	7	6	5
8	(Switzerland) Sauber-Petronas	12	Ret	Ret	Ret	Ret	Ret	6	Ret	6	6	Ret	Ret	Ret	Ret	Ret	Ret	11	5
9	(United Kingdom) Arrows	14	6	Ret	Ret	Ret	11	Ret	11	Ret	Ret	Ret	15	Ret	Ret	Ret	Ret	13	1
9	(United Kingdom) Arrows	15	7	8	Ret	Ret	12	Ret	DSQ	16	Ret	Ret	Ret	Ret	Ret	Ret	Ret	Ret	1
10	(Italy) Minardi-Ford	20	Ret	Ret	8	Ret	Ret	10	10	Ret	13	10	14	Ret	Ret	Ret	Ret	Ret	1
10	(Italy) Minardi-Ford	21	Ret	9	9	Ret	Ret	8	Ret	15	11	9	17	16	Ret	6	9	Ret	1
11	(United Kingdom) BAR-Supertec	22	Ret	Ret	Ret	Ret	Ret	Ret	Ret	Ret	Ret	Ret	Ret	15	8	10^{†}	Ret	9	0
11	(United Kingdom) BAR-Supertec	23	Ret	DNQ	7^{†}	Ret	8	Ret	9	Ret	15^{†}	Ret	13	Ret	Ret	8	Ret	12	0
Pos.	Constructor	No.	AUS (Australia)	BRA (Brazil)	SMR (Italy)	MON (Monaco)	ESP (Spain)	CAN (Canada)	FRA (France)	GBR (United Kingdom)	AUT (Austria)	GER (Germany)	HUN (Hungary)	BEL (Belgium)	ITA (Italy)	EUR (Germany)	MAL (Malaysia)	JPN (Japan)	Points

Notes:

- † – Driver did not finish the Grand Prix but was classified, as he completed more than 90% of the race distance.
- Where two or more constructors scored the same number of points, their positions in the Constructors' Championship were fixed according to the quality of their places. Under this system, one first place was better than any number of second places, one second place was better than any number of third places, etc. For constructors with 1 point or 0 points, one seventh place was better than any number of eighth places, etc.
