= Toranosuke Takagi =

Japanese racing driver (born 1974)

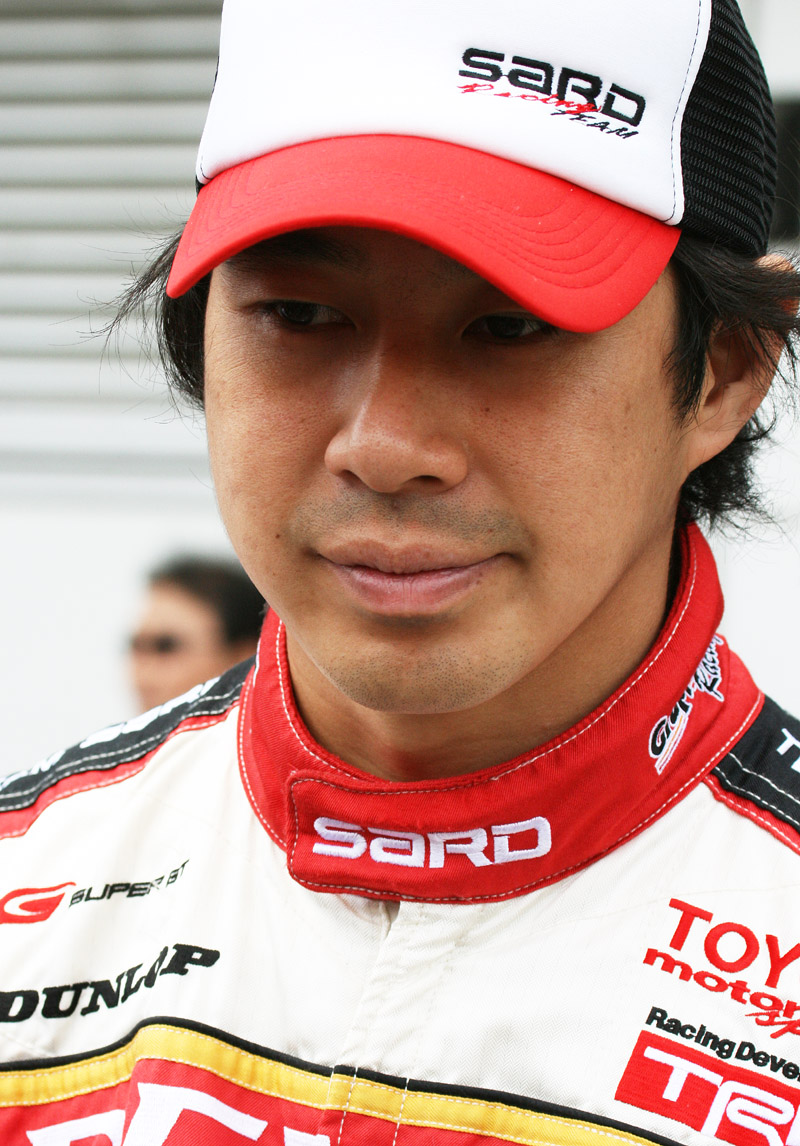
- In 2008, as a Super GT driver
- Born: 12 February 1974 (age 52); Shizuoka, Shizuoka Prefecture, Japan

Formula One World Championship career
- Nationality: (Japan) Japanese
- Active years: 1998–1999
- Team(s): Tyrrell, Arrows
- Entries: 32
- Championships: 0
- Wins: 0
- Podiums: 0
- Career points: 0
- Pole positions: 0
- Fastest laps: 0
- First entry: 1998 Australian Grand Prix
- Last entry: 1999 Japanese Grand Prix

Toranosuke "Tora" Takagi (高木 虎之介; born 12 February 1974) is a Japanese former racing driver, having notably competed in Formula One from 1998 to 1999 for Tyrrell and Arrows, having served as test driver for Tyrrell in 1997. Outside of Formula One, Takagi won the 2005 Super GT series in the GT500 class alongside Yuji Tachikawa, and the 2000 Formula Nippon Championship.

== Early career ==
Takagi was heavily influenced by his father, a touring car driver. In the early 1980s he began racing karts, competing in his first championship kart race in 1987. After winning several All Japan National Kart A2 Series races, Takagi ended his kart racing career in 1991 and began racing Formula Toyota in 1992. In 1993, he began competing in All Japan Formula Three, finishing tenth in his rookie season.

== Formula One ==
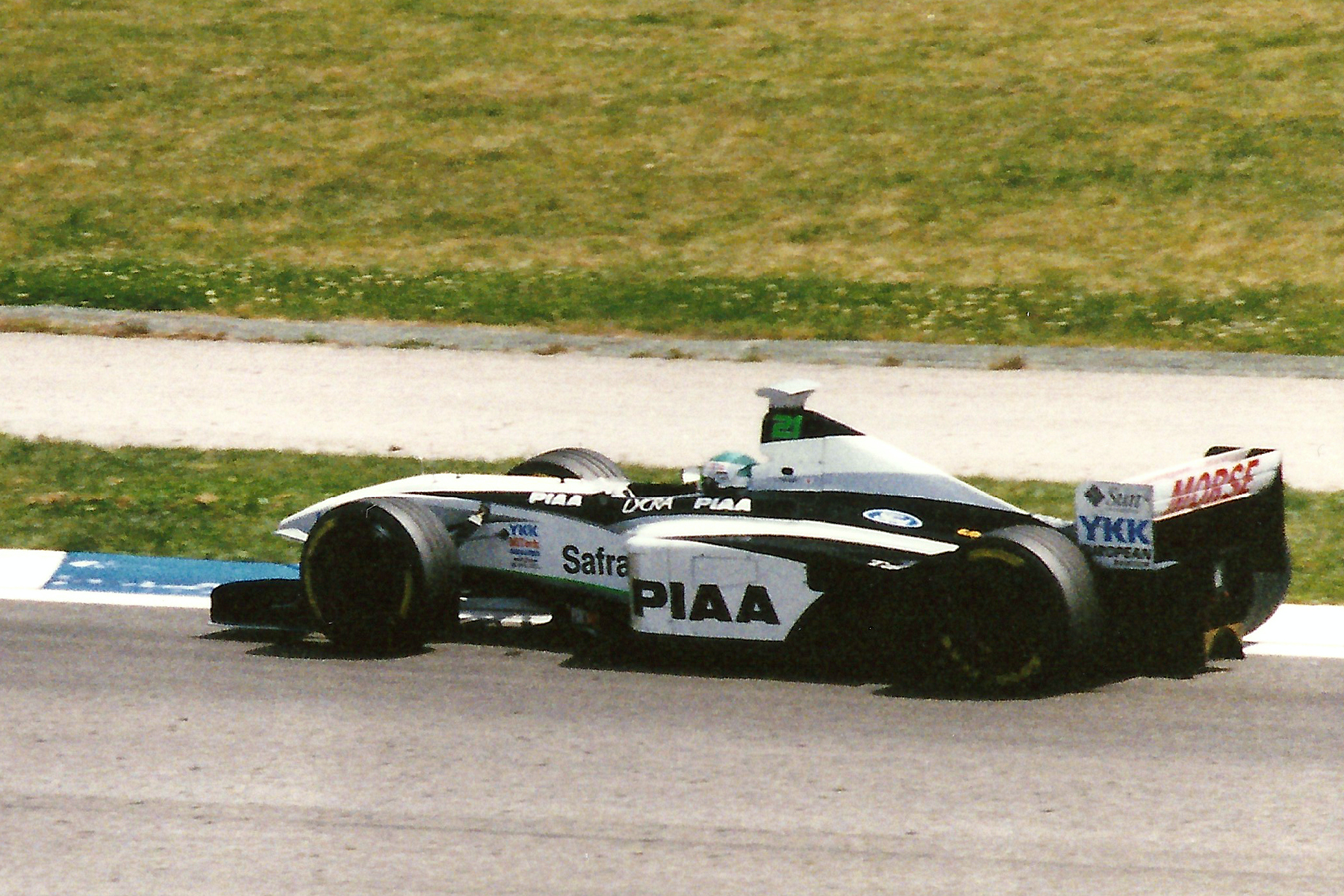
Takagi driving for Tyrrell at the 1998 Spanish Grand Prix.

During his performance in a 1994 race, Takagi drew the attention of Japanese Formula One driver Satoru Nakajima, joining the Nakajima Racing team and competing in Formula 3000. He was heavily involved in the team from 1995 until he was chosen as Tyrrell's Formula One test driver in 1997. He graduated to a race seat for 1998. Takagi later competed with the Arrows Formula One team, and his European popularity was on the rise. However, there were organizational and communication problems between Takagi and both teams, and he left Formula One at the end of the 1999 season.

== Post–Formula One career ==
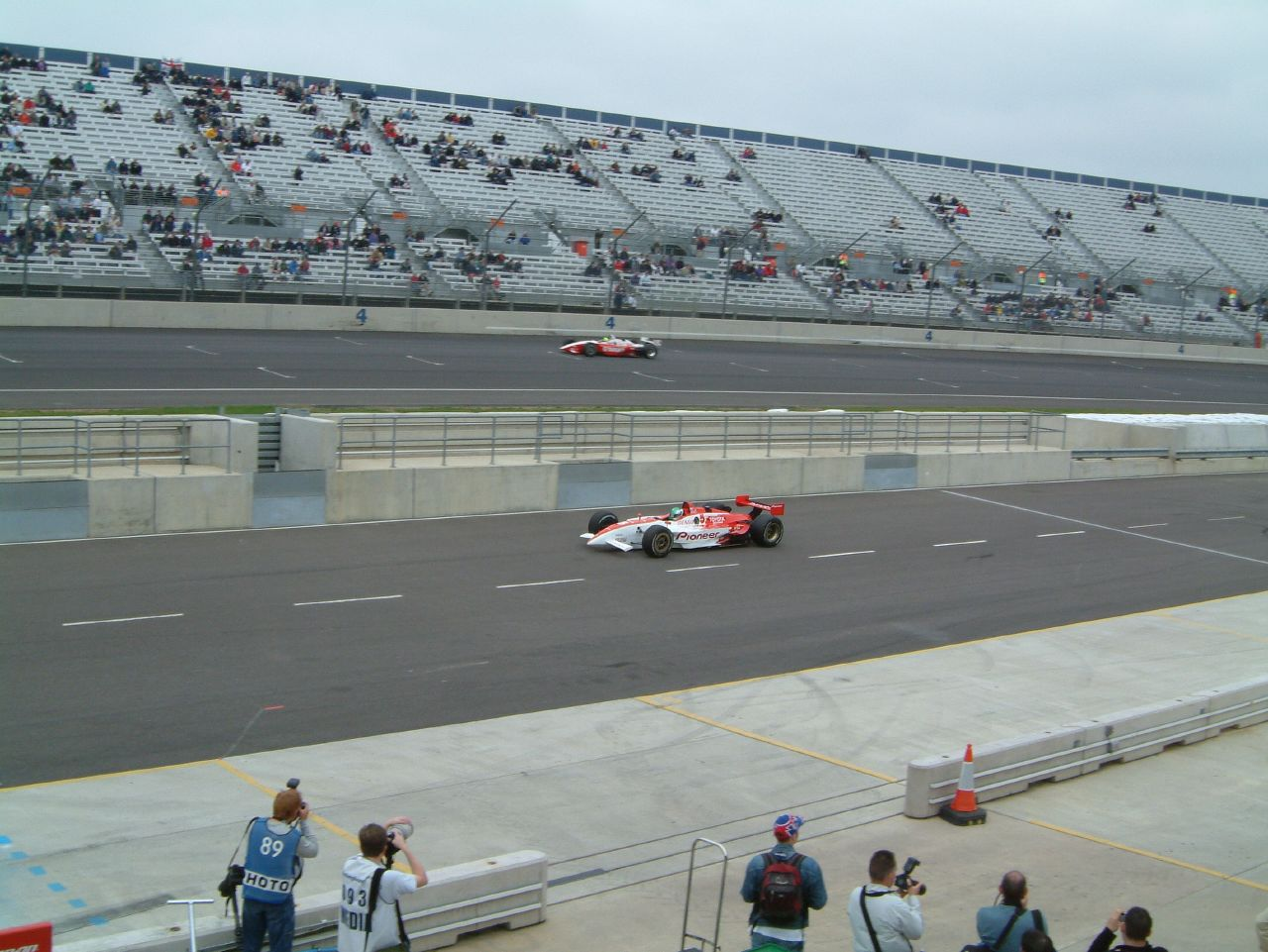
Takagi competing at Rockingham Motor Speedway during the 2002 CART season.

In 2000, Takagi joined Nakajima Racing's Formula Nippon team, earning eight victories in ten races, the most dominant performance ever by a driver in the series. He later competed in CART for the Walker Racing team in 2001 and 2002 finishing in a career-best fourth place in Houston, Texas. He transferred to Indy Racing League and joined Mo Nunn Racing, finishing tenth in 2003. In the same year, he competed in the Indianapolis 500, starting in seventh place and finishing in fifth, earning him the Indianapolis 500 Rookie of the Year award.

After another, largely disappointing season in the IndyCar Series, Takagi returned to Japan in 2005 to compete in Formula Nippon once again, taking part ownership of the Cerumo team and running one of their cars in his own name (Takagi Planning with CERUMO). Takagi also was one of the co-drivers of the No. 38 Toyota Supra Super GT car, claiming the series title along with Yuji Tachikawa. Takagi's title made him the first Super GT rookie to become champion in the GT500 class since John Nielsen and David Brabham in 1996, as well as the last until Jenson Button in 2018.

== Racing record ==
=== Career summary ===
Year	Series	Team	Pos.
1987	Japanese A2 National Kart Series		8th
1988	Japanese A2 National Kart Series		4th
1989	Japanese A2 National Kart Series		**1st**
1990	Japanese A2 National Kart Series		**1st**
1991	Japanese FA National Kart Series		**2nd**
1992	Formula Toyota		?
1993	Japanese Formula Three	TOM'S	10th
1994	Japanese Formula Three	TOM'S	6th
1994	Japanese Formula 3000	Nakajima Racing	NC
1995	Japanese Formula 3000	Nakajima Racing	**2nd**
1996	Formula Nippon	PIAA Nakajima Racing	4th
1997	Formula Nippon	PIAA Nakajima Racing	6th
1997	Formula One	Tyrrell Racing	Test Driver
1998	Formula One	PIAA Tyrrell Ford	21st
1999	Formula One	Repsol Arrows F1 Team	20th
2000	Formula Nippon	PIAA Nakajima Racing	**1st**
2001	CART	Walker Racing	21st
2002	CART	Walker Racing	15th
2003	Indy Racing League	Mo Nunn Racing	10th
2004	Indycar Series	Mo Nunn Racing	15th
2005	Formula Nippon	Team Cerumo	15th
2005	Super GT - GT500	Toyota Team Cerumo	**1st**
2006	Formula Nippon	Team LeMans	18th
2006	Super GT - GT500	Toyota Team Cerumo	5th
2007	Formula Nippon	Team LeMans	16th
2007	Super GT - GT500	Toyota Team Cerumo	7th
2008	Super GT - GT500	Toyota Team SARD	21st

=== Complete Formula Nippon results ===
(key) (Races in bold indicate pole position; races in italics indicate fastest lap)

Year	Entrant	1	2	3	4	5	6	7	8	9	10	DC	Points
1994	Nakajima Racing	SUZ	FUJ	MIN	SUZ	SUG	FUJ	SUZ; 7	FUJ; 8	FUJ	SUZ; 9	17th	0
1995	Nakajima Racing	SUZ; 7	FUJ; C	MIN; 5	SUZ; Ret	**SUG**; 1	FUJ; 12	**TOK**; 1	FUJ; 1	SUZ; Ret		**2nd**	**29**
1996	PIAA Nakajima Racing	**SUZ**; Ret	MIN; 3	FUJ; Ret	**TOK**; Ret	**SUZ**; 1	**SUG**; 1	FUJ; Ret	MIN; Ret	SUZ; 6	FUJ; Ret	4th	25
1997	PIAA Nakajima Racing	**SUZ**; Ret	**MIN**; DNS	FUJ; 3	**SUZ**; 1	SUG; Ret	FUJ; Ret	**MIN**; 5	MOT; Ret	FUJ; Ret	SUZ; 5	6th	18
2000	PIAA Nakajima Racing	SUZ; 1	**MOT**; 1	**MIN**; Ret	FUJ; 1	**SUZ**; 1	**SUG**; 1	**MOT**; 1	FUJ; 1	**MIN**; 1	SUZ; 2	**1st**	**86**
2005	Team Cerumo	MOT; 9	SUZ; Ret	SUG; 11	FUJ; 9	SUZ; 10	MIN; 9	FUJ; 8	MOT; Ret	SUZ; 12		15th	0
2006	Team LeMans	FUJ; 22	SUZ; 16	MOT; 11	SUZ; 8	AUT; 16	FUJ; 8	SUG; Ret	MOT; Ret	SUZ; Ret		18th	0
2007	Forum Engineering Team LeMans	FUJ; Ret	SUZ; 12	MOT; 9	OKA; 16	SUZ; 8	FUJ; 9	SUG; 10	MOT; 12	SUZ; 8		16th	3

=== Complete Formula One results ===
(key)

Year	Entrant	Chassis	Engine	1	2	3	4	5	6	7	8	9	10	11	12	13	14	15	16	WDC	Points
1998	PIAA Tyrrell Ford	Tyrrell 026	Ford V10	AUS; Ret	BRA; Ret	ARG; 12	SMR; Ret	ESP; 13	MON; 11	CAN; Ret	FRA; Ret	GBR; 9	AUT; Ret	GER; 13	HUN; 14	BEL; Ret	ITA; 9	LUX; 16	JPN; Ret	21st	0
1999	Repsol Arrows F1 Team	Arrows A20	Arrows V10	AUS; 7	BRA; 8	SMR; Ret	MON; Ret	ESP; 12	CAN; Ret	FRA; DSQ	GBR; 16	AUT; Ret	GER; Ret	HUN; Ret	BEL; Ret	ITA; Ret	EUR; Ret	MAL; Ret	JPN; Ret	20th	0

=== Complete American Open Wheel racing results ===
(key)

==== CART ====
Year	Team	No.	Chassis	Engine	1	2	3	4	5	6	7	8	9	10	11	12	13	14	15	16	17	18	19	20	21	Rank	Points	Ref
2001	Walker Racing	5	Reynard 01i	Toyota RV8F V8t	MTY; 10	LBH; 20	TXS; NH	NZR; 14	MOT; 20	MIL; DSQ	DET; 20	POR; 18	CLE; 14	TOR; 22	MIS; 13	CHI; 11	MDO; 21	ROA; 22	VAN; 7	LSZ; 6	ROC; 26	HOU; 4	LS; 13	SRF; 16	FON; 15	**21st**	**29**	
2002	Walker Racing	5	Reynard 02i	Toyota RV8F V8t	MTY; 14	LBH; 6	MOT; 8	MIL; 14	LS; 16	POR; 18	CHI; 4	TOR; 8	CLE; 7	VAN; 15	MDO; 12	ROA; 15	MTL; 14	DEN; 15	ROC; 6	MIA; 15	SRF; 18	FON; 18	MXC; 6			**15th**	**53**	

==== IndyCar Series ====
Year	Team	No.	Chassis	Engine	1	2	3	4	5	6	7	8	9	10	11	12	13	14	15	16	Rank	Points	Ref
2003	Mo Nunn Racing	12	G-Force GF09	Toyota Indy V8	HMS; 12	PHX; 22	MOT; 8	INDY; 5	TXS; 3	PPIR; 6	RIR; 13	KAN; 18	NSH; 7	MIS; 6			NZR; 14	CHI; 9	FON; 18	TX2; 7	**10th**	**317**	
2003	Mo Nunn Racing	12	Dallara IR-03	Toyota Indy V8											STL; 7	KTY; 18					**10th**	**317**	
2004	Mo Nunn Racing	12	Dallara IR-04	Toyota Indy V8	HMS; 4	PHX; 8	MOT; 10	INDY; 19	TXS; 10	RIR; 19	KAN; 21	NSH; 11	MIL; 20	MIS; 20	KTY; 20	PPIR; 19	NZR; 17	CHI; 13	FON; 14	TX2; 12	15th	263	

==== Indianapolis 500 ====
Year	Chassis	Engine	Start	Finish	Team
2003	G-Force	Toyota	7	5	Mo Nunn Racing
2004	Dallara	Toyota	26	19	Mo Nunn Racing

=== Complete Super GT results ===
(key) (Races in bold indicate pole position)

Year	Team	Car	Class	1	2	3	4	5	6	7	8	9	DC	Points
2005	ZENT Toyota Team Cerumo	Toyota Supra	GT500	OKA; 14	**FUJ**; 1	SEP; 11	SUG; 11	MOT; 12	FUJ; 1	AUT; 7	**SUZ**; 1		1st	67
2006	Toyota Team Cerumo	Lexus SC430	GT500	SUZ; 5	OKA; 5	**FUJ**; Ret	SEP; 12	**SUG**; 1	SUZ; 7	MOT; 3	AUT; 5	FUJ; Ret	5th	71
2007	ZENT Toyota Team Cerumo	Lexus SC430	GT500	SUZ; 1	OKA; 11	FUJ; 6	SEP; 4	SUG; 11	SUZ; 7	MOT; 14	**AUT**; Ret	FUJ; 4	7th	53
2008	Toyota Team SARD	Lexus SC430	GT500	SUZ; 12	OKA; 14	FUJ; 13	SEP; 12	SUG; 6	SUZ; 15	MOT; 13	AUT; 13	FUJ; 5	21st	11

Sporting positions
Preceded by Tom Coronel	Formula Nippon; Champion; 2000	Succeeded by Satoshi Motoyama
Preceded by Satoshi Motoyama; Richard Lyons	Super GT; GT500 Champion; 2005; With: Yuji Tachikawa	Succeeded by Juichi Wakisaka; André Lotterer
Awards and achievements
Preceded by Alex Barron; Tomas Scheckter	Indianapolis 500; Rookie of the Year; 2003	Succeeded by Kosuke Matsuura
