= 1999 Spanish Grand Prix =

Race 5 of 16 in the 1999 Formula One World Championship
| ← Previous race | Next race → |
- Circuit de Catalunya (last modified in 1997)

Race details
- Date: 30 May 1999
- Official name: XLI Gran Premio Marlboro de España
- Location: Circuit de Catalunya, Montmeló, Catalonia, Spain
- Course: Permanent racing facility
- Course length: 4.728 km (2.938 miles)
- Distance: 65 laps, 307.196 km (190.833 miles)
- Weather: Cloudy, hot, dry 22 °C (72 °F)
- Attendance: 81,000

Pole position
| Driver | (Finland) Mika Häkkinen | McLaren-Mercedes |
- Time: 1:22.088

Fastest lap
| Driver | (Germany) Michael Schumacher | Ferrari |
- Time: 1:24.982 on lap 29

Podium
| First | (Finland) Mika Häkkinen | McLaren-Mercedes |
| Second | (United Kingdom) David Coulthard | McLaren-Mercedes |
| Third | (Germany) Michael Schumacher | Ferrari |

The 1999 Spanish Grand Prix was a Formula One motor race held on 30 May 1999 at the Circuit de Catalunya in Montmeló, Spain. It was the fifth race of the 1999 Formula One season. The 65-lap race was won from pole position by Mika Häkkinen, driving a McLaren-Mercedes, with team-mate David Coulthard second and Michael Schumacher third in a Ferrari.

== Report ==
=== Race ===
Mika Häkkinen, starting on pole for the fifth time in 1999, got off the line quickly and began building a gap between him and second place. David Coulthard and Jacques Villeneuve, starting third and sixth respectively, had great starts and were able to take second and third place by the first corner. Eddie Irvine, starting second, had a poor start and fell to fifth place after being passed by Coulthard, Villeneuve, and then in the second corner, his teammate Michael Schumacher. Olivier Panis and Marc Gené failed to start, with Gené retiring and Panis able to continue on in last place.

The McLaren duo of Häkkinen and Coulthard began building up a substantial gap, with the Ferraris being held up by Villeneuve. Eddie Irvine, on lap 23, became the first of the front runners to pit. Mika Häkkinen came in the next lap, and had built up such a lead that he only fell to second place. Villeneuve and Schumacher both stopped simultaneously, but Villeneuve's stop was longer and Schumacher was able to pass Villeneuve in the pits. Irvine was also able to capitalize on Villeneuve's slow stop to pass him.

After pitting, Michael Schumacher was initially caught behind Heinz-Harald Frentzen, but once past, he began the task of chasing down David Coulthard, fourteen seconds ahead. Schumacher closed to within a second of Coulthard on lap 41, but he pitted the next lap without making an attempt to pass. Mika Häkkinen pitted the lap after Schumacher, and Coulthard pitted on lap 45. Coulthard's stop was slightly faster that Schumacher's, and came out just ahead of Schumacher. Schumacher was able to close up behind Coulthard on cold tires, but was unable to pass Coulthard. Once Coulthard's tires warmed up, he was able to pull away from Schumacher.

Jacques Villeneuve pitted on lap 40, suffering from a broken rear wing element. The mechanics pulled the broken element off the wing, but first gear broke when Villeneuve tried to leave his pit box, and he retired.

Michael Schumacher made another late charge on David Coulthard as the two battled through the lap traffic of Damon Hill, Rubens Barrichello, and Toranosuke Takagi. Schumacher ran out of time, however, and finished the race in third place behind Coulthard. Mika Häkkinen won the race by over six seconds, marking the first time that both McLarens finished a race in 1999. Only one on-track overtaking manoeuvre was reported.

== Classification ==
=== Qualifying ===
| Pos | No | Driver | Constructor | Lap | Gap |
|---|---|---|---|---|---|
| 1 | 1 | (Finland) Mika Häkkinen | McLaren-Mercedes | 1:22.088 | |
| 2 | 4 | (United Kingdom) Eddie Irvine | Ferrari | 1:22.219 | +0.131 |
| 3 | 2 | (United Kingdom) David Coulthard | McLaren-Mercedes | 1:22.244 | +0.156 |
| 4 | 3 | (Germany) Michael Schumacher | Ferrari | 1:22.277 | +0.189 |
| 5 | 11 | (France) Jean Alesi | Sauber-Petronas | 1:22.388 | +0.300 |
| 6 | 22 | (Canada) Jacques Villeneuve | BAR-Supertec | 1:22.703 | +0.615 |
| 7 | 16 | (Brazil) Rubens Barrichello | Stewart-Ford | 1:22.920 | +0.832 |
| 8 | 8 | (Germany) Heinz-Harald Frentzen | Jordan-Mugen-Honda | 1:22.938 | +0.850 |
| 9 | 19 | (Italy) Jarno Trulli | Prost-Peugeot | 1:23.194 | +1.106 |
| 10 | 6 | (Germany) Ralf Schumacher | Williams-Supertec | 1:23.303 | +1.215 |
| 11 | 7 | (United Kingdom) Damon Hill | Jordan-Mugen-Honda | 1:23.317 | +1.229 |
| 12 | 12 | (Brazil) Pedro Diniz | Sauber-Petronas | 1:23.331 | +1.243 |
| 13 | 9 | (Italy) Giancarlo Fisichella | Benetton-Playlife | 1:23.333 | +1.245 |
| 14 | 17 | (United Kingdom) Johnny Herbert | Stewart-Ford | 1:23.505 | +1.417 |
| 15 | 18 | (France) Olivier Panis | Prost-Peugeot | 1:23.559 | +1.471 |
| 16 | 23 | (Finland) Mika Salo | BAR-Supertec | 1:23.683 | +1.595 |
| 17 | 5 | (Italy) Alessandro Zanardi | Williams-Supertec | 1:23.703 | +1.615 |
| 18 | 10 | (Austria) Alexander Wurz | Benetton-Playlife | 1:23.824 | +1.736 |
| 19 | 14 | (Spain) Pedro de la Rosa | Arrows | 1:24.619 | +2.531 |
| 20 | 15 | (Japan) Toranosuke Takagi | Arrows | 1:25.280 | +3.192 |
| 21 | 21 | (Spain) Marc Gené | Minardi-Ford | 1:25.672 | +3.584 |
| 22 | 20 | (Italy) Luca Badoer | Minardi-Ford | 1:25.833 | +3.745 |
107% time: 1:27.834

=== Race ===
| Pos | No | Driver | Constructor | Laps | Time/Retired | Grid | Points |
|---|---|---|---|---|---|---|---|
| 1 | 1 | (Finland) Mika Häkkinen | McLaren-Mercedes | 65 | 1:34:13.665 | 1 | 10 |
| 2 | 2 | (United Kingdom) David Coulthard | McLaren-Mercedes | 65 | + 6.238 | 3 | 6 |
| 3 | 3 | (Germany) Michael Schumacher | Ferrari | 65 | + 10.845 | 4 | 4 |
| 4 | 4 | (United Kingdom) Eddie Irvine | Ferrari | 65 | + 30.182 | 2 | 3 |
| 5 | 6 | (Germany) Ralf Schumacher | Williams-Supertec | 65 | + 1:27.208 | 10 | 2 |
| 6 | 19 | (Italy) Jarno Trulli | Prost-Peugeot | 64 | + 1 Lap | 9 | 1 |
| 7 | 7 | (United Kingdom) Damon Hill | Jordan-Mugen-Honda | 64 | + 1 Lap | 11 | |
| 8 | 23 | (Finland) Mika Salo | BAR-Supertec | 64 | + 1 Lap | 16 | |
| 9 | 9 | (Italy) Giancarlo Fisichella | Benetton-Playlife | 64 | + 1 Lap | 13 | |
| 10 | 10 | (Austria) Alexander Wurz | Benetton-Playlife | 64 | + 1 Lap | 18 | |
| 11 | 14 | (Spain) Pedro de la Rosa | Arrows | 63 | + 2 Laps | 19 | |
| 12 | 15 | (Japan) Toranosuke Takagi | Arrows | 62 | + 3 Laps | 20 | |
| Ret | 20 | (Italy) Luca Badoer | Minardi-Ford | 50 | Spun Off | 22 | |
| Ret | 22 | (Canada) Jacques Villeneuve | BAR-Supertec | 40 | Gearbox | 6 | |
| Ret | 12 | (Brazil) Pedro Diniz | Sauber-Petronas | 40 | Transmission | 12 | |
| Ret | 17 | (United Kingdom) Johnny Herbert | Stewart-Ford | 40 | Transmission | 14 | |
| Ret | 8 | (Germany) Heinz-Harald Frentzen | Jordan-Mugen-Honda | 35 | Halfshaft | 8 | |
| Ret | 11 | (France) Jean Alesi | Sauber-Petronas | 27 | Transmission | 5 | |
| Ret | 5 | (Italy) Alessandro Zanardi | Williams-Supertec | 24 | Gearbox | 17 | |
| Ret | 18 | (France) Olivier Panis | Prost-Peugeot | 24 | Gearbox | 15 | |
| Ret | 21 | (Spain) Marc Gené | Minardi-Ford | 0 | Gearbox | 21 | |
| DSQ | 16 | (Brazil) Rubens Barrichello | Stewart-Ford | 64 | Illegal Undertray Mounting | 7 | |

== Championship standings after the race ==
Drivers' Championship standings

| Pos | Driver | Points |
|---|---|---|
| 1 | (Germany) Michael Schumacher | 30 |
| 2 | (Finland) Mika Häkkinen | 24 |
| 3 | (United Kingdom) Eddie Irvine | 21 |
| 4 | (Germany) Heinz-Harald Frentzen | 13 |
| 5 | (United Kingdom) David Coulthard | 12 |

Constructors' Championship standings

| Pos | Constructor | Points |
|---|---|---|
| 1 | (Italy) Ferrari | 51 |
| 2 | (United Kingdom) McLaren-Mercedes | 36 |
| 3 | (Republic of Ireland) Jordan-Mugen-Honda | 16 |
| 4 | (United Kingdom) Williams-Supertec | 9 |
| 5 | (Italy) Benetton-Playlife | 8 |

- Note: Only the top five positions are included for both sets of standings.

| Previous race: 1999 Monaco Grand Prix | FIA Formula One World Championship; 1999 season | Next race: 1999 Canadian Grand Prix |
| Previous race: 1998 Spanish Grand Prix | Spanish Grand Prix | Next race: 2000 Spanish Grand Prix |
