= 1999 German Grand Prix =

Race 10 of 16 in the 1999 Formula One World Championship
← Previous race	Next race →
- Hockenheimring (last modified in 1994)

Race details
- Date: 1 August 1999
- Official name: Grosser Mobil 1 Preis von Deutschland 1999
- Location: Hockenheimring; Hockenheim, Germany
- Course: Permanent racing facility
- Course length: 6.823 km (4.240 miles)
- Distance: 45 laps, 307.035 km (190.792 miles)
- Weather: Partially cloudy, very hot, dry

Pole position
Driver	(Finland) Mika Häkkinen	McLaren-Mercedes
- Time: 1:42.950

Fastest lap
Driver	(United Kingdom) David Coulthard	McLaren-Mercedes
- Time: 1:45.270 on lap 43

Podium
First	(United Kingdom) Eddie Irvine	Ferrari
Second	(Finland) Mika Salo	Ferrari
Third	(Germany) Heinz-Harald Frentzen	Jordan-Mugen-Honda

The 1999 German Grand Prix (formally the Grosser Mobil 1 Preis von Deutschland 1999) was a Formula One motor race held on 1 August 1999 at the Hockenheimring near Hockenheim, Germany. It was the tenth race of the 1999 FIA Formula One World Championship. With Michael Schumacher out injured, Eddie Irvine took a second successive victory as he chased the championship, aided by stand-in team-mate Mika Salo moving over to give him the lead. In the early laps Finnish drivers ran first and second. However, Mika Häkkinen ultimately crashed out on lap 25 due to a tyre failure, allowing Heinz-Harald Frentzen to finish third in his home Grand Prix.

Damon Hill was again rumoured to be leaving Formula One when he allegedly retired a healthy car. Hill claimed that his Jordan had brake problems. Eddie Irvine gave his winner's trophy to Mika Salo, who was leading towards the end of the race and moved over on team orders.

== Classification ==
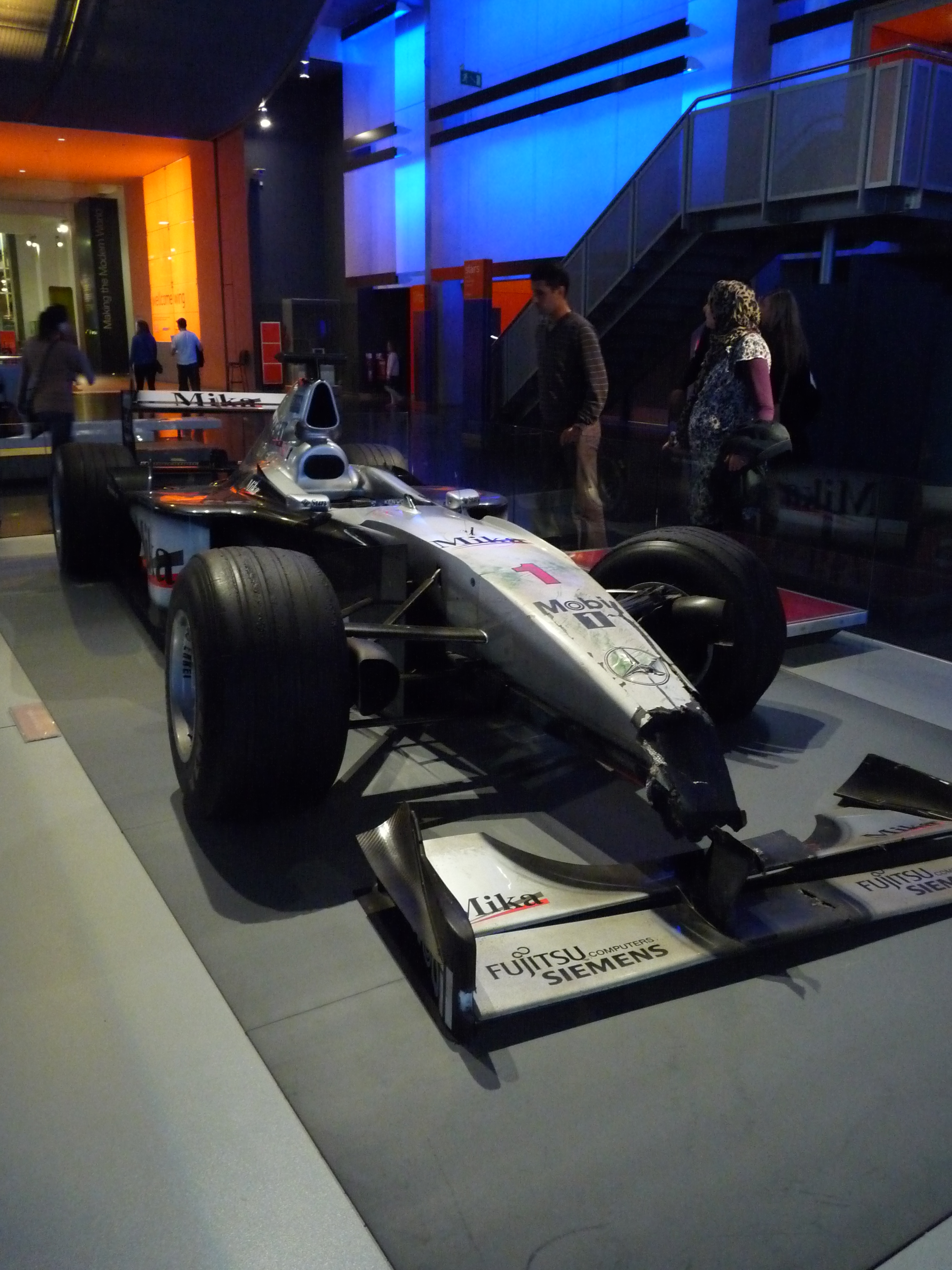
Mika Häkkinen's stricken MP4/14 on display at the London Science Museum.

=== Qualifying ===
Pos	No	Driver	Constructor	Lap	Gap
1	1	(Finland) Mika Häkkinen	McLaren-Mercedes	1:42.950	
2	8	(Germany) Heinz-Harald Frentzen	Jordan-Mugen-Honda	1:43.000	+0.050
3	2	(United Kingdom) David Coulthard	McLaren-Mercedes	1:43.288	+0.338
4	3	(Finland) Mika Salo	Ferrari	1:43.577	+0.627
5	4	(United Kingdom) Eddie Irvine	Ferrari	1:43.769	+0.819
6	16	(Brazil) Rubens Barrichello	Stewart-Ford	1:43.938	+0.988
7	18	(France) Olivier Panis	Prost-Peugeot	1:43.979	+1.029
8	7	(United Kingdom) Damon Hill	Jordan-Mugen-Honda	1:44.001	+1.051
9	19	(Italy) Jarno Trulli	Prost-Peugeot	1:44.209	+1.259
10	9	(Italy) Giancarlo Fisichella	Benetton-Playlife	1:44.338	+1.388
11	6	(Germany) Ralf Schumacher	Williams-Supertec	1:44.468	+1.518
12	22	(Canada) Jacques Villeneuve	BAR-Supertec	1:44.508	+1.558
13	10	(Austria) Alexander Wurz	Benetton-Playlife	1:44.522	+1.572
14	5	(Italy) Alessandro Zanardi	Williams-Supertec	1:45.034	+2.084
15	21	(Spain) Marc Gené	Minardi-Ford	1:45.331	+2.381
16	12	(Brazil) Pedro Diniz	Sauber-Petronas	1:45.335	+2.385
17	17	(United Kingdom) Johnny Herbert	Stewart-Ford	1:45.454	+2.504
18	23	(Brazil) Ricardo Zonta	BAR-Supertec	1:45.460	+2.510
19	20	(Italy) Luca Badoer	Minardi-Ford	1:45.917	+2.967
20	14	(Spain) Pedro de la Rosa	Arrows	1:45.935	+2.985
21	11	(France) Jean Alesi	Sauber-Petronas	1:45.962	+3.012
22	15	(Japan) Toranosuke Takagi	Arrows	1:46.209	+3.259
107% time: 1:50.157

=== Race ===
At the start, Jacques Villeneuve was touched from behind, dove inside, and touched Pedro Diniz, knocking both out at the first corner. At the front, Frentzen had a bad start and was overtaken by Mika Salo and David Coulthard, while Rubens Barrichello passed Eddie Irvine. In midfield, Olivier Panis tangled with Ralf Schumacher at Senna corner and damaged his car; at the rear, Jean Alesi had to pit at the end of the first lap. So, the order was Mika Hakkinen, Mika Salo, Coulthard, Frentzen, Barrichello, and Irvine.

Barrichello passed Frentzen at Agip corner on lap 2 and started to pressure Coulthard, only to see his engine blow up on lap 6. Coulthard closed in on Mika Salo and dove for a maneuver at Ost Kurve on lap 9, but lost a winglet and had to pit. On lap 11 the order was Hakkinen, Salo, Frentzen, Irvine, Ralf Schumacher, and Alexander Wurz.

The Scotsman, who was on a mission to climb the field after his unscheduled pit stop, overtook Olivier Panis off the track only to be penalized with a Stop & Go. The leaders started their mandatory pits, and the first one to stop was Frentzen, only to be overcut by Irvine one lap later. Mika Salo pitted for good and came back just in front of his teammate, putting both Ferraris in podium positions.

If McLaren's journey wasn't a dream given Coulthard's faults, it became a complete nightmare when Hakkinen pitted for the lead and his fuel pump didn't work. The team had to change it for David's one, costing the Finn 24.3 seconds stopped and his fall to fourth place. On lap 26, Hakkinen passed Frentzen at the first chicane and started to pursue the Ferrari duo. However, on the straight before the Stadium section, his rear left tire exploded, his rear wing broke, and he spun off into the tire barrier, retiring from the race and potentially losing his lead in the championship. On the same lap, Salo and Irvine swapped positions, putting the Ulsterman in first. On lap 27 the order was Irvine, Salo, Frentzen, Ralf Schumacher, Panis, and Coulthard.

After those incidents, the other two casualties were Pedro de la Rosa's accident and Johnny Herbert retiring after a good journey, but suffering from reliability problems once again. In the closing stages, Coulthard passed Panis for fifth place and the order remained the same until the chequered flag.

Pos	No	Driver	Constructor	Laps	Time/Retired	Grid	Points
1	4	(United Kingdom) Eddie Irvine	Ferrari	45	1:21:58.594	5	10
2	3	(Finland) Mika Salo	Ferrari	45	+ 1.007	4	6
3	8	(Germany) Heinz-Harald Frentzen	Jordan-Mugen-Honda	45	+ 5.195	2	4
4	6	(Germany) Ralf Schumacher	Williams-Supertec	45	+ 12.809	11	3
5	2	(United Kingdom) David Coulthard	McLaren-Mercedes	45	+ 16.823	3	2
6	18	(France) Olivier Panis	Prost-Peugeot	45	+ 29.879	7	1
7	10	(Austria) Alexander Wurz	Benetton-Playlife	45	+ 33.333	13	
8	11	(France) Jean Alesi	Sauber-Petronas	45	+ 1:11.291	21	
9	21	(Spain) Marc Gené	Minardi-Ford	45	+ 1:48.318	15	
10	20	(Italy) Luca Badoer	Minardi-Ford	44	+ 1 Lap	19	
11	17	(United Kingdom) Johnny Herbert	Stewart-Ford	40	Gearbox	17	
Ret	14	(Spain) Pedro de la Rosa	Arrows	37	Accident	20	
Ret	1	(Finland) Mika Häkkinen	McLaren-Mercedes	25	Tyre/Accident	1	
Ret	5	(Italy) Alessandro Zanardi	Williams-Supertec	21	Differential	14	
Ret	23	(Brazil) Ricardo Zonta	BAR-Supertec	20	Engine	18	
Ret	15	(Japan) Toranosuke Takagi	Arrows	15	Engine	22	
Ret	7	(United Kingdom) Damon Hill	Jordan-Mugen-Honda	13	Brakes	8	
Ret	19	(Italy) Jarno Trulli	Prost-Peugeot	10	Engine	9	
Ret	9	(Italy) Giancarlo Fisichella	Benetton-Playlife	7	Suspension	10	
Ret	16	(Brazil) Rubens Barrichello	Stewart-Ford	6	Hydraulics	6	
Ret	22	(Canada) Jacques Villeneuve	BAR-Supertec	0	Collision	12	
Ret	12	(Brazil) Pedro Diniz	Sauber-Petronas	0	Collision	16	

== Championship standings after the race ==
Drivers' Championship standings

Pos	Driver	Points
1	(United Kingdom) Eddie Irvine	52
2	(Finland) Mika Häkkinen	44
3	(Germany) Heinz-Harald Frentzen	33
4	(Germany) Michael Schumacher	32
5	(United Kingdom) David Coulthard	30

Constructors' Championship standings

Pos	Constructor	Points
1	(Italy) Ferrari	90
2	(United Kingdom) McLaren-Mercedes	74
3	(Republic of Ireland) Jordan-Mugen-Honda	38
4	(United Kingdom) Williams-Supertec	22
5	(Italy) Benetton-Playlife	16

- Note: Only the top five positions are included for both sets of standings.

Previous race: 1999 Austrian Grand Prix	FIA Formula One World Championship; 1999 season	Next race: 1999 Hungarian Grand Prix
Previous race: 1998 German Grand Prix	German Grand Prix	Next race: 2000 German Grand Prix
