= 1999 Malaysian Grand Prix =

Formula One motor race

Race 15 of 16 in the 1999 Formula One World Championship
← Previous race	Next race →

Race details
- Date: 17 October 1999
- Official name: 1999 Petronas Malaysian Grand Prix
- Location: Sepang International Circuit; Sepang, Malaysia
- Course: Permanent racing facility
- Course length: 5.542 km (3.444 miles)
- Distance: 56 laps, 310.352 km (192.853 miles)
- Weather: Cloudy, hot, dry
- Attendance: 80,000 (Weekend)

Pole position
Driver	(Germany) Michael Schumacher	Ferrari
- Time: 1:39.688

Fastest lap
Driver	(Germany) Michael Schumacher	Ferrari
- Time: 1:40.267 on lap 25

Podium
First	(United Kingdom) Eddie Irvine	Ferrari
Second	(Germany) Michael Schumacher	Ferrari
Third	(Finland) Mika Häkkinen	McLaren-Mercedes

The 1999 Malaysian Grand Prix, formally the 1999 Petronas Malaysian Grand Prix, was a Formula One race held on 17 October 1999 at the new Sepang International Circuit. It was the fifteenth race of the 1999 Formula One World Championship.

The 56-lap race was won by Eddie Irvine, driving a Ferrari, after starting from second position. Teammate Michael Schumacher, in his first race back after breaking his leg at the 1999 British Grand Prix, finished second after letting Irvine overtake him, having started from pole position. Championship leader Mika Häkkinen finished third in a McLaren-Mercedes.

Both Ferraris were disqualified for the race, and Häkkinen and McLaren initially appeared to have won both championships. After Ferrari's successful appeal, the race results were reinstated. Although the win gave Irvine a four point lead over Häkkinen in the Drivers' Championship with one race to go, it would be his fourth and last Formula One career win.

== Report ==
This was the first Malaysian Grand Prix since a Formula Holden event in 1995, and the first time at Formula One world championship level. Michael Schumacher returned to Formula One having recovered from his broken leg, and took pole position by nearly a second from Ferrari teammate Eddie Irvine, with the McLarens of David Coulthard and Mika Häkkinen third and fourth, respectively. At the start, Schumacher led away from Irvine, Coulthard, Häkkinen, and Rubens Barrichello. On lap 4, Schumacher slowed and allowed Irvine to pass him, then proceeded to block the McLarens. Coulthard forced his way past Schumacher on lap 5 and pursued Irvine for the lead, only to retire on lap 15 with fuel pressure problems.

Back in second place, Schumacher slowed again in order to allow Irvine to build an advantage. As the first round of pit stops loomed, Schumacher accelerated the pace in order to stay ahead of Häkkinen. Realising this, McLaren gambled on giving Häkkinen half a tank of fuel, hoping it would be enough to get him out of the pits ahead of Schumacher. The gamble failed, as Schumacher stayed ahead of the Finn and proceeded to block him again, allowing Irvine to extend his lead to 20 seconds.

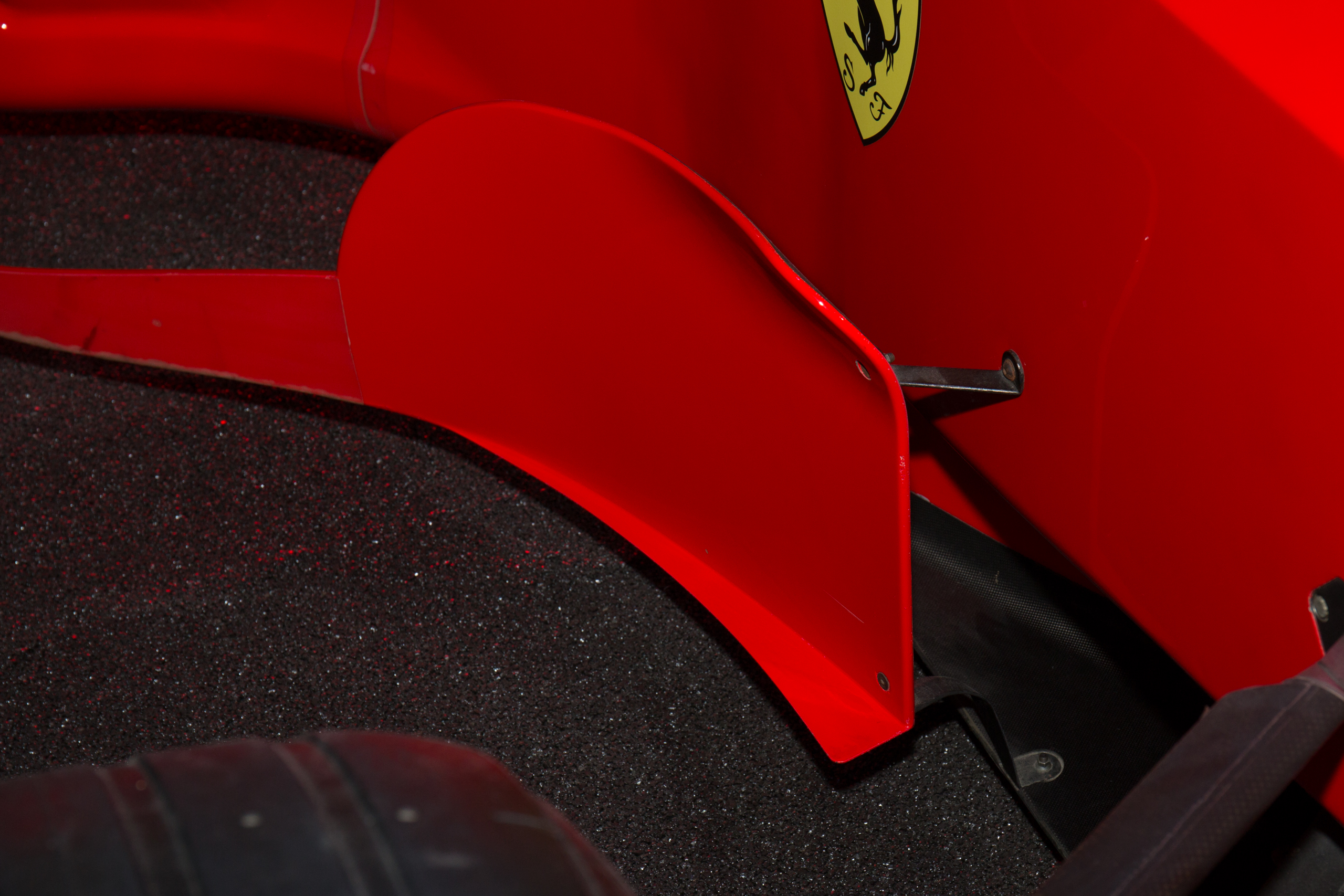
Ferrari F399's bargeboard that caused controversy following the race

Irvine's lead was not big enough for him to stay ahead after his second pit stop. Despite this, Ferrari were sure that Häkkinen would have to stop again, which he did, emerging in fourth place behind Johnny Herbert in the Stewart. Schumacher slowed once again to allow Irvine to retake the lead, while Häkkinen forced his way past Herbert for third.

Irvine duly took the chequered flag one second ahead of Schumacher, with Häkkinen a further eight seconds back. Immediately after the race, the Ferraris were disqualified due to an infringement on their bargeboards. This meant that Häkkinen and McLaren were effectively handed their respective championships by default. Ferrari appealed against the FIA's decision in court and both drivers were subsequently reinstated.

With one race remaining, Irvine led the Drivers' Championship by four points over Häkkinen, 70 to 66. Similarly, Ferrari held a four-point lead over McLaren in the Constructors' Championship, 118 to 114. Despite Schumacher's alleged wish not to have Irvine being the Ferrari driver to end the team championship's drought, his performance in Malaysia proved instrumental for Irvine to possibly win the championship at the 1999 Japanese Grand Prix.

== Classification ==
=== Qualifying ===
Pos	No	Driver	Constructor	Lap	Gap
1	3	(Germany) Michael Schumacher	Ferrari	1:39.688	
2	4	(United Kingdom) Eddie Irvine	Ferrari	1:40.635	+0.947
3	2	(United Kingdom) David Coulthard	McLaren-Mercedes	1:40.806	+1.118
4	1	(Finland) Mika Häkkinen	McLaren-Mercedes	1:40.866	+1.178
5	17	(United Kingdom) Johnny Herbert	Stewart-Ford	1:40.937	+1.249
6	16	(Brazil) Rubens Barrichello	Stewart-Ford	1:41.351	+1.663
7	10	(Austria) Alexander Wurz	Benetton-Playlife	1:41.444	+1.756
8	6	(Germany) Ralf Schumacher	Williams-Supertec	1:41.558	+1.870
9	7	(United Kingdom) Damon Hill	Jordan-Mugen-Honda	1:42.050	+2.362
10	22	(Canada) Jacques Villeneuve	BAR-Supertec	1:42.087	+2.399
11	9	(Italy) Giancarlo Fisichella	Benetton-Playlife	1:42.110	+2.422
12	18	(France) Olivier Panis	Prost-Peugeot	1:42.208	+2.520
13	23	(Brazil) Ricardo Zonta	BAR-Supertec	1:42.310	+2.622
14	8	(Germany) Heinz-Harald Frentzen	Jordan-Mugen-Honda	1:42.380	+2.692
15	11	(France) Jean Alesi	Sauber-Petronas	1:42.522	+2.834
16	5	(Italy) Alessandro Zanardi	Williams-Supertec	1:42.885	+3.197
17	12	(Brazil) Pedro Diniz	Sauber-Petronas	1:42.933	+3.245
18	19	(Italy) Jarno Trulli	Prost-Peugeot	1:42.948	+3.260
19	21	(Spain) Marc Gené	Minardi-Ford	1:43.563	+3.875
20	14	(Spain) Pedro de la Rosa	Arrows	1:43.579	+3.891
21	20	(Italy) Luca Badoer	Minardi-Ford	1:44.321	+4.633
22	15	(Japan) Toranosuke Takagi	Arrows	1:44.637	+4.949
107% time: 1:46.666

=== Race ===
Pos	No	Driver	Constructor	Laps	Time/Retired	Grid	Points
1	4	(United Kingdom) Eddie Irvine	Ferrari	56	1:36:38.494	2	10
2	3	(Germany) Michael Schumacher	Ferrari	56	+ 1.040	1	6
3	1	(Finland) Mika Häkkinen	McLaren-Mercedes	56	+ 9.743	4	4
4	17	(United Kingdom) Johnny Herbert	Stewart-Ford	56	+ 17.538	5	3
5	16	(Brazil) Rubens Barrichello	Stewart-Ford	56	+ 32.296	6	2
6	8	(Germany) Heinz-Harald Frentzen	Jordan-Mugen-Honda	56	+ 34.884	14	1
7	11	(France) Jean Alesi	Sauber-Petronas	56	+ 54.408	15	
8	10	(Austria) Alexander Wurz	Benetton-Playlife	56	+ 1:00.934	7	
9	21	(Spain) Marc Gené	Minardi-Ford	55	+ 1 lap	19	
10	5	(Italy) Alessandro Zanardi	Williams-Supertec	55	+ 1 lap	16	
11	9	(Italy) Giancarlo Fisichella	Benetton-Playlife	52	+ 4 laps	11	
Ret	22	(Canada) Jacques Villeneuve	BAR-Supertec	48	Hydraulics	10	
Ret	12	(Brazil) Pedro Diniz	Sauber-Petronas	44	Spun off	17	
Ret	14	(Spain) Pedro de la Rosa	Arrows	30	Engine	20	
Ret	20	(Italy) Luca Badoer	Minardi-Ford	15	Spun off	21	
Ret	2	(United Kingdom) David Coulthard	McLaren-Mercedes	14	Fuel pressure	3	
Ret	6	(Germany) Ralf Schumacher	Williams-Supertec	7	Spun off	8	
Ret	15	(Japan) Toranosuke Takagi	Arrows	7	Transmission	22	
Ret	23	(Brazil) Ricardo Zonta	BAR-Supertec	6	Engine/Spun off	13	
Ret	18	(France) Olivier Panis	Prost-Peugeot	5	Engine	12	
Ret	7	(United Kingdom) Damon Hill	Jordan-Mugen-Honda	0	Collision	9	
DNS	19	(Italy) Jarno Trulli	Prost-Peugeot	0	Engine	18	

== Championship standings after the race ==
- **Bold text** indicates who still had a theoretical chance of becoming World Champion.

Drivers' Championship standings

Pos	Driver	Points
1	(United Kingdom) **Eddie Irvine**	70
2	(Finland) **Mika Häkkinen**	66
3	(Germany) Heinz-Harald Frentzen	51
4	(United Kingdom) David Coulthard	48
5	(Germany) Michael Schumacher	38

Constructors' Championship standings

Pos	Constructor	Points
1	(Italy) **Ferrari**	118
2	(United Kingdom) **McLaren-Mercedes**	114
3	(Republic of Ireland) Jordan-Mugen-Honda	58
4	(United Kingdom) Stewart-Ford	36
5	(United Kingdom) Williams-Supertec	33

- Note: Only the top five positions are included for both sets of standings.

Previous race: 1999 European Grand Prix	FIA Formula One World Championship; 1999 season	Next race: 1999 Japanese Grand Prix
Previous race: 1982 Malaysian Grand Prix	Malaysian Grand Prix	Next race: 2000 Malaysian Grand Prix
Awards
Preceded by 1998 San Marino Grand Prix	Formula One Promotional Trophy for Race Promoter; 1999	Succeeded by 2000 United States Grand Prix
