= 1999 Austrian Grand Prix =

Race 9 of 16 in the 1999 Formula One World Championship
← Previous race	Next race →
- A1-Ring (last modified in 1998)

Race details
- Date: 25 July 1999
- Official name: XXVIII Großer Preis von Österreich
- Location: Spielberg, Austria
- Course: Permanent racing facility
- Course length: 4.319 km (2.684 miles)
- Distance: 71 laps, 306.649 km (190.552 miles)
- Weather: Overcast, mild, dry

Pole position
Driver	(Finland) Mika Häkkinen	McLaren-Mercedes
- Time: 1:10.954

Fastest lap
Driver	(Finland) Mika Häkkinen	McLaren-Mercedes
- Time: 1:12.107 on lap 39

Podium
First	(United Kingdom) Eddie Irvine	Ferrari
Second	(United Kingdom) David Coulthard	McLaren-Mercedes
Third	(Finland) Mika Häkkinen	McLaren-Mercedes

The 1999 Austrian Grand Prix was a Formula One motor race held on 25 July 1999 at the A1-Ring in Spielberg, Austria. It was the ninth race of the 1999 Formula One season.

After Michael Schumacher broke his leg in the previous race at Silverstone, Ferrari's title attention turned to his teammate Eddie Irvine. David Coulthard nudged teammate Mika Häkkinen off the track on the first lap, pushing Häkkinen to the back. When Coulthard failed to hold off Irvine during the sole round of pitstops, the man from Northern Ireland wrapped up his 2nd Formula One win. Häkkinen fought through the field to finish 3rd. Mika Salo substituted for Schumacher, while Pedro Diniz scored his last world championship points at this race.

== Classification ==
=== Qualifying ===
Pos	No	Driver	Constructor	Time	Gap
1	1	(Finland) Mika Häkkinen	McLaren-Mercedes	1:10.954	
2	2	(United Kingdom) David Coulthard	McLaren-Mercedes	1:11.153	+0.199
3	4	(United Kingdom) Eddie Irvine	Ferrari	1:11.973	+1.019
4	8	(Germany) Heinz-Harald Frentzen	Jordan-Mugen-Honda	1:12.266	+1.312
5	16	(Brazil) Rubens Barrichello	Stewart-Ford	1:12.342	+1.388
6	17	(United Kingdom) Johnny Herbert	Stewart-Ford	1:12.488	+1.534
7	3	(Finland) Mika Salo	Ferrari	1:12.514	+1.560
8	6	(Germany) Ralf Schumacher	Williams-Supertec	1:12.515	+1.561
9	22	(Canada) Jacques Villeneuve	BAR-Supertec	1:12.833	+1.879
10	10	(Austria) Alexander Wurz	Benetton-Playlife	1:12.850	+1.896
11	7	(United Kingdom) Damon Hill	Jordan-Mugen-Honda	1:12.901	+1.947
12	9	(Italy) Giancarlo Fisichella	Benetton-Playlife	1:12.924	+1.970
13	19	(Italy) Jarno Trulli	Prost-Peugeot	1:12.999	+2.045
14	5	(Italy) Alessandro Zanardi	Williams-Supertec	1:13.101	+2.147
15	23	(Brazil) Ricardo Zonta	BAR-Supertec	1:13.172	+2.218
16	12	(Brazil) Pedro Diniz	Sauber-Petronas	1:13.223	+2.269
17	11	(France) Jean Alesi	Sauber-Petronas	1:13.226	+2.272
18	18	(France) Olivier Panis	Prost-Peugeot	1:13.457	+2.503
19	20	(Italy) Luca Badoer	Minardi-Ford	1:13.606	+2.652
20	15	(Japan) Toranosuke Takagi	Arrows	1:13.641	+2.687
21	14	(Spain) Pedro de la Rosa	Arrows	1:14.139	+3.185
22	21	(Spain) Marc Gené	Minardi-Ford	1:14.363	+3.409
107% time: 1:15.921

=== Race ===
Pos	No	Driver	Constructor	Laps	Time/Retired	Grid	Points
1	4	(United Kingdom) Eddie Irvine	Ferrari	71	1:28:12.438	3	10
2	2	(United Kingdom) David Coulthard	McLaren-Mercedes	71	+0.313	2	6
3	1	(Finland) Mika Häkkinen	McLaren-Mercedes	71	+22.282	1	4
4	8	(Germany) Heinz-Harald Frentzen	Jordan-Mugen-Honda	71	+52.803	4	3
5	10	(Austria) Alexander Wurz	Benetton-Playlife	71	+1:06.358	10	2
6	12	(Brazil) Pedro Diniz	Sauber-Petronas	71	+1:10.933	16	1
7	19	(Italy) Jarno Trulli	Prost-Peugeot	70	+1 Lap	13	
8	7	(United Kingdom) Damon Hill	Jordan-Mugen-Honda	70	+1 Lap	11	
9	3	(Finland) Mika Salo	Ferrari	70	+1 Lap	7	
10	18	(France) Olivier Panis	Prost-Peugeot	70	+1 Lap	18	
11	21	(Spain) Marc Gené	Minardi-Ford	70	+1 Lap	22	
12	9	(Italy) Giancarlo Fisichella	Benetton-Playlife	68	Engine	12	
13	20	(Italy) Luca Badoer	Minardi-Ford	68	+3 Laps	19	
14	17	(United Kingdom) Johnny Herbert	Stewart-Ford	67	+4 Laps	6	
15	23	(Brazil) Ricardo Zonta	BAR-Supertec	63	Clutch	15	
Ret	16	(Brazil) Rubens Barrichello	Stewart-Ford	55	Engine	5	
Ret	11	(France) Jean Alesi	Sauber-Petronas	49	Out of fuel	17	
Ret	14	(Spain) Pedro de la Rosa	Arrows	38	Spun off	21	
Ret	5	(Italy) Alessandro Zanardi	Williams-Supertec	35	Out of fuel	14	
Ret	22	(Canada) Jacques Villeneuve	BAR-Supertec	34	Halfshaft	9	
Ret	15	(Japan) Toranosuke Takagi	Arrows	25	Engine	20	
Ret	6	(Germany) Ralf Schumacher	Williams-Supertec	8	Spun off	8	

== Championship standings after the race ==
Drivers' Championship standings

Pos	Driver	Points
1	(Finland) Mika Häkkinen	44
2	(United Kingdom) Eddie Irvine	42
3	(Germany) Michael Schumacher	32
4	(Germany) Heinz-Harald Frentzen	29
5	(United Kingdom) David Coulthard	28

Constructors' Championship standings

Pos	Constructor	Points
1	(Italy) Ferrari	74
2	(United Kingdom) McLaren-Mercedes	72
3	(Republic of Ireland) Jordan-Mugen-Honda	34
4	(United Kingdom) Williams-Supertec	19
5	(Italy) Benetton-Playlife	16

- Note: Only the top five positions are included for both sets of standings.

Previous race: 1999 British Grand Prix	FIA Formula One World Championship; 1999 season	Next race: 1999 German Grand Prix
Previous race: 1998 Austrian Grand Prix	Austrian Grand Prix	Next race: 2000 Austrian Grand Prix
