= 1999 British Grand Prix =

Race 8 of 16 in the 1999 Formula One World Championship
← Previous race	Next race →
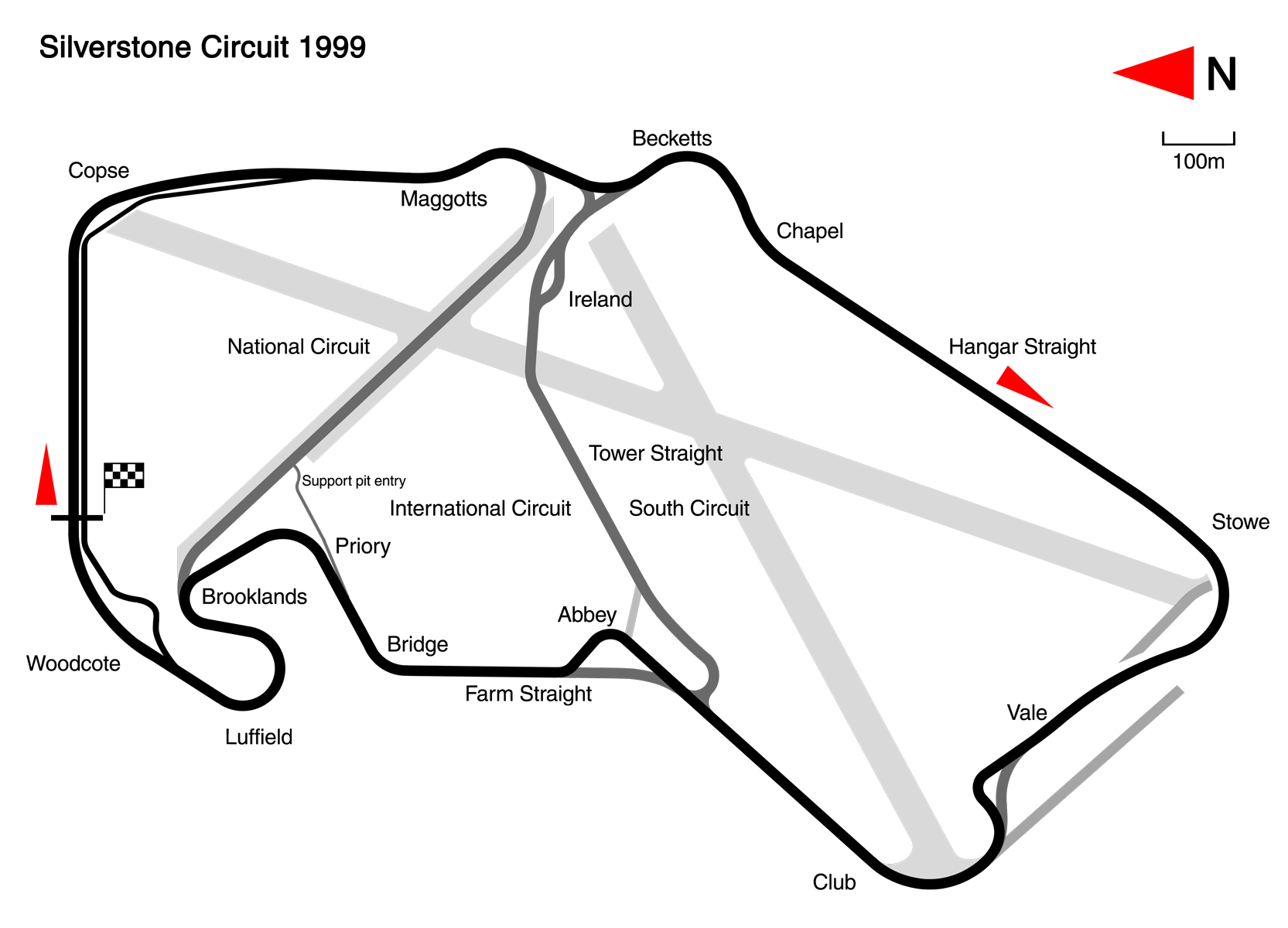
- Silverstone Circuit in its 1999 configuration

Race details
- Date: 11 July 1999
- Official name: 1999 RAC British Grand Prix
- Location: Silverstone, Northamptonshire and Buckinghamshire, England
- Course: Permanent racing facility
- Course length: 5.140 km (3.194 miles)
- Distance: 60 laps, 308.296 km (191.566 miles)
- Weather: Sunny, mild, dry

Pole position
Driver	(Finland) Mika Häkkinen	McLaren-Mercedes
- Time: 1:24.804

Fastest lap
Driver	(Finland) Mika Häkkinen	McLaren-Mercedes
- Time: 1:28.309 on lap 28

Podium
First	(United Kingdom) David Coulthard	McLaren-Mercedes
Second	(United Kingdom) Eddie Irvine	Ferrari
Third	(Germany) Ralf Schumacher	Williams-Supertec

The 1999 British Grand Prix (officially the 1999 RAC British Grand Prix) was a Formula One motor race held on 11 July 1999 at the Silverstone Circuit near Silverstone, England. It was the eighth race of the 1999 Formula One World Championship. The 60-lap race was won by McLaren driver David Coulthard after he started from third position. Eddie Irvine finished second for the Ferrari team and Williams driver Ralf Schumacher came in third. Jacques Villeneuve and Alessandro Zanardi both stalled on the grid. The race was red flagged due to Race Director Charlie Whiting accidentally hitting the red flag button instead of the pit exit open button. While the red flags were out, Michael Schumacher crashed at Stowe corner due to brake failure, breaking his right leg. This would keep him out of Formula One until the Malaysian Grand Prix, ending his championship hopes.

Following a difficult season Damon Hill performed well to finish 5th in his home race and seemed happy enough to carry on for the rest of the season. He had also briefly led the race for a lap, which was the last time he would lead a Grand Prix.

This was Toranosuke Takagi's final classified Formula One race finish. He failed to finish each of his subsequent eight races.

This was McLaren team's first British Grand Prix victory since 1989. The podiums of Coulthard and Irvine (for 1st and 2nd) also marked the last time two drivers racing under a British flag would stand together on the podium at their home event until the 2023 edition where Lando Norris and Lewis Hamilton finished second and third.

== Classification ==
=== Qualifying ===
Pos	No	Driver	Constructor	Time	Gap
1	1	(Finland) Mika Häkkinen	McLaren-Mercedes	1:24.804	
2	3	(Germany) Michael Schumacher	Ferrari	1:25.223	+0.419
3	2	(United Kingdom) David Coulthard	McLaren-Mercedes	1:25.594	+0.790
4	4	(United Kingdom) Eddie Irvine	Ferrari	1:25.677	+0.873
5	8	(Germany) Heinz-Harald Frentzen	Jordan-Mugen-Honda	1:25.991	+1.187
6	7	(United Kingdom) Damon Hill	Jordan-Mugen-Honda	1:26.099	+1.295
7	16	(Brazil) Rubens Barrichello	Stewart-Ford	1:26.194	+1.390
8	6	(Germany) Ralf Schumacher	Williams-Supertec	1:26.438	+1.634
9	22	(Canada) Jacques Villeneuve	BAR-Supertec	1:26.719	+1.915
10	11	(France) Jean Alesi	Sauber-Petronas	1:26.761	+1.957
11	17	(United Kingdom) Johnny Herbert	Stewart-Ford	1:26.873	+2.069
12	12	(Brazil) Pedro Diniz	Sauber-Petronas	1:27.196	+2.392
13	5	(Italy) Alessandro Zanardi	Williams-Supertec	1:27.223	+2.419
14	19	(Italy) Jarno Trulli	Prost-Peugeot	1:27.227	+2.423
15	18	(France) Olivier Panis	Prost-Peugeot	1:27.543	+2.739
16	23	(Brazil) Ricardo Zonta	BAR-Supertec	1:27.699	+2.895
17	9	(Italy) Giancarlo Fisichella	Benetton-Playlife	1:27.857	+3.053
18	10	(Austria) Alexander Wurz	Benetton-Playlife	1:28.010	+3.206
19	15	(Japan) Toranosuke Takagi	Arrows	1:28.037	+3.233
20	14	(Spain) Pedro de la Rosa	Arrows	1:28.148	+3.344
21	20	(Italy) Luca Badoer	Minardi-Ford	1:28.695	+3.891
22	21	(Spain) Marc Gené	Minardi-Ford	1:28.772	+3.968
107% time: 1:30.740

=== Race ===
Pos	No	Driver	Constructor	Laps	Time/Retired	Grid	Points
1	2	(United Kingdom) David Coulthard	McLaren-Mercedes	60	1:32:30.144	3	10
2	4	(United Kingdom) Eddie Irvine	Ferrari	60	+1.829	4	6
3	6	(Germany) Ralf Schumacher	Williams-Supertec	60	+27.411	8	4
4	8	(Germany) Heinz-Harald Frentzen	Jordan-Mugen-Honda	60	+27.789	5	3
5	7	(United Kingdom) Damon Hill	Jordan-Mugen-Honda	60	+38.606	6	2
6	12	(Brazil) Pedro Diniz	Sauber-Petronas	60	+53.643	12	1
7	9	(Italy) Giancarlo Fisichella	Benetton-Playlife	60	+54.614	17	
8	16	(Brazil) Rubens Barrichello	Stewart-Ford	60	+1:08.590	7	
9	19	(Italy) Jarno Trulli	Prost-Peugeot	60	+1:12.045	14	
10	10	(Austria) Alexander Wurz	Benetton-Playlife	60	+1:12.123	18	
11	5	(Italy) Alessandro Zanardi	Williams-Supertec	60	+1:17.124	13	
12	17	(United Kingdom) Johnny Herbert	Stewart-Ford	60	+1:17.709	11	
13	18	(France) Olivier Panis	Prost-Peugeot	60	+1:20.492	15	
14	11	(France) Jean Alesi	Sauber-Petronas	59	+1 lap	10	
15	21	(Spain) Marc Gené	Minardi-Ford	58	+2 laps	22	
16	15	(Japan) Toranosuke Takagi	Arrows	58	+2 laps	19	
Ret	23	(Brazil) Ricardo Zonta	BAR-Supertec	41	Suspension	16	
Ret	1	(Finland) Mika Häkkinen	McLaren-Mercedes	35	Wheel	1	
Ret	22	(Canada) Jacques Villeneuve	BAR-Supertec	29	Halfshaft	9	
Ret	20	(Italy) Luca Badoer	Minardi-Ford	6	Gearbox	21	
Ret	14	(Spain) Pedro de la Rosa	Arrows	0	Gearbox	20	
DNS	3	(Germany) Michael Schumacher	Ferrari	0	Accident/injury	2^{1}	

Notes

- ^1 – Michael Schumacher was not present at the race restart. His place on the grid was left vacant.

== Championship standings after the race ==
Drivers' Championship standings

Pos	Driver	Points
1	(Finland) Mika Häkkinen	40
2	(Germany) Michael Schumacher	32
3	(United Kingdom) Eddie Irvine	32
4	(Germany) Heinz-Harald Frentzen	26
5	(United Kingdom) David Coulthard	22

Constructors' Championship standings

Pos	Constructor	Points
1	(Italy) Ferrari	64
2	(United Kingdom) McLaren-Mercedes	62
3	(Republic of Ireland) Jordan-Mugen-Honda	31
4	(United Kingdom) Williams-Supertec	19
5	(Italy) Benetton-Playlife	14

- Note: Only the top five positions are included for both sets of standings.

Previous race: 1999 French Grand Prix	FIA Formula One World Championship; 1999 season	Next race: 1999 Austrian Grand Prix
Previous race: 1998 British Grand Prix	British Grand Prix	Next race: 2000 British Grand Prix
