= Stewart SF3 =

Formula One racing car

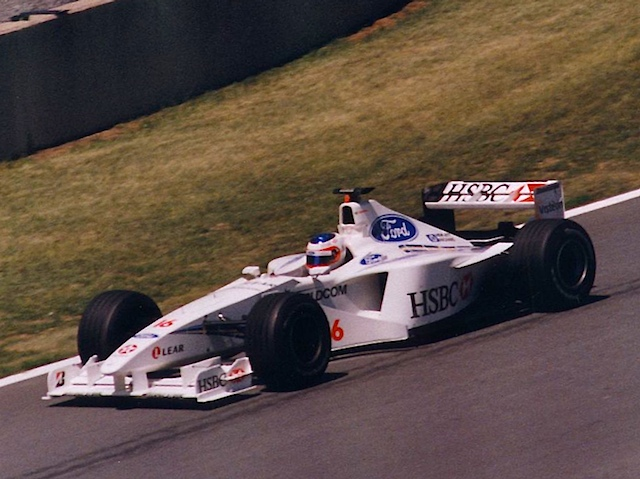
- Rubens Barrichello driving the SF3 at the 1999 Canadian Grand Prix
- Category: Formula One
- Constructor: Stewart Grand Prix
- Designers: Gary Anderson (Technical Director); Dave Amey (Chief Designer); Steve Foster (Head of Design - Composites); Dave Rendall (Head of Design - Mechanical); Eghbal Hamidy (Head of Aerodynamics); Nick Hayes (Engine Chief Designer - Ford Cosworth)
- Predecessor: SF02
- Successor: Jaguar R1

Technical specifications
- Chassis: Moulded carbon fibre monocoque.
- Suspension (front): Double wishbone, with pushrod activated, inboard spring/damper units.
- Suspension (rear): As front.
- Engine: Ford Cosworth CR-1 2,998 cc (183 cu in) 72° V10. naturally-aspirated, mid-engined
- Transmission: Stewart 6-speed sequential semi-automatic Longitudinally mounted
- Power: 790 hp (589 kW) @ 16,200 rpm
- Fuel: Texaco
- Tyres: Bridgestone

Competition history
- Notable entrants: Stewart Ford
- Notable drivers: 16. (Brazil) Rubens Barrichello; 17. (United Kingdom) Johnny Herbert
- Debut: 1999 Australian Grand Prix
- First win: 1999 European Grand Prix
- Last win: 1999 European Grand Prix
- Last event: 1999 Japanese Grand Prix
Races	Wins	Podiums	Poles	F/Laps
16	1	4	1	0
- Constructors' Championships: 0 (4th: 1999)
- Drivers' Championships: 0

The Stewart SF3 was the car with which the Stewart Grand Prix team competed in the 1999 Formula One World Championship. It was driven by Brazilian Rubens Barrichello, in his third season with the team, and Briton Johnny Herbert, who joined from Sauber.

Stewart were purchased by the Ford Motor Company during the 1999 season, and would be renamed Jaguar Racing for the 2000 season onwards. The SF3 was the final Formula One car known as a Stewart.

== Design and development ==
Testing for the SF3 began in 1998, which included tests at Silverstone for Luciano Burti and Mario Haberfeld who drove for Paul Stewart in F3. Later in October 1998, Jos Verstappen also supported testing for the 1999 car. The SF3 was launched on January 7, at the Autosport International show in Birmingham's NEC. For 1999, the Stewart SF3 would utilise the new Cosworth CR1 V10 engine, a notably small and technically advanced power unit. Early in the season, Ford announced it would be the exclusive engine provider to Stewart leaving Minardi without a deal for 2000. Shortly after the launch of the new car, Stewart undertook an internal reshuffle of their backroom team. Paul Stewart became deputy chairman, with David Ring appointed Managing Director. Meanwhile, Gary Anderson joined as Technical Director and Darren Davis and Simon Smart joined from Jordan Grand Prix and CART respectively. By the mid-season, Paul Stewart was appointed as COO and Ring left the team.

Ahead of the British Grand Prix, the team released a major development for the SF3. It included modifications to the undertray, sidepods, raised exhausts and further modifications to the new Cosworth engine.

The 1999 livery was once again white, with a Tartan stripe running down each side of the cockpit. HSBC were the primary sponsor, with Ford heavily noted for their support on the engine cover. As the season progressed, the team secured additional sponsors including William Grant & Sons and Global Beach, who supported the team launching their first website.

== Racing performance ==
The season did not start particularly well for the SF3. Whilst lining up for the grid in Australia, both Barrichello and Herbert suffered oil leaks that led to small fires in their respective cars. The start was aborted and Barrichello was able to drive the T-car, whilst Herbert did not start the Grand Prix. Barrichello did, however, manage to secure a fifth place finish and two points for the team, despite picking up a stop-go penalty for speeding in the pit lane during the race. In Brazil, Barrichello managed to qualify third, and was running second behind Mika Hakkinen before his McLaren ran into issues. Barrichello briefly led his home Grand Prix, however would retire due to engine failure. Herbert would also retire from the race.

The SF3 scored its first podium finish in San Marino, when Barrichello managed to finish third behind Schumacher and Hakkinen. Herbert was running in fifth, but his engine failed with just three laps remaining ultimately being classified in tenth. In Monaco, further retirements came for Herbert who suffered suspension failure, and Barrichello who crashed at Swimming Pool whilst under pressure from Fisichella. In Spain, another series of bad luck hit the SF3 with Barrichello being disqualified due to a technical infinrgement with the undertray and skid tray, and Herbert once again retiring. The British driver had not crossed the finish line in the Stewart for all five races started in 1999 at this point. In Canada it was Herbert's time for good fortune, and he managed to place the SF3 in fifth gaining two points whilst Barrichello retired.

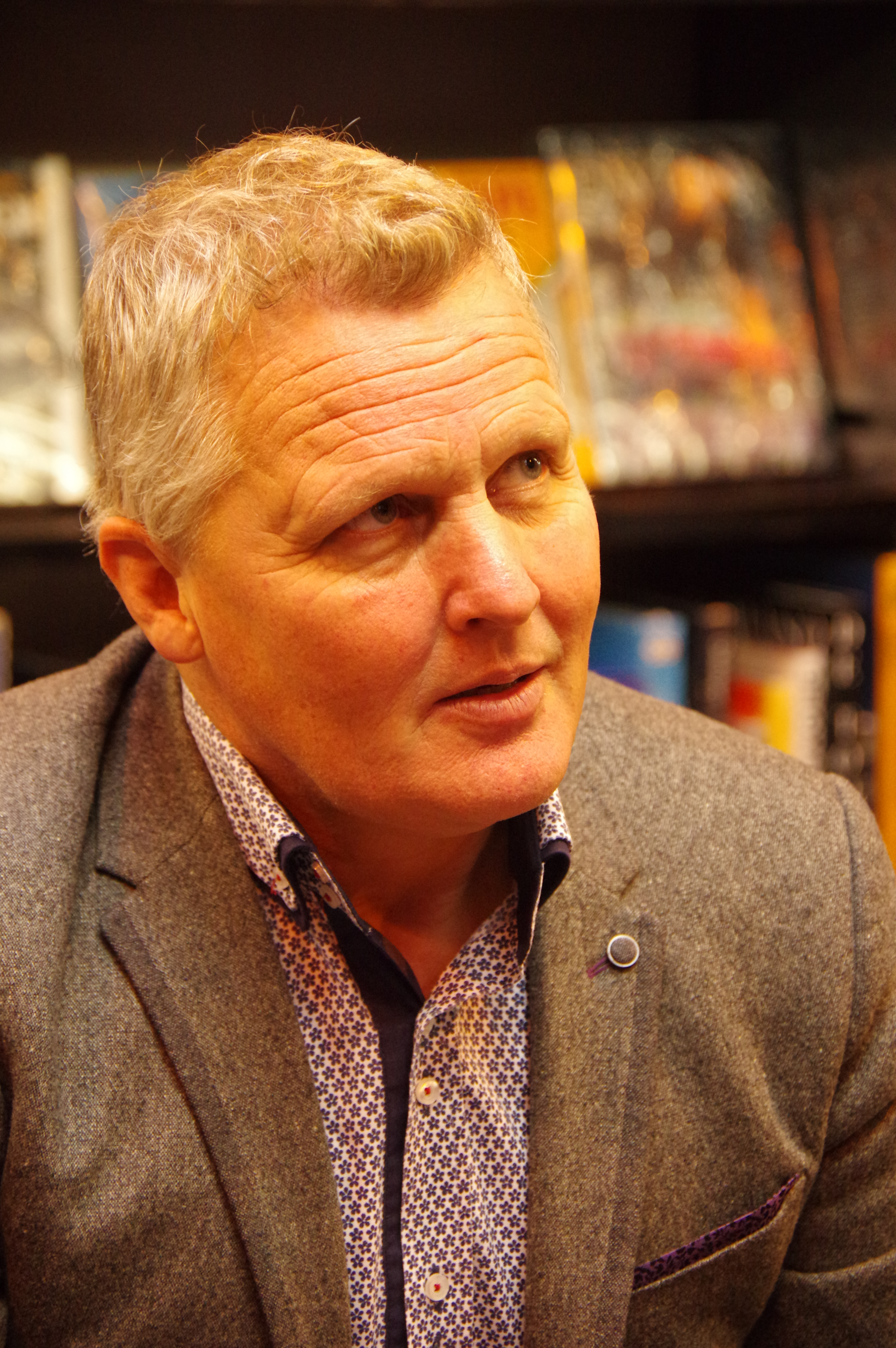
Johnny Herbert won the 1999 European Grand Prix driving the SF3

The French Grand Prix was another high point for Barrichello. He qualified on pole, the second of his career, and managed to finish in third and score the fastest lap of the race.

After another retirement, Herbert struggled for the next phase of Grand Prix, finishing four in a row, before double retirements. Whilst Barrichello managed to collect points at both the Hungarian and Italian Grand Prix. However, Herbert's day to shine with the SF3 was to come, at the European Grand Prix. After qualifying fourteenth on the grid, Herbert managed to win the race and team mate Barrichello finished in third meaning Stewart's first - and only - race win and double podium.

In Malaysia, Barrichello and Herbert would finish in fourth and fifth places, securing valuable points for the team. However, when the Ferrari's were disqualified for a technical infringement relating to the F399's bargeboards, the pair were promoted to second and third securing their fourth place in the Constructors' Championship. However, this was later overturned by the FIA and the Stewart's returned to their original placings.

Stewart's final Grand Prix would come at Japan, where the team were also saying goodbye to Barrichello who was signing for Scuderia Ferrari after three seasons with the team. Eddie Irvine was coming the other way to join Stewart ahead of their transfer to become Jaguar Racing. In the final race, both cars finished in seventh and eighth places. The team were able to secure fourth in the Constructors' Championship with 36 points.

== Later uses ==
In December 1999, Eddie Irvine would test the SF3 at Jerez before officially transferring to the team from January 2000. The car wore its sponsors, whilst Irvine wore blank overalls and a sponsor-less helmet.

In 2000, the car was fitted with Michelin tyres for their preparation in the 2001 season and was test driven by Tom Kristensen.

== Complete Formula One results ==
(key) (results in bold indicate pole position)

Year	Team	Engine	Tyres	Drivers	1	2	3	4	5	6	7	8	9	10	11	12	13	14	15	16	Points	WCC
1999	HSBC Stewart Ford	Ford V10	**B**		AUS	BRA	SMR	MON	ESP	CAN	FRA	GBR	AUT	GER	HUN	BEL	ITA	EUR	MAL	JPN	**36**	**4th**
1999	HSBC Stewart Ford	Ford V10	**B**	Rubens Barrichello	5	Ret	3	9	DSQ	Ret	**3**	8	Ret	Ret	5	10	4	3	5	8	**36**	**4th**
1999	HSBC Stewart Ford	Ford V10	**B**	Johnny Herbert	DNS	Ret	10	Ret	Ret	5	Ret	12	14	11	11	Ret	Ret	1	4	7	**36**	**4th**
