= Stewart SF02 =

Formula One racing car

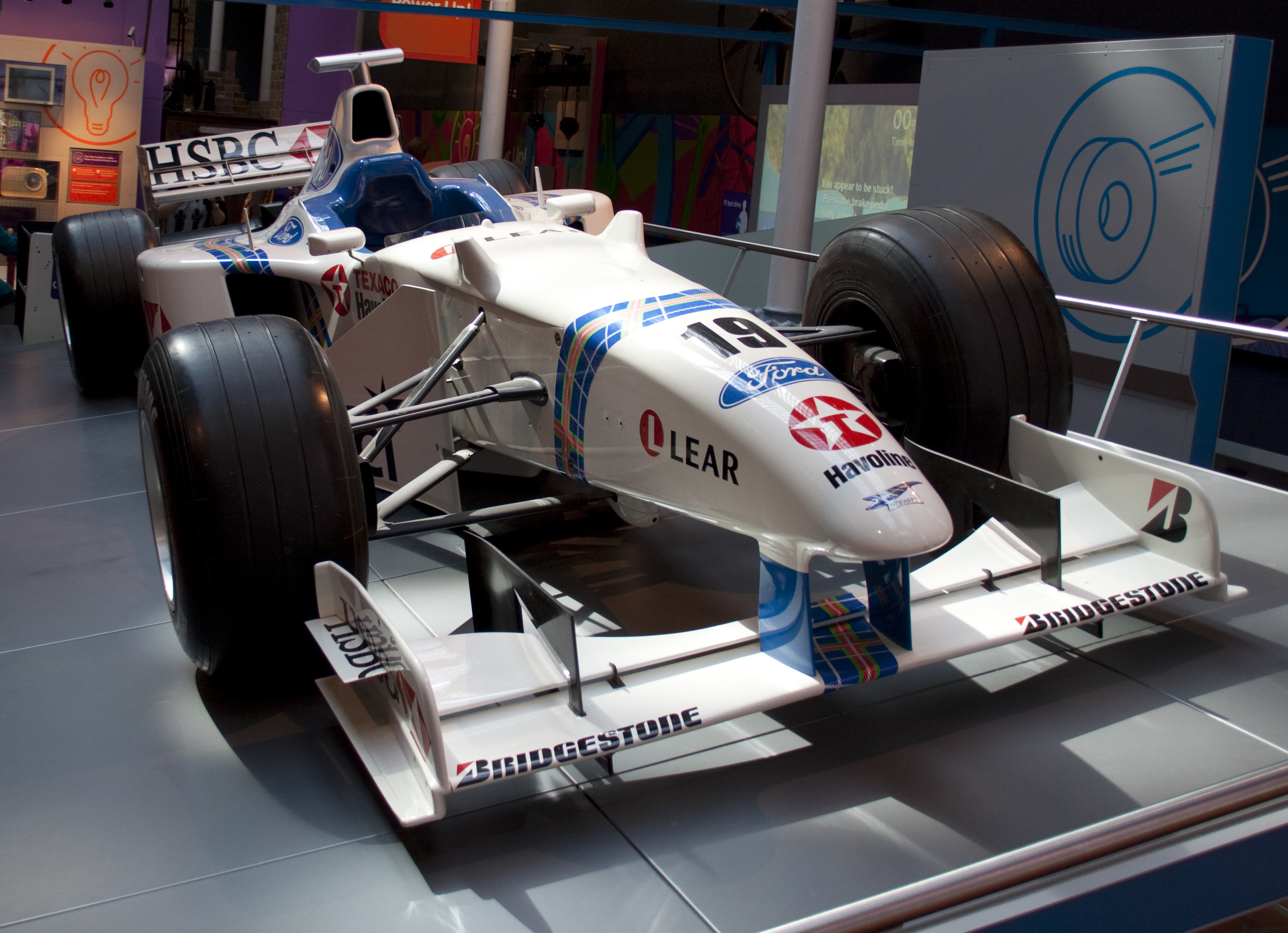
- The SF02 of Jan Magnussen on display at the National Museum of Scotland
- Category: Formula One
- Constructor: Stewart
- Designers: Alan Jenkins (Technical Director); Dave Amey (Chief Designer); Steve Foster (Head of Design - Composites); Dave Rendall (Head of Design - Mechanical); Eghbal Hamidy (Head of Aerodynamics); Nick Hayes (Engine Chief Designer - Ford Cosworth)
- Predecessor: SF01
- Successor: SF3

Technical specifications
- Chassis: carbon-fibre and honeycomb composite structure
- Suspension (front): double wishbones, pushrod
- Suspension (rear): double wishbones, pushrod
- Engine: Ford VJ Zetec-R 3.0-litre 72-degree V10
- Transmission: Stewart six-speed longitudinal sequential semi-automatic
- Power: 735 hp (548 kW) @ 16,000 rpm
- Fuel: Texaco
- Tyres: Bridgestone

Competition history
- Notable entrants: Stewart Ford
- Notable drivers: 18. (Brazil) Rubens Barrichello; 19. (Denmark) Jan Magnussen; 19. (Netherlands) Jos Verstappen
- Debut: 1998 Australian Grand Prix
- Last event: 1998 Japanese Grand Prix
Races	Wins	Poles	F/Laps
16	0	0	0
- Constructors' Championships: 0
- Drivers' Championships: 0

The Stewart SF02 was the car with which the Stewart Formula One team competed in the 1998 Formula One season. It was driven by Rubens Barrichello and Jan Magnussen at the start of 1998, with both in their second seasons with the team. Magnussen was dropped after the 1998 Canadian Grand Prix, despite scoring his first-ever point at the event, and replaced for the remainder of the season by Jos Verstappen.

== Overview ==
The Stewart team had entered F1 in 1997 with some success, yet made little if any progress in 1998. This was largely due to the pressures on a new team; having to race in a full F1 season for the first time, whilst preparing for next year. The car was late in production and therefore did not test enough to become a true front-running contender. Problems with reliability still remained as well, although these were not quite as bad as in 1997.

The team eventually finished eighth in the Constructors' Championship, with five points.

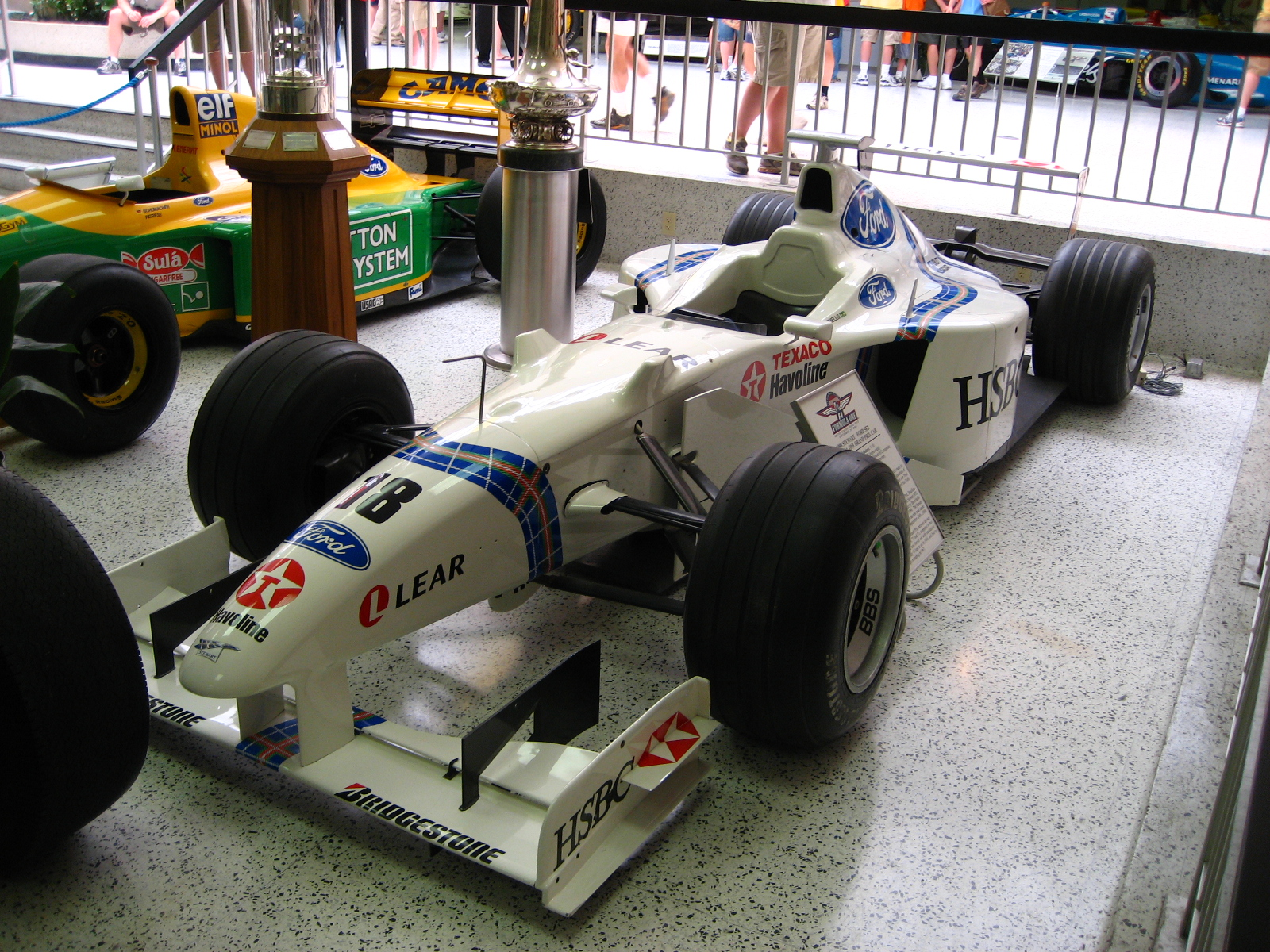
Rubens Barrichello's SF02 on display at the Indianapolis Motor Speedway Hall of Fame Museum.

== Livery ==
The livery was almost identical to the previous season with subtle changes on the tartan stripes; the team retained all of the sponsors with additional support from Lear Corporation and Visteon.

== Complete Formula One results ==
(key) (results in bold indicate pole position)

Year	Team	Engine	Tyres	Drivers	1	2	3	4	5	6	7	8	9	10	11	12	13	14	15	16	Points	WCC
1998	Stewart	Ford VJ Zetec-R V10	**B**		AUS	BRA	ARG	SMR	ESP	MON	CAN	FRA	GBR	AUT	GER	HUN	BEL	ITA	LUX	JPN	**5**	**8th**
1998	Stewart	Ford VJ Zetec-R V10	**B**	Rubens Barrichello	Ret	Ret	10	Ret	5	Ret	5	10	Ret	Ret	Ret	Ret	Ret	10	11	Ret	**5**	**8th**
1998	Stewart	Ford VJ Zetec-R V10	**B**	Jan Magnussen	Ret	10	Ret	Ret	12	Ret	6										**5**	**8th**
1998	Stewart	Ford VJ Zetec-R V10	**B**	Jos Verstappen								12	Ret	Ret	Ret	13	Ret	Ret	13	Ret	**5**	**8th**
