= Stewart SF01 =

Formula One racing car

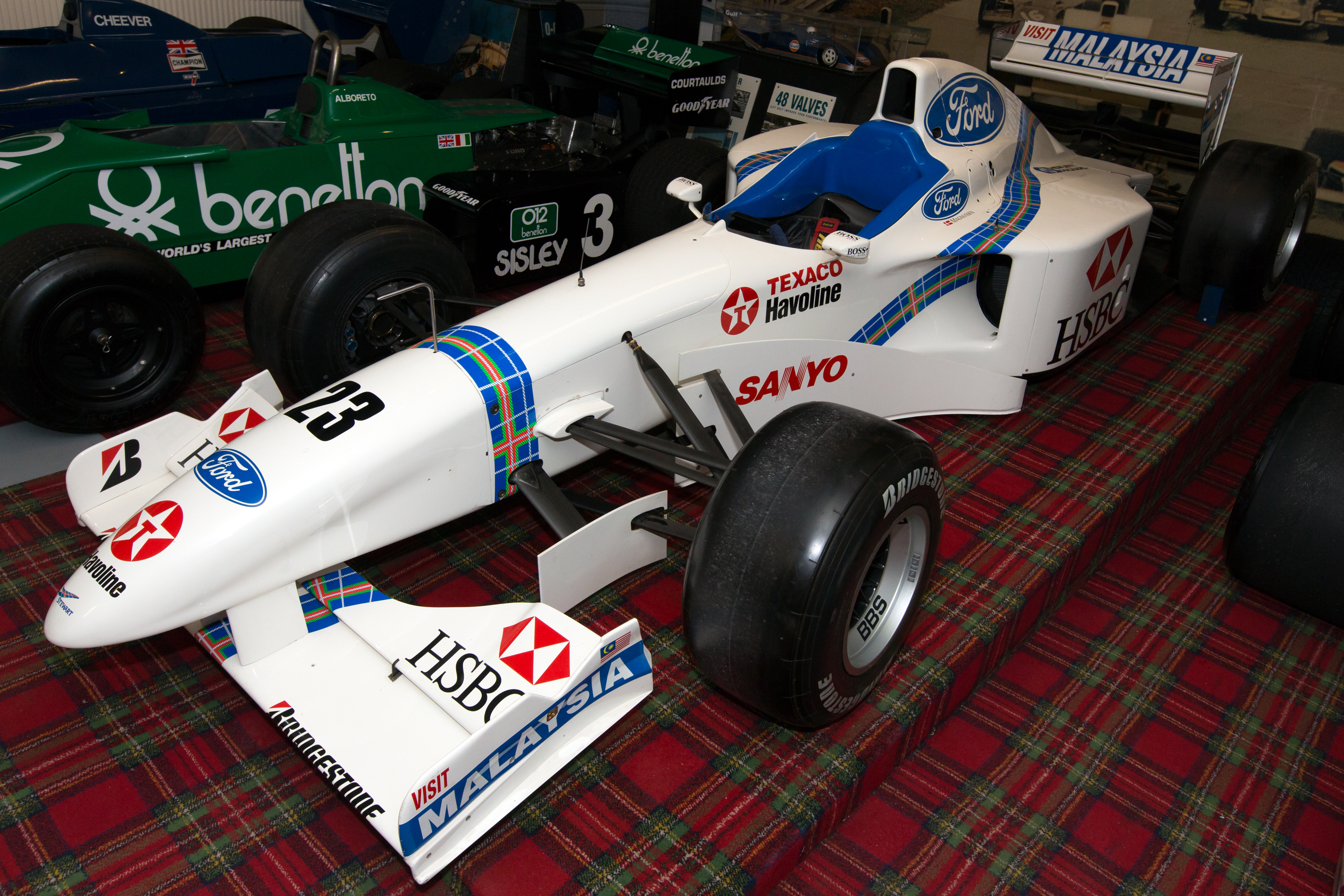
- The SF01 of Jan Magnussen on display at the Donington Grand Prix Collection
- Category: Formula One
- Constructor: Stewart
- Designers: Alan Jenkins (Technical Director); Dave Amey (Chief Designer); Richard McAinsh (Head of Design - Composites); Dave Rendall (Head of Design - Mechanical); Eghbal Hamidy (Head of Aerodynamics); Nick Hayes (Engine Chief Designer - Ford Cosworth)
- Successor: SF02

Technical specifications
- Chassis: carbon-fibre and honeycomb composite structure
- Suspension (front): double wishbones, pushrod
- Suspension (rear): double wishbones, pushrod
- Engine: Ford JD Zetec-R 3.0-litre 72-degree V10
- Transmission: Stewart/Xtrac six-speed longitudinal sequential semi-automatic
- Power: 710 hp (529.4 kW) @ 15,000 rpm
- Fuel: Texaco
- Tyres: Bridgestone

Competition history
- Notable entrants: HSBC Malaysia Stewart Ford
- Notable drivers: 22. (Brazil) Rubens Barrichello; 23. (Denmark) Jan Magnussen
- Debut: 1997 Australian Grand Prix
- Last event: 1997 European Grand Prix
Races	Wins	Poles	F/Laps
17	0	0	0
- Constructors' Championships: 0
- Drivers' Championships: 0

The Stewart SF01 was the car that the Stewart Formula One team competed with in the 1997 Formula One season, and the first car constructed by the team. It was driven by Rubens Barrichello and Jan Magnussen, the latter who had brief race experience with McLaren in 1995.

This was the first Formula One car to run on Texaco fuel since the McLaren M26 in 1979.

Ford supplied the engine of the car, and was also a sponsor.

== Launch and design ==
The car was launched in December 1996.

The SF01 was the team's first F1 car, designed by Alan Jenkins for three-time Drivers' Champion Jackie Stewart and son Paul to enter the series after several years in lower formulae such as Formula Three.

== Racing history ==
In an era when many smaller teams such as Forti, Pacific and Simtek went bankrupt, and fellow debutants MasterCard Lola folded almost immediately, Stewart's competent first year after building a car from scratch proved to be a welcome boost for the sport.

Whilst the car was quite competitive enough to regularly score points, it was frequently prevented from doing so by appalling unreliability; the team were only classified eight times out of a possible 34. The main reason for this were difficulties with mating the Ford engine with the car's oil tank. However, Barrichello drove to a fine second place at Monaco, the highlight of a season in which he largely eclipsed Magnussen.

The team eventually finished ninth in the Constructors' Championship, with six points.

== Livery ==
The car featured a white livery with a tartan stripes from the front to the rear the car. The team's main sponsor was HSBC. Jackie Stewart was also able to reach a deal with Malaysia's government to make the slogan "Visit Malaysia" be put on various points on the car.

== Complete Formula One results ==
(key) (results in bold indicate pole position)

Year	Team	Engine	Tyres	Drivers	1	2	3	4	5	6	7	8	9	10	11	12	13	14	15	16	17	Points	WCC
1997	Stewart	Ford V10	**B**		AUS	BRA	ARG	SMR	MON	ESP	CAN	FRA	GBR	GER	HUN	BEL	ITA	AUT	LUX	JPN	EUR	**6**	**9th**
1997	Stewart	Ford V10	**B**	Rubens Barrichello	Ret	Ret	Ret	Ret	2	Ret	Ret	Ret	Ret	Ret	Ret	Ret	13	14†	Ret	Ret	Ret	**6**	**9th**
1997	Stewart	Ford V10	**B**	Jan Magnussen	Ret	Ret	10†	Ret	7	13	Ret	Ret	Ret	Ret	Ret	12	Ret	Ret	Ret	Ret	9	**6**	**9th**

† Driver did not finish the race, but was still classified as they had completed at least 90% of the race distance.
