= 1999 Italian Grand Prix =

Race 13 of 16 in the 1999 Formula One World Championship
← Previous race	Next race →
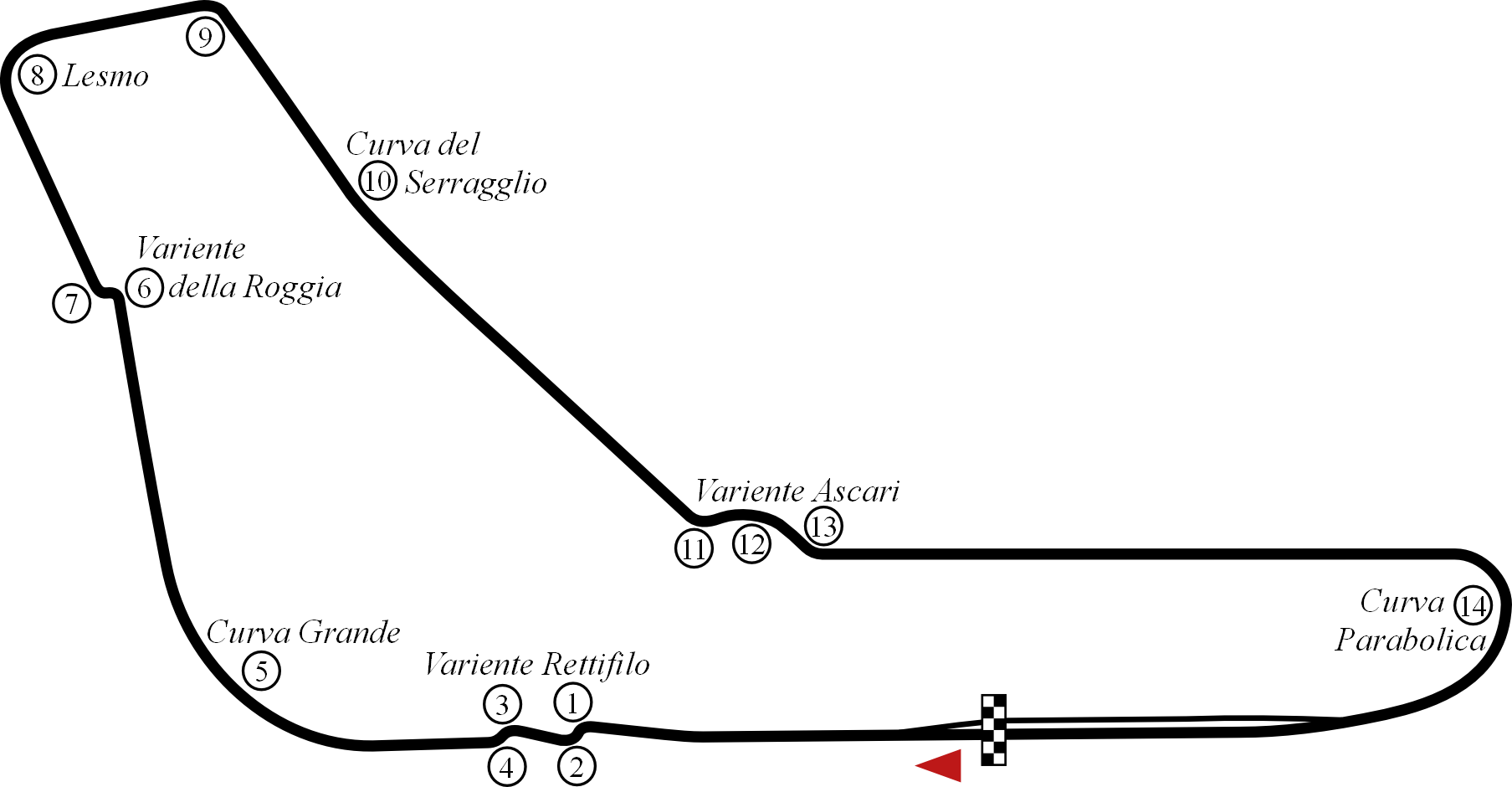
- Autodromo Nazionale di Monza (last modified in 1995)

Race details
- Date: 12 September 1999
- Official name: 70º Gran Premio Campari d'Italia
- Location: Autodromo Nazionale di Monza; Monza, Lombardy, Italy
- Course: Permanent racing facility
- Course length: 5.770 km (3.585 miles)
- Distance: 53 laps, 305.810 km (190.022 miles)
- Weather: Hot and dry with temperatures reaching up to 30 °C (86 °F)

Pole position
Driver	(Finland) Mika Häkkinen	McLaren-Mercedes
- Time: 1:22.432

Fastest lap
Driver	(Germany) Ralf Schumacher	Williams-Supertec
- Time: 1:25.579 on lap 48

Podium
First	(Germany) Heinz-Harald Frentzen	Jordan-Mugen-Honda
Second	(Germany) Ralf Schumacher	Williams-Supertec
Third	(Finland) Mika Salo	Ferrari

The 1999 Italian Grand Prix (formally the 70º Gran Premio Campari d'Italia) was a Formula One motor race held on 12 September 1999 at the Autodromo Nazionale di Monza near Monza, Italy. It was the thirteenth race of the 1999 Formula One World Championship, and the last held on this layout.

The 53-lap race was won by Heinz-Harald Frentzen, driving a Jordan-Mugen-Honda, after McLaren's Mika Häkkinen, seeking to defend his Drivers' Championship title, spun off while leading comfortably. Ralf Schumacher was second in a Williams-Supertec, with Mika Salo third in a Ferrari. Häkkinen's rival Eddie Irvine finished sixth in the other Ferrari, thus moving level on points with the Finn at the top of the Drivers' Championship. This was the first one-two finish between two German Formula One drivers since the 1997 Japanese Grand Prix.

Though the victory moved Frentzen to within ten points of Häkkinen and Irvine, it would turn out to be his third and last victory in Formula One, as well as the last for engine suppliers Mugen. It was also the Jordan team's only victory in dry conditions, their others coming in the rain.

This was Damon Hill's final classified Formula One race finish. He failed to finish each of his subsequent three races.

== Report ==
=== Qualifying ===
Going into the race, McLaren's Mika Häkkinen led the Drivers' Championship by a single point from Ferrari's Eddie Irvine, with Jordan's Heinz-Harald Frentzen and Häkkinen's team-mate David Coulthard also still in contention. Häkkinen was expected to do well on the fast Monza circuit, and duly claimed pole position by half a second from Frentzen. Coulthard was third, while Alessandro Zanardi, who had been having a poor year with Williams, was fourth, just ahead of teammate Ralf Schumacher. On Ferrari's home soil, Irvine had a poor qualifying session and could only manage eighth, behind teammate Mika Salo in sixth and Stewart's Rubens Barrichello – who had just signed with Ferrari to replace Irvine in 2000 – in seventh. Completing the top ten were Damon Hill in the second Jordan and Olivier Panis in the Prost.

=== Race ===
At the start, Häkkinen led away while Zanardi shot past Coulthard and Frentzen into second. Frentzen quickly re-passed Zanardi, but Coulthard fell further back, behind Schumacher and Salo. Meanwhile, at the back of the field, Minardi's Marc Gené tangled with Arrows' Pedro de la Rosa at the Roggia chicane and became the first retirement, while on the second lap Benetton's Giancarlo Fisichella and Sauber's Pedro Diniz both spun off at the Rettifilo chicane.

On lap 3, Zanardi ran over a kerb and damaged the underside of his car. He managed to hold on to third place for another 15 laps, while Häkkinen and Frentzen pulled away. Barrichello passed Coulthard on lap 11 and then Salo on lap 19, while Zanardi waved Schumacher past on lap 18. On lap 24, there was more drama at the back as Toranosuke Takagi in the second Arrows tried to overtake Luca Badoer in the second Minardi at the Rettifilo, only to run into the back of Badoer and end his race.

Barrichello overtook Zanardi on lap 26; Salo did the same at the start of lap 28. At this point, Häkkinen led Frentzen by eight seconds, with Schumacher a further two-and-a-half seconds back. But on lap 30, going into the Rettifilo, Häkkinen made a mistake changing gear – selecting first instead of second – and spun off, in a virtual repeat of his unforced error at San Marino earlier in the year. In a rare show of emotion, the Finn burst into tears at the side of the track.

Frentzen thus inherited the lead as the front-runners began to make their pit stops. When these had been completed, Salo had moved back ahead of Barrichello and into third, while Coulthard and Irvine had both leapfrogged Zanardi and were now fifth and sixth.

Over the closing laps, Frentzen retained a comfortable lead over Schumacher – despite the Williams driver setting the fastest lap of the race on lap 48 – while Coulthard tried unsuccessfully to find a way past Barrichello, allowing Salo to pull away from both of them. Frentzen's eventual margin of victory was 3.2 seconds, with a further eight seconds back to Salo and another six back to Barrichello. Coulthard finished half a second behind the Stewart driver, but nine ahead of Irvine, who himself held off Zanardi for the final point.

This point moved Irvine level with Häkkinen in the Drivers' Championship on 60 points apiece (Häkkinen retained the lead on countback with four wins against Irvine's three), while the win put Frentzen just ten points behind on 50, with Coulthard on 48. In the Constructors' Championship, Ferrari cut McLaren's lead to six points, 108 to 102.

== Classification ==
=== Qualifying ===
Pos	No	Driver	Constructor	Lap	Gap
1	1	(Finland) Mika Häkkinen	McLaren-Mercedes	1:22.432	
2	8	(Germany) Heinz-Harald Frentzen	Jordan-Mugen-Honda	1:22.926	+0.494
3	2	(United Kingdom) David Coulthard	McLaren-Mercedes	1:23.177	+0.745
4	5	(Italy) Alessandro Zanardi	Williams-Supertec	1:23.432	+1.000
5	6	(Germany) Ralf Schumacher	Williams-Supertec	1:23.636	+1.204
6	3	(Finland) Mika Salo	Ferrari	1:23.657	+1.225
7	16	(Brazil) Rubens Barrichello	Stewart-Ford	1:23.739	+1.307
8	4	(United Kingdom) Eddie Irvine	Ferrari	1:23.765	+1.333
9	7	(United Kingdom) Damon Hill	Jordan-Mugen-Honda	1:23.979	+1.547
10	18	(France) Olivier Panis	Prost-Peugeot	1:24.016	+1.584
11	22	(Canada) Jacques Villeneuve	BAR-Supertec	1:24.188	+1.756
12	19	(Italy) Jarno Trulli	Prost-Peugeot	1:24.293	+1.861
13	11	(France) Jean Alesi	Sauber-Petronas	1:24.591	+2.159
14	10	(Austria) Alexander Wurz	Benetton-Playlife	1:24.593	+2.161
15	17	(United Kingdom) Johnny Herbert	Stewart-Ford	1:24.594	+2.162
16	12	(Brazil) Pedro Diniz	Sauber-Petronas	1:24.596	+2.164
17	9	(Italy) Giancarlo Fisichella	Benetton-Playlife	1:24.862	+2.430
18	23	(Brazil) Ricardo Zonta	BAR-Supertec	1:25.114	+2.682
19	20	(Italy) Luca Badoer	Minardi-Ford	1:25.348	+2.916
20	21	(Spain) Marc Gené	Minardi-Ford	1:25.695	+3.263
21	14	(Spain) Pedro de la Rosa	Arrows	1:26.383	+3.951
22	15	(Japan) Toranosuke Takagi	Arrows	1:26.509	+4.077
107% time: 1:28.202

=== Race ===
Pos	No	Driver	Constructor	Laps	Time/Retired	Grid	Points
1	8	(Germany) Heinz-Harald Frentzen	Jordan-Mugen-Honda	53	1:17:02.923	2	10
2	6	(Germany) Ralf Schumacher	Williams-Supertec	53	+ 3.272	5	6
3	3	(Finland) Mika Salo	Ferrari	53	+ 11.932	6	4
4	16	(Brazil) Rubens Barrichello	Stewart-Ford	53	+ 17.630	7	3
5	2	(United Kingdom) David Coulthard	McLaren-Mercedes	53	+ 18.142	3	2
6	4	(United Kingdom) Eddie Irvine	Ferrari	53	+ 27.402	8	1
7	5	(Italy) Alessandro Zanardi	Williams-Supertec	53	+ 28.047	4	
8	22	(Canada) Jacques Villeneuve	BAR-Supertec	53	+ 41.797	11	
9	11	(France) Jean Alesi	Sauber-Petronas	53	+ 42.198	13	
10	7	(United Kingdom) Damon Hill	Jordan-Mugen-Honda	53	+ 56.259	9	
11	18	(France) Olivier Panis	Prost-Peugeot	52	Engine	10	
Ret	17	(United Kingdom) Johnny Herbert	Stewart-Ford	40	Clutch	15	
Ret	15	(Japan) Toranosuke Takagi	Arrows	35	Spun Off	22	
Ret	14	(Spain) Pedro de la Rosa	Arrows	35	Withdrew	21	
Ret	1	(Finland) Mika Häkkinen	McLaren-Mercedes	29	Spun Off	1	
Ret	19	(Italy) Jarno Trulli	Prost-Peugeot	29	Overheating	12	
Ret	23	(Brazil) Ricardo Zonta	BAR-Supertec	25	Wheel Bearing	18	
Ret	20	(Italy) Luca Badoer	Minardi-Ford	23	Collision	19	
Ret	10	(Austria) Alexander Wurz	Benetton-Playlife	11	Electrical	14	
Ret	12	(Brazil) Pedro Diniz	Sauber-Petronas	1	Spun Off	16	
Ret	9	(Italy) Giancarlo Fisichella	Benetton-Playlife	1	Spun Off	17	
Ret	21	(Spain) Marc Gené	Minardi-Ford	0	Collision	20	

== Championship standings after the race ==
Drivers' Championship standings

Pos	Driver	Points
1	(Finland) Mika Häkkinen	60
2	(United Kingdom) Eddie Irvine	60
3	(Germany) Heinz-Harald Frentzen	50
4	(United Kingdom) David Coulthard	48
5	(Germany) Michael Schumacher	32

Constructors' Championship standings

Pos	Constructor	Points
1	(United Kingdom) McLaren-Mercedes	108
2	(Italy) Ferrari	102
3	(Republic of Ireland) Jordan-Mugen-Honda	57
4	(United Kingdom) Williams-Supertec	30
5	(United Kingdom) Stewart-Ford	17

- Note: Only the top five positions are included for both sets of standings.

Previous race: 1999 Belgian Grand Prix	FIA Formula One World Championship; 1999 season	Next race: 1999 European Grand Prix
Previous race: 1998 Italian Grand Prix	Italian Grand Prix	Next race: 2000 Italian Grand Prix
