= 1999 Japanese Grand Prix =

Race 16 of 16 in the 1999 Formula One World Championship
← Previous race	Next race →
- Suzuka International Racing Course (last modified in 1991)

Race details
- Date: 31 October 1999
- Official name: XXV Fuji Television Japanese Grand Prix
- Location: Suzuka, Mie, Japan
- Course: Permanent racing facility
- Course length: 5.860 km (3.641 miles)
- Distance: 53 laps, 310.596 km (192.995 miles)
- Weather: Overcast, mild, dry
- Attendance: 318,000

Pole position
Driver	(Germany) Michael Schumacher	Ferrari
- Time: 1:37.470

Fastest lap
Driver	(Germany) Michael Schumacher	Ferrari
- Time: 1:41.319 on lap 31

Podium
First	(Finland) Mika Häkkinen	McLaren-Mercedes
Second	(Germany) Michael Schumacher	Ferrari
Third	(United Kingdom) Eddie Irvine	Ferrari

The 1999 Japanese Grand Prix, formally the XXV Fuji Television Japanese Grand Prix, was a Formula One motor race held on 31 October 1999 at the Suzuka Circuit. It was the sixteenth and final race of the 1999 Formula One World Championship. McLaren driver Mika Häkkinen won the 53-lap race after starting from second position. Michael Schumacher finished second in a Ferrari with teammate Eddie Irvine finishing third. Häkkinen's victory confirmed him as 1999 Drivers' Champion. Ferrari were also confirmed as Constructors' Champions.

This was the last Formula One race for Stewart Grand Prix, Toranosuke Takagi, Alessandro Zanardi and for the 1996 World Champion, Damon Hill.

== Report ==
=== Championship permutations ===
Going into this race, Ferrari's Eddie Irvine led the Drivers' Championship by four points from Häkkinen, 70 to 66. Häkkinen therefore needed to win the race, or to finish second with Irvine no higher than fifth, or to finish third with Irvine finishing outside the top six.

Victory for Häkkinen would give him the Championship regardless of where Irvine finished: even if Irvine finished second, both drivers would have 76 points but Häkkinen would have five wins to Irvine's four. Similarly, the Finn would be Champion if he finished second with Irvine fifth (as he would have three second places to Irvine's two), or if he finished third without Irvine scoring (as he would have four third places to Irvine's two).

=== Qualifying ===
Qualifying saw Irvine's Ferrari teammate, Michael Schumacher, take pole position with Häkkinen alongside on the front row. David Coulthard was third in the second McLaren, with Heinz-Harald Frentzen fourth in the Jordan. Irvine struggled throughout, also suffering a heavy crash at the Hairpin, and could only manage fifth, over 1.5 seconds slower than Schumacher and over 1.1 slower than Häkkinen. The top ten was completed by the Prosts of Olivier Panis and Jarno Trulli, Johnny Herbert in the Stewart, Ralf Schumacher in the Williams and Jean Alesi in the Sauber.

=== Race ===
Häkkinen beat Schumacher off the line, with Panis charging into third ahead of Irvine, Coulthard and Frentzen. Zanardi pulled off the track into the pits in the second Williams with electrical problems on lap 1. The Finn quickly built a comfortable lead, and it became clear that the Ferraris could not match him. As Trulli in the second Prost retired when his engine failed on lap 4.

Panis retired when his alternator broke on lap 20, meanwhile Hill retired after spinning off the track but managed to come back to the pits to retire with mental driver fatigue on lap 21 in his final Grand Prix, Coulthard passed Irvine for third during the first round of pit stops. On lap 34, Coulthard made a mistake and spun into a wall, losing his nose. He pitted and rejoined a lap down, just in front of Schumacher. It was alleged that the Scot deliberately held up the German driver, before retiring several laps later with a hydraulic failure. Schumacher later criticized Coulthard's behaviour.

Häkkinen eventually took the chequered flag five seconds ahead of Schumacher and, with it, his second Drivers' Championship. Irvine finished a minute and a half behind Schumacher in third, nonetheless helping Ferrari secure their first Constructors' Championship since 1983. The minor points went to Frentzen, Ralf Schumacher and Alesi.

== Classification ==
=== Qualifying ===
Pos	No	Driver	Constructor	Time	Gap
1	3	(Germany) Michael Schumacher	Ferrari	1:37.470	
2	1	(Finland) Mika Häkkinen	McLaren-Mercedes	1:37.820	+0.350
3	2	(United Kingdom) David Coulthard	McLaren-Mercedes	1:38.239	+0.769
4	8	(Germany) Heinz-Harald Frentzen	Jordan-Mugen-Honda	1:38.696	+1.226
5	4	(United Kingdom) Eddie Irvine	Ferrari	1:38.975	+1.505
6	18	(France) Olivier Panis	Prost-Peugeot	1:39.623	+2.153
7	19	(Italy) Jarno Trulli	Prost-Peugeot	1:39.644	+2.174
8	17	(United Kingdom) Johnny Herbert	Stewart-Ford	1:39.706	+2.236
9	6	(Germany) Ralf Schumacher	Williams-Supertec	1:39.717	+2.247
10	11	(France) Jean Alesi	Sauber-Petronas	1:39.721	+2.251
11	22	(Canada) Jacques Villeneuve	BAR-Supertec	1:39.732	+2.262
12	7	(United Kingdom) Damon Hill	Jordan-Mugen-Honda	1:40.140	+2.670
13	16	(Brazil) Rubens Barrichello	Stewart-Ford	1:40.140	+2.670
14	9	(Italy) Giancarlo Fisichella	Benetton-Playlife	1:40.261	+2.791
15	10	(Austria) Alexander Wurz	Benetton-Playlife	1:40.303	+2.833
16	5	(Italy) Alessandro Zanardi	Williams-Supertec	1:40.403	+2.933
17	12	(Brazil) Pedro Diniz	Sauber-Petronas	1:40.740	+3.270
18	23	(Brazil) Ricardo Zonta	BAR-Supertec	1:40.861	+3.391
19	15	(Japan) Toranosuke Takagi	Arrows	1:41.067	+3.597
20	21	(Spain) Marc Gené	Minardi-Ford	1:41.529	+4.059
21	14	(Spain) Pedro de la Rosa	Arrows	1:41.708	+4.238
22	20	(Italy) Luca Badoer	Minardi-Ford	1:42.515	+5.045
107% time: 1:44.293

=== Race ===
Pos	No	Driver	Constructor	Laps	Time/Retired	Grid	Points
1	1	(Finland) Mika Häkkinen	McLaren-Mercedes	53	1:31:18.785	2	10
2	3	(Germany) Michael Schumacher	Ferrari	53	+ 5.015	1	6
3	4	(United Kingdom) Eddie Irvine	Ferrari	53	+ 1:35.688	5	4
4	8	(Germany) Heinz-Harald Frentzen	Jordan-Mugen-Honda	53	+ 1:38.635	4	3
5	6	(Germany) Ralf Schumacher	Williams-Supertec	53	+ 1:39.494	9	2
6	11	(France) Jean Alesi	Sauber-Petronas	52	+ 1 Lap	10	1
7	17	(United Kingdom) Johnny Herbert	Stewart-Ford	52	+ 1 Lap	8	
8	16	(Brazil) Rubens Barrichello	Stewart-Ford	52	+ 1 Lap	13	
9	22	(Canada) Jacques Villeneuve	BAR-Supertec	52	+ 1 Lap	11	
10	10	(Austria) Alexander Wurz	Benetton-Playlife	52	+ 1 Lap	15	
11	12	(Brazil) Pedro Diniz	Sauber-Petronas	52	+ 1 Lap	17	
12	23	(Brazil) Ricardo Zonta	BAR-Supertec	52	+ 1 Lap	18	
13	14	(Spain) Pedro de la Rosa	Arrows	51	+ 2 Laps	21	
14	9	(Italy) Giancarlo Fisichella	Benetton-Playlife	47	Engine	14	
Ret	15	(Japan) Toranosuke Takagi	Arrows	43	Gearbox	19	
Ret	20	(Italy) Luca Badoer	Minardi-Ford	43	Engine	22	
Ret	2	(United Kingdom) David Coulthard	McLaren-Mercedes	39	Hydraulics	3	
Ret	21	(Spain) Marc Gené	Minardi-Ford	31	Gearbox	20	
Ret	7	(United Kingdom) Damon Hill	Jordan-Mugen-Honda	21	Mental Fatigue	12	
Ret	18	(France) Olivier Panis	Prost-Peugeot	19	Alternator	6	
Ret	19	(Italy) Jarno Trulli	Prost-Peugeot	3	Engine	7	
Ret	5	(Italy) Alessandro Zanardi	Williams-Supertec	0	Electrical	16	

== Championship standings after the race ==
Drivers' Championship standings

Pos	Driver	Points
1	(Finland) Mika Häkkinen	76
2	(United Kingdom) Eddie Irvine	74
3	(Germany) Heinz-Harald Frentzen	54
4	(United Kingdom) David Coulthard	48
5	(Germany) Michael Schumacher	44

Constructors Championship standings

Pos	Constructor	Points
1	(Italy) Ferrari	128
2	(United Kingdom) McLaren-Mercedes	124
3	(Republic of Ireland) Jordan-Mugen-Honda	61
4	(United Kingdom) Stewart-Ford	36
5	(United Kingdom) Williams-Supertec	35

- Note: Only the top five positions are included for both sets of standings.

Previous race: 1999 Malaysian Grand Prix	FIA Formula One World Championship; 1999 season	Next race: 2000 Australian Grand Prix
Previous race: 1998 Japanese Grand Prix	Japanese Grand Prix	Next race: 2000 Japanese Grand Prix
