= Supertec =

Dutch Formula One engine brand

Super Performance Competition Engineering BV
- Trade name: Supertec
- Type: Besloten Vennootschap
- Industry: Automotive automobile racing (motorsport)
- Founded: The Netherlands 1998 (28 years ago)
- Defunct: 2001 (25 years ago)
- Fate: Assets bought by Renault Sport
- Headquarters: The Netherlands
- Key people: Bruno Michel and Flavio Briatore
- Products: Internal combustion engines and car engine assembly
- Services: Performance engineering, Precision manufacturing

Supertec was a brand of Formula One engines supplied by Dutch company Super Performance Competition Engineering BV, managed by Flavio Briatore and Bruno Michel. Supertec engines were updated 1997 Renault RS9 units, built by Mecachrome.

In May 1998 Super Performance Competition Engineering signed an exclusive distribution agreement with Mecachrome to begin in the 1999 season. The engines were purchased and rebadged as Supertec. Supertecs powered Williams, Benetton and BAR in 1999, and Benetton and Arrows in 2000. The Benetton team rebadged the engines as Playlife.

After the 2000 season, Supertec collapsed due to financial problems and Renault Sport F1 bought back Supertec's assets in 2001.

== Complete Formula One World Championship results ==
Supertec as a Formula One engine manufacturer
Formula One World Championship career
- First entry: 1999 Australian Grand Prix
- Last entry: 2000 Malaysian Grand Prix
- Races entered: 82
- Chassis: British American Racing, Benetton, Williams, Arrows
- Constructors' Championships: 0
- Drivers' Championships: 0
- Race victories: 0
- Podiums: 7
- Points: 78
- Pole positions: 0
- Fastest laps: 1

(key) (results in bold indicate pole position) (Races in italics indicate fastest lap)

Year	Entrant	Chassis	Engine	Tyres	Drivers	1	2	3	4	5	6	7	8	9	10	11	12	13	14	15	16	17	Points	WCC
1999	British American Racing	BAR 01	FB01 3.0 V10	B		AUS	BRA	SMR	MON	ESP	CAN	FRA	GBR	AUT	GER	HUN	BEL	ITA	EUR	MAL	JPN		0	NC
1999	British American Racing	BAR 01	FB01 3.0 V10	B	(Canada) Jacques Villeneuve	Ret	Ret	Ret	Ret	Ret	Ret	Ret	Ret	Ret	Ret	Ret	15	8	10	Ret	9		0	NC
1999	British American Racing	BAR 01	FB01 3.0 V10	B	(Brazil) Ricardo Zonta	Ret	DNQ				Ret	9	Ret	15	Ret	13	Ret	Ret	8	Ret	12		0	NC
1999	British American Racing	BAR 01	FB01 3.0 V10	B	(Finland) Mika Salo			7	Ret	8													0	NC
1999	Mild Seven Benetton Playlife	Benetton B199	Playlife FB01 3.0 V10	B	(Italy) Giancarlo Fisichella	4	Ret	5	5	9	2	Ret	7	12	Ret	Ret	11	Ret	Ret	11	14		16	6th
1999	Mild Seven Benetton Playlife	Benetton B199	Playlife FB01 3.0 V10	B	(Austria) Alexander Wurz	Ret	7	Ret	6	10	Ret	Ret	10	5	7	7	14	Ret	Ret	8	10		16	6th
1999	Winfield Williams	Williams FW21	FB01 3.0 V10	B	(Germany) Ralf Schumacher	3	4	Ret	Ret	5	4	4	3	Ret	4	9	5	2	4	Ret	5		35	5th
1999	Winfield Williams	Williams FW21	FB01 3.0 V10	B	(Italy) Alessandro Zanardi	Ret	Ret	11	8	Ret	Ret	Ret	11	Ret	Ret	Ret	8	7	Ret	10	Ret		35	5th
2000	Arrows F1 Team	Arrows A21	FB02 3.0 V10	B		AUS	BRA	SMR	GBR	ESP	EUR	MON	CAN	FRA	AUT	GER	HUN	BEL	ITA	USA	JPN	MAL	7	7th
2000	Arrows F1 Team	Arrows A21	FB02 3.0 V10	B	(Spain) Pedro de la Rosa	Ret	8	Ret	Ret	Ret	6	DNS	Ret	Ret	Ret	6	16	16	Ret	Ret	12	Ret	7	7th
2000	Arrows F1 Team	Arrows A21	FB02 3.0 V10	B	(Netherlands) Jos Verstappen	Ret	7	14	Ret	Ret	Ret	Ret	5	Ret	Ret	Ret	13	15	4	Ret	Ret	10	7	7th
2000	Mild Seven Benetton Playlife	Benetton B200	Playlife FB02 3.0 V10	B	(Italy) Giancarlo Fisichella	5	2	11	7	9	5	3	3	9	Ret	Ret	Ret	Ret	11	Ret	14	9	20	4th
2000	Mild Seven Benetton Playlife	Benetton B200	Playlife FB02 3.0 V10	B	(Austria) Alexander Wurz	7	Ret	9	9	10	12	Ret	9	Ret	10	Ret	11	13	5	10	Ret	7	20	4th
