= 1999 Hungarian Grand Prix =

Race 11 of 16 in the 1999 Formula One World Championship
← Previous race	Next race →
- Hungaroring (modified this year)

Race details
- Date: 15 August 1999
- Official name: XV Marlboro Magyar Nagydíj
- Location: Hungaroring; Mogyoród, Pest, Hungary
- Course: Permanent racing facility
- Course length: 3.973 km (2.469 miles)
- Distance: 77 laps, 305.921 km (190.090 miles)
- Weather: Partially cloudy, hot, dry, Air: 25 °C (77 °F), Track 37 °C (99 °F)

Pole position
Driver	(Finland) Mika Häkkinen	McLaren-Mercedes
- Time: 1:18.156

Fastest lap
Driver	(United Kingdom) David Coulthard	McLaren-Mercedes
- Time: 1:20.699 on lap 69

Podium
First	(Finland) Mika Häkkinen	McLaren-Mercedes
Second	(United Kingdom) David Coulthard	McLaren-Mercedes
Third	(United Kingdom) Eddie Irvine	Ferrari

The 1999 Hungarian Grand Prix (formally the XV Marlboro Magyar Nagydíj) was a Formula One motor race held on 15 August 1999 at the Hungaroring in Mogyoród, Pest, Hungary. It was the eleventh race of the 1999 FIA Formula One World Championship.

The 77-lap race was won from pole position by Mika Häkkinen, driving a McLaren-Mercedes. Häkkinen's teammate David Coulthard finished second, while Drivers' Championship rival Eddie Irvine finished third in his Ferrari. The top six was completed by Heinz-Harald Frentzen in the Jordan, Rubens Barrichello in the Stewart, and Damon Hill in the other Jordan.

The win, Häkkinen's fourth of the season, moved him to within two points of Irvine in the Drivers' Championship, while McLaren reduced Ferrari's lead in the Constructors' Championship to four points.

== Classification ==
=== Qualifying ===
Pos	No	Driver	Constructor	Lap	Gap
1	1	(Finland) Mika Häkkinen	McLaren-Mercedes	1:18.156	
2	4	(United Kingdom) Eddie Irvine	Ferrari	1:18.263	+0.107
3	2	(United Kingdom) David Coulthard	McLaren-Mercedes	1:18.384	+0.228
4	9	(Italy) Giancarlo Fisichella	Benetton-Playlife	1:18.515	+0.359
5	8	(Germany) Heinz-Harald Frentzen	Jordan-Mugen-Honda	1:18.664	+0.508
6	7	(United Kingdom) Damon Hill	Jordan-Mugen-Honda	1:18.667	+0.511
7	10	(Austria) Alexander Wurz	Benetton-Playlife	1:18.733	+0.577
8	16	(Brazil) Rubens Barrichello	Stewart-Ford	1:19.095	+0.939
9	22	(Canada) Jacques Villeneuve	BAR-Supertec	1:19.127	+0.971
10	17	(United Kingdom) Johnny Herbert	Stewart-Ford	1:19.389	+1.233
11	11	(France) Jean Alesi	Sauber-Petronas	1:19.390	+1.234
12	12	(Brazil) Pedro Diniz	Sauber-Petronas	1:19.782	+1.626
13	19	(Italy) Jarno Trulli	Prost-Peugeot	1:19.788	+1.632
14	18	(France) Olivier Panis	Prost-Peugeot	1:19.841	+1.685
15	5	(Italy) Alessandro Zanardi	Williams-Supertec	1:19.924	+1.768
16	6	(Germany) Ralf Schumacher	Williams-Supertec	1:19.945	+1.789
17	23	(Brazil) Ricardo Zonta	BAR-Supertec	1:20.060	+1.904
18	3	(Finland) Mika Salo	Ferrari	1:20.369	+2.213
19	20	(Italy) Luca Badoer	Minardi-Ford	1:20.961	+2.805
20	14	(Spain) Pedro de la Rosa	Arrows	1:21.328	+3.172
21	15	(Japan) Toranosuke Takagi	Arrows	1:21.675	+3.519
22	21	(Spain) Marc Gené	Minardi-Ford	1:21.867	+3.711
107% time: 1:23.627

=== Race ===
Pos	No	Driver	Constructor	Laps	Time/Retired	Grid	Points
1	1	(Finland) Mika Häkkinen	McLaren-Mercedes	77	1:46:23.536	1	10
2	2	(United Kingdom) David Coulthard	McLaren-Mercedes	77	+ 9.706	3	6
3	4	(United Kingdom) Eddie Irvine	Ferrari	77	+ 27.228	2	4
4	8	(Germany) Heinz-Harald Frentzen	Jordan-Mugen-Honda	77	+ 31.815	5	3
5	16	(Brazil) Rubens Barrichello	Stewart-Ford	77	+ 43.808	8	2
6	7	(United Kingdom) Damon Hill	Jordan-Mugen-Honda	77	+ 55.726	6	1
7	10	(Austria) Alexander Wurz	Benetton-Playlife	77	+ 1:01.012	7	
8	19	(Italy) Jarno Trulli	Prost-Peugeot	76	+ 1 Lap	13	
9	6	(Germany) Ralf Schumacher	Williams-Supertec	76	+ 1 Lap	16	
10	18	(France) Olivier Panis	Prost-Peugeot	76	+ 1 Lap	14	
11	17	(United Kingdom) Johnny Herbert	Stewart-Ford	76	+ 1 Lap	10	
12	3	(Finland) Mika Salo	Ferrari	75	+ 2 Laps	18	
13	23	(Brazil) Ricardo Zonta	BAR-Supertec	75	+ 2 Laps	17	
14	20	(Italy) Luca Badoer	Minardi-Ford	75	+ 2 Laps	19	
15	14	(Spain) Pedro de la Rosa	Arrows	75	+ 2 Laps	20	
16	11	(France) Jean Alesi	Sauber-Petronas	74	Fuel Pressure	11	
17	21	(Spain) Marc Gené	Minardi-Ford	74	+ 3 Laps	22	
Ret	22	(Canada) Jacques Villeneuve	BAR-Supertec	60	Clutch	9	
Ret	9	(Italy) Giancarlo Fisichella	Benetton-Playlife	52	Engine	4	
Ret	15	(Japan) Toranosuke Takagi	Arrows	26	Transmission	21	
Ret	12	(Brazil) Pedro Diniz	Sauber-Petronas	19	Spun Off	12	
Ret	5	(Italy) Alessandro Zanardi	Williams-Supertec	10	Differential	15	

== Championship standings after the race ==
Drivers' Championship standings

Pos	Driver	Points
1	(United Kingdom) Eddie Irvine	56
2	(Finland) Mika Häkkinen	54
3	(United Kingdom) David Coulthard	36
4	(Germany) Heinz-Harald Frentzen	36
5	(Germany) Michael Schumacher	32

Constructors' Championship standings

Pos	Constructor	Points
1	(Italy) Ferrari	94
2	(United Kingdom) McLaren-Mercedes	90
3	(Republic of Ireland) Jordan-Mugen-Honda	42
4	(United Kingdom) Williams-Supertec	22
5	(Italy) Benetton-Playlife	16

- Note: Only the top five positions are included for both sets of standings.

Previous race: 1999 German Grand Prix	FIA Formula One World Championship; 1999 season	Next race: 1999 Belgian Grand Prix
Previous race: 1998 Hungarian Grand Prix	Hungarian Grand Prix	Next race: 2000 Hungarian Grand Prix
