= Stewart Grand Prix =

Former Formula One constructor and racing team

Stewart
- Full name: HSBC Malaysia Stewart Ford (1997); HSBC Stewart Ford (1998–1999)
- Base: Milton Keynes, United Kingdom
- Founder(s): Jackie Stewart; Paul Stewart
- Noted staff: Alan Jenkins; Eghbal Hamidy; Gary Anderson
- Noted drivers: (Brazil) Rubens Barrichello (United Kingdom) Johnny Herbert (Denmark) Jan Magnussen (Netherlands) Jos Verstappen
- Next name: Jaguar Racing

Formula One World Championship career
- First entry: 1997 Australian Grand Prix
- Races entered: 49
- Engines: Ford
- Constructors' Championships: 0
- Drivers' Championships: 0
- Race victories: 1
- Podiums: 5
- Points: 47
- Pole positions: 1
- Fastest laps: 0
- Final entry: 1999 Japanese Grand Prix

Stewart Grand Prix Limited was a Formula One constructor and racing team founded by triple Formula One champion Jackie Stewart and his son Paul Stewart in 1996. The team competed in F1, as the Ford works-supported team, for only three seasons, from 1997 to 1999. The 1999 season was by far its strongest, yielding one win (Johnny Herbert at the European Grand Prix) and one pole position (Rubens Barrichello at the French Grand Prix) en route to finishing fourth overall in the Constructors Championship.

At the end of 1999, Ford bought the team outright and it was renamed Jaguar Racing. In 2004 Jaguar Racing was sold to energy drink company Red Bull GmbH and was rebranded Red Bull Racing in 2005.

== Origins ==
The team's origins are traced back to the end of 1988 when Jackie Stewart's son Paul set up Paul Stewart Racing, having bought the Gary Evans Motorsport Team. This team entered the 1989 British Formula 3 season with a workforce of 10 employees. The team attracted the sponsor Camel. Paul Stewart drove the car alongside German Otto Rensing. The team had a single win with Stewart at Snetterton. In 1990, the team expanded with a move to new headquarters in Milton Keynes, and was divided into three sections; preparation for European Formula 3000, Formula 3 and Formula Vauxhall Lotus. Within a few years, the team enjoyed success, winning 12 titles and 119 races in various categories.

Through 1995 Stewart declined to enter Formula 1, considering that short-lived entries Simtek, Pacific and Forti either had folded or looked likely to fold. This position was reversed in January 1996 when Jackie Stewart secured a five-year development deal with Ford to make it a factory team. Before, Ford had been in a deal as a factory engine supplier to Sauber. The team was also sponsored by the government of Malaysia as a promotion for the country. Stewart were in consultation with John Barnard about a business plan with a budget of £24 million.

== Racing history ==
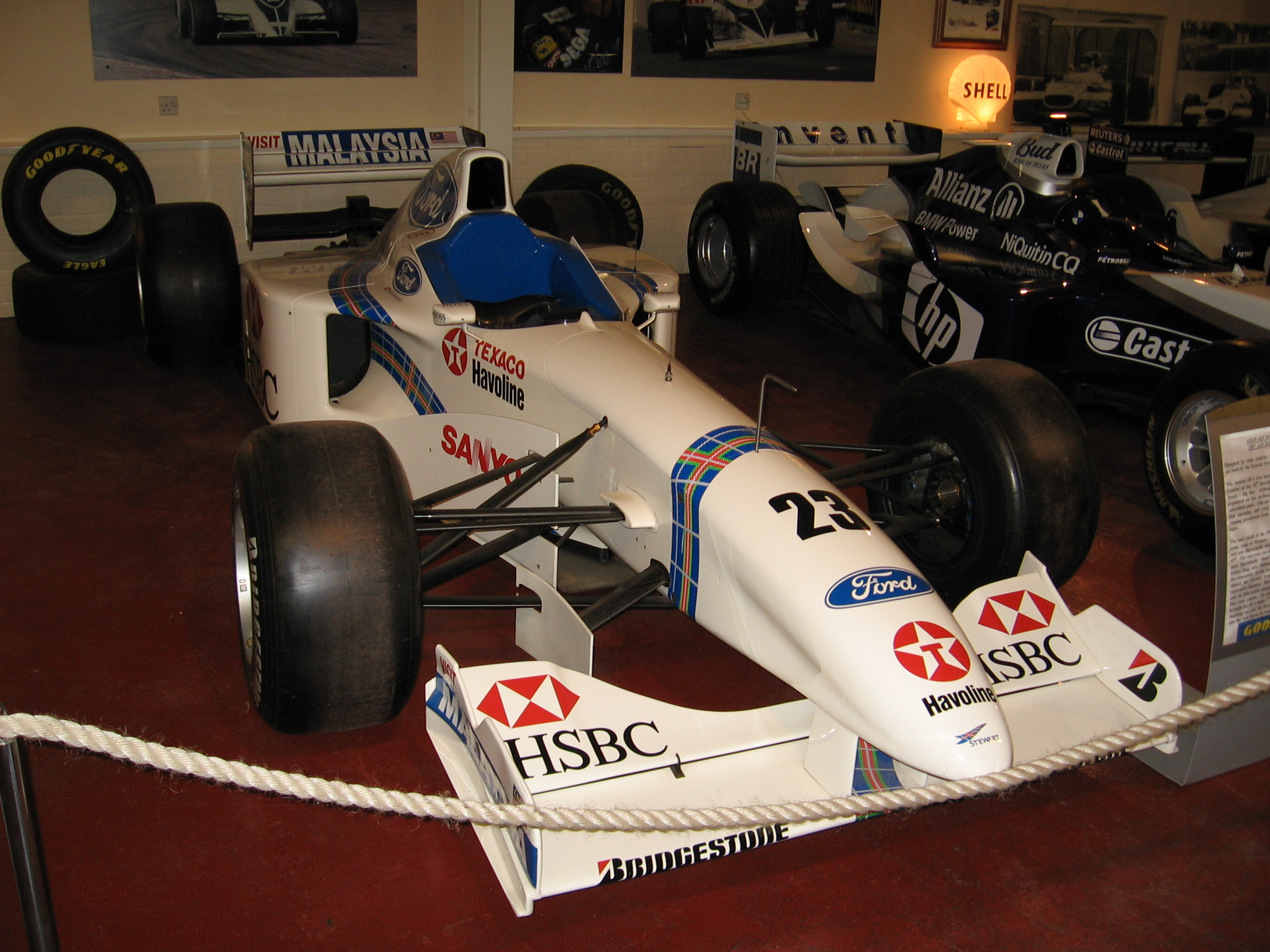
The Stewart SF01, driven by Jan Magnussen in Stewart's debut season. From The Donington Collection.

=== 1997 ===
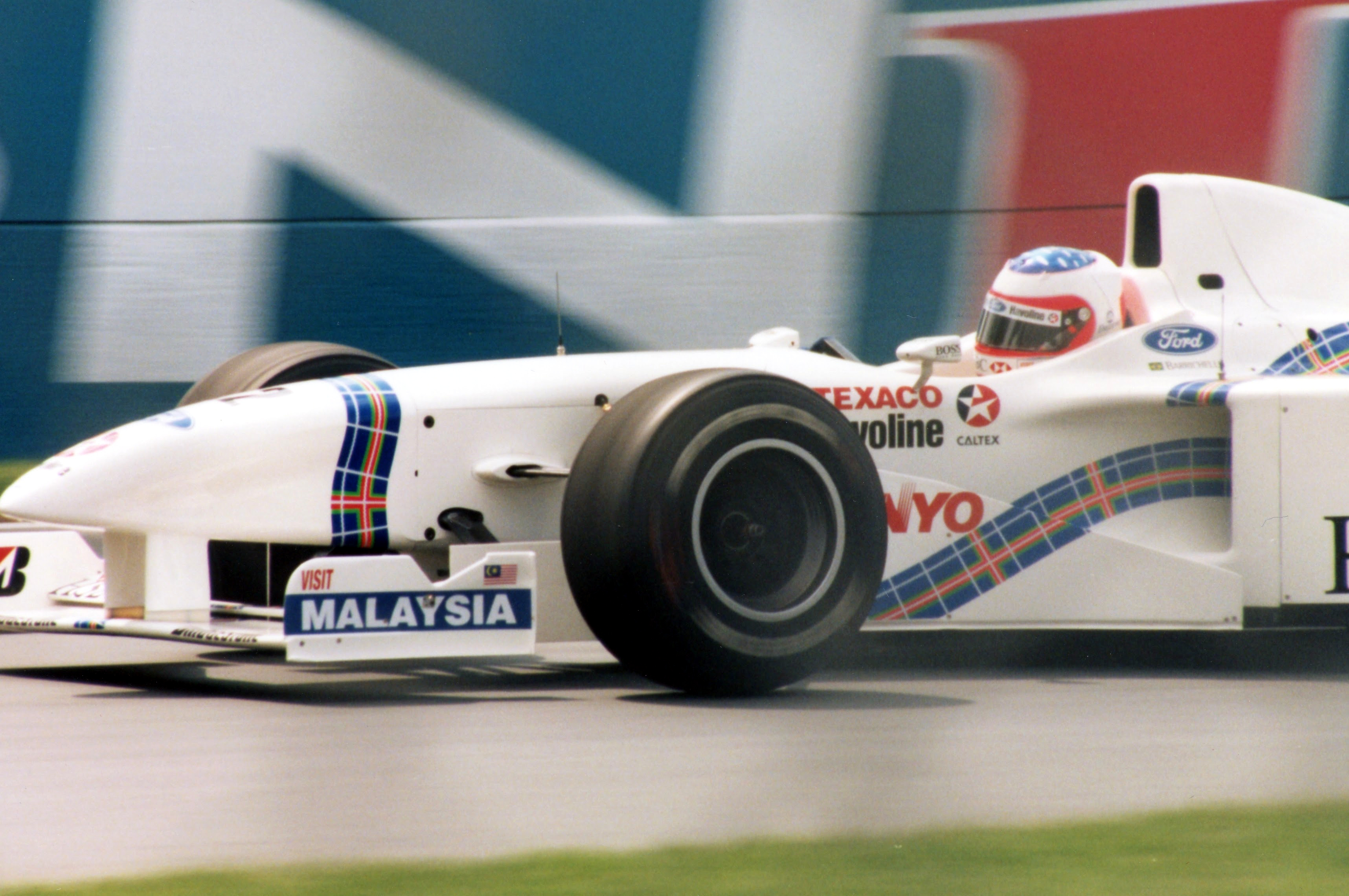
Rubens Barrichello at the 1997 Canadian Grand Prix. The tartan livery indicates Stewart's origins in Scotland.

The first car, named the Stewart SF01 was launched on 19 December 1996. With factory backing from Ford as well as free engines, Stewart Grand Prix entered the 1997 Australian Grand Prix with drivers Rubens Barrichello and Jan Magnussen. The only success of their first year came at the rain-affected Monaco Grand Prix where Barrichello finished an impressive second. Magnussen in the second car finished just outside the points in seventh after losing his front wing at the chicane. Elsewhere, the cars were consistent midfield runners, and Barrichello was often in a position to challenge for points, before misfortune struck. Stewart's reliability was poor, as the Ford Zetec-R V10 engine installed in the SF01 chassis proved to be powerful, yet extremely fragile. This restricted the team to just eight classified finishes out of a possible thirty-four. Stewart finished the season in ninth place in the constructors' championship with six points, ahead of other established teams like Tyrrell and Minardi.

=== 1998 ===
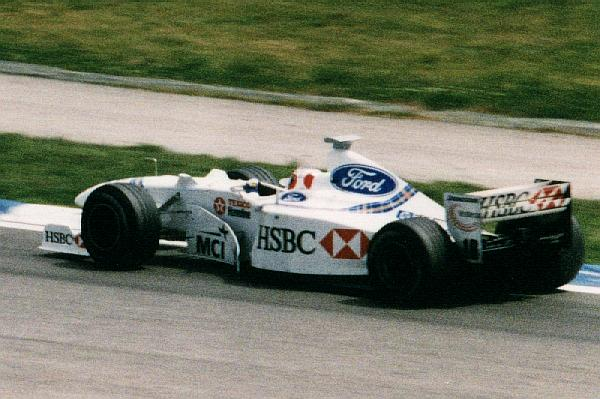
Rubens Barrichello at the 1998 Spanish Grand Prix, where he went on to score the team's first points finish of the season.

For the next year, the team developed the Stewart SF02, hoping to improve results and score regular points as well as some more podiums. However it turned out that 1998 was also a struggle for the team, with neither driver able to step onto the podium. Indeed, even points were hard to come by, as the car proved to be underdeveloped and thus uncompetitive. The first points finish came at the hands of Barrichello in Spain where he finished fifth, fending off a charging Jacques Villeneuve. The only highlight of the season came two rounds later with a double points finish in Canada where Barrichello and Magnussen finished fifth and sixth respectively. The car's reliability was still poor, but slightly improved from the previous season. After a number of poor drives, Magnussen was replaced mid season by Dutchman Jos Verstappen from the French Grand Prix onward. Ironically it was the race after Magnussen scored his first and only world championship point. Both drivers did not score any more points for the rest of the season. Despite this and scoring one point less than the year before, Stewart finished the season eighth in the constructors' championship, this time also beating Prost.

In the end the driver change did not make a great difference as Verstappen also struggled with the car. Unhappy with the team, Verstappen left Stewart at the end of the season and was replaced by Johnny Herbert for the next year. Technical director Alan Jenkins also left Stewart, and was replaced by Jordan's Gary Anderson.

=== 1999 ===
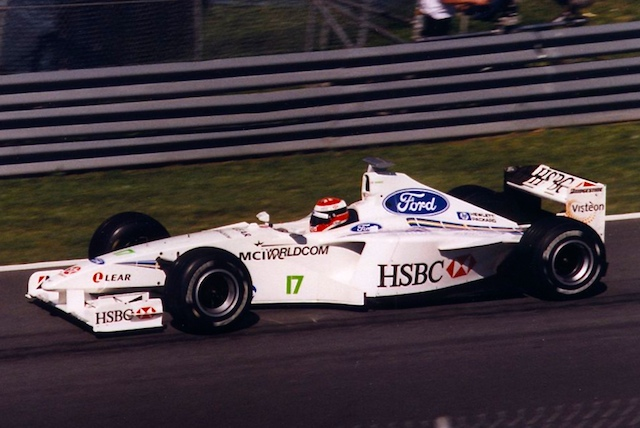
Johnny Herbert at the 1999 Canadian Grand Prix. He took his last and Stewart's first and only F1 victory later that year.

After Ford acquired Cosworth in July 1998, they risked designing and building a brand-new engine for 1999. The Stewart SF3 was quick out of the box, however both cars over-heated on the grid of the first race, the Australian Grand Prix, after qualifying competitively. This put Herbert out instantly and made Barrichello start from the pit lane. Barrichello received a stop-go penalty during the race and finished fifth. The car was consistently competitive throughout the season, however the engine initially proved fragile as both cars blew their engines at the Brazilian race which meant the engine was rarely run at full power. Stewart's competitiveness was affirmed by running first in Brazil for a long spell of the race and qualifying on pole for the French Grand Prix with Barrichello. Johnny Herbert won a popular victory at the rain soaked 1999 European Grand Prix at the new Nürburgring after other leading contenders crashed off the track or lost time in the pits changing tyres. Barrichello finished third, in a result most observers indicated that Stewart deserved given their strength over the season. Herbert also became unwittingly influential in the championship at the next and penultimate race, the Malaysian Grand Prix. Running third behind the Ferraris of Michael Schumacher and Eddie Irvine, a mistake in the closing laps allowed Mika Häkkinen to slip past and claim the final podium position which gave the championship contender vital points. The Ferraris were disqualified for car irregularities and the win allowed Häkkinen to gain his second championship. The Stewarts as a result finished second and third in the race. However Ferrari won an appeal and the initial result was reinstated. Häkkinen however went on to win the championship later in Japan and Stewart came fourth in the constructors' championship with 36 points, beating teams such as former world champions Williams and Benetton. Stewart's last race was the 1999 Japanese Grand Prix.

In 2000 Ford bought the team, renaming it Jaguar Racing. However disappointing results led to the team being sold ahead of the 2005 season, becoming Red Bull Racing from that point onward. Still operating from the same location in Milton Keynes, Red Bull Racing went on to win multiple World Constructors' Championships in the 2010s and 2020s.

== Complete Formula One results ==
(key)

Year	Chassis	Engine	Tyres	Drivers	1	2	3	4	5	6	7	8	9	10	11	12	13	14	15	16	17	Points	WCC
1997	SF01	Ford VJ Zetec-R 3.0 V10	B		AUS	BRA	ARG	SMR	MON	ESP	CAN	FRA	GBR	GER	HUN	BEL	ITA	AUT	LUX	JPN	EUR	6	9th
1997	SF01	Ford VJ Zetec-R 3.0 V10	B	(Brazil) Rubens Barrichello	Ret	Ret	Ret	Ret	2	Ret	Ret	Ret	Ret	Ret	Ret	Ret	13	14^{†}	Ret	Ret	Ret	6	9th
1997	SF01	Ford VJ Zetec-R 3.0 V10	B	(Denmark) Jan Magnussen	Ret	DNS	10^{†}	Ret	7	13	Ret	Ret	Ret	Ret	Ret	12	Ret	Ret	Ret	Ret	9	6	9th
1998	SF02	Ford VJ Zetec-R 3.0 V10	B		AUS	BRA	ARG	SMR	ESP	MON	CAN	FRA	GBR	AUT	GER	HUN	BEL	ITA	LUX	JPN		5	8th
1998	SF02	Ford VJ Zetec-R 3.0 V10	B	(Brazil) Rubens Barrichello	Ret	Ret	10	Ret	5	Ret	5	10	Ret	Ret	Ret	Ret	Ret	10	11	Ret		5	8th
1998	SF02	Ford VJ Zetec-R 3.0 V10	B	(Denmark) Jan Magnussen	Ret	10	Ret	Ret	12	Ret	6											5	8th
1998	SF02	Ford VJ Zetec-R 3.0 V10	B	(Netherlands) Jos Verstappen								12	Ret	Ret	Ret	13	Ret	Ret	13	Ret		5	8th
1999	SF3	Ford CR-1 3.0 V10	B		AUS	BRA	SMR	MON	ESP	CAN	FRA	GBR	AUT	GER	HUN	BEL	ITA	EUR	MAL	JPN		36	4th
1999	SF3	Ford CR-1 3.0 V10	B	(Brazil) Rubens Barrichello	5	Ret	3	9^{†}	DSQ	Ret	3^{P}	8	Ret	Ret	5	10	4	3	5	8		36	4th
1999	SF3	Ford CR-1 3.0 V10	B	(United Kingdom) Johnny Herbert	DNS	Ret	10^{†}	Ret	Ret	5	Ret	12	14	11^{†}	11	Ret	Ret	1	4	7		36	4th
