= 1999 Monaco Grand Prix =

Coordinates: 43°44′4.74″N 7°25′16.8″E

Race 4 of 16 in the 1999 Formula One World Championship
← Previous race	Next race →
- Circuit de Monaco (last modified in 1998)

Race details
- Date: 16 May 1999
- Official name: LVII Grand Prix Automobile de Monaco
- Location: Monte Carlo, Monaco
- Course: Temporary street circuit
- Course length: 3.367 km (2.092 miles)
- Distance: 78 laps, 262.626 km (163.188 miles)
- Weather: Sunny, hot, dry

Pole position
Driver	(Finland) Mika Häkkinen	McLaren-Mercedes
- Time: 1:20.547

Fastest lap
Driver	(Finland) Mika Häkkinen	McLaren-Mercedes
- Time: 1:22.259 on lap 67

Podium
First	(Germany) Michael Schumacher	Ferrari
Second	(United Kingdom) Eddie Irvine	Ferrari
Third	(Finland) Mika Häkkinen	McLaren-Mercedes

The 1999 Monaco Grand Prix (formally the LVII Grand Prix Automobile de Monaco) was a Formula One motor race held on 16 May 1999 at the Circuit de Monaco in Monte Carlo, Monaco. It was the fourth race of the 1999 Formula One World Championship. The 78-lap race was won by Ferrari driver Michael Schumacher after starting from second position. It was Schumacher's 16th win with Ferrari, breaking the record held by Niki Lauda. His team-mate Eddie Irvine finished second with Mika Häkkinen third for the McLaren team.

The race was Schumacher's second win of the season, his fourth at Monaco, and the result meant that he extended his lead in the Drivers' Championship, to eight points over Irvine and twelve over Häkkinen. Ferrari extended their lead in the Constructors' Championship, twenty-four points ahead of McLaren and twenty-eight ahead of Jordan with 12 races of the season remaining.

== Report ==
=== Background ===
The Grand Prix was contested by eleven teams, each of two drivers. The teams, also known as constructors, were McLaren, Ferrari, Williams, Jordan, Benetton, Sauber, Arrows, Stewart, Prost, Minardi and BAR. Tyre supplier Bridgestone brought four different tyre types to the race: two dry compounds, the extra soft and the soft, and two wet-weather compounds, the intermediate and full wet.

Going into the race, Ferrari driver Michael Schumacher led the Drivers' Championship with 16 points, ahead of Eddie Irvine on 12 points and Mika Häkkinen on 10 points. Heinz-Harald Frentzen was fourth with 10 points while Ralf Schumacher was fifth on 10 points. In the Constructors' Championship Ferrari were leading with 28 points, McLaren and Jordan were second and third with 16 and 13 points respectively, while Williams with 7 and Stewart with 6 points contended for fourth place. Ferrari had so far dominated the championship, winning two out of the three previous races, with Häkkinen winning the Brazilian Grand Prix. Championship contenders Frentzen and David Coulthard had each gained one second-place finish, and Ralf Schumacher and Rubens Barrichello had achieved third place podium finishes.

Following the San Marino Grand Prix on 2 May, several teams conducted testing sessions at circuits around the world. Ferrari and Minardi headed for Fiorano where testing for the set-up around the Monaco circuit took place. McLaren and Prost tested at the Circuit de Nevers Magny-Cours running over the course of three days, while Prost elected to test for one day. Jordan tested at the Lurcy-Lévis test track with driver Andrew Gilbert-Scott performing aerodynamic mapping runs.

=== Practice and qualifying ===
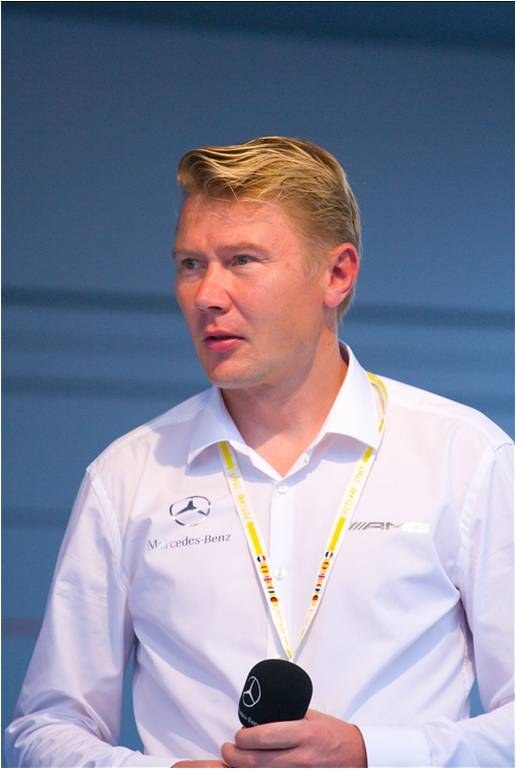
Häkkinen achieved his fourth pole position in four races, and the 14th in his career.

Four practice sessions were held before the race; two one-hour sessions on Thursday and two 45 minutes sessions on Saturday. The Friday sessions were held in dry and cloudy conditions. Irvine was the fastest driver in the first session, with a time of 1:18.910 that was less than six-tenths of a second faster than Michael Schumacher. Jordan driver Damon Hill was less than two-tenths of a second off Michael Schumacher's pace, with Barrichello, Alessandro Zanardi and Jean Alesi rounding out the top six. In the second practice session, Michael Schumacher was fastest with a time of 1:22.718, ahead of Häkkinen, Olivier Panis, Irvine, Giancarlo Fisichella and Coulthard.

Saturday's afternoon qualifying session lasted for an hour. During this session, the 107% rule was in effect, which necessitated each driver set a time within 107% of the quickest lap to qualify for the race. Each driver was limited to twelve laps. Häkkinen achieved his fourth pole position of the season, his second at the Circuit de Monaco, with a time of 1:20.547. He was joined on the front row of the grid by Michael Schumacher, who was less than one-tenth of a second behind.

=== Race ===
The conditions for the race were dry with the air temperature 19 °C (66 °F) and the track temperature 34 °C (93 °F). The drivers took to the track at 09:30 (GMT +1) for a 30-minute warm-up session. Both Ferrari drivers maintained their good pace from qualifying; Michael Schumacher set the fastest time, a 1:23.792. Irvine was second in the other Ferrari car. Both McLaren drivers were just off Irvine's pace—Häkkinen ahead of Coulthard—while Hill and Ralf Schumacher rounded out the top six.

Both Ferraris gained a position at the start, with Michael Schumacher taking the lead from Mika Häkkinen, Eddie Irvine and David Coulthard. The order remained this way until lap 35 when Coulthard's car began to slow, eventually causing him to retire. Further bad luck befell McLaren a few laps later when Häkkinen went straight on at Mirabeau from oil left after Toranosuke Takagi's blown engine. Eddie Irvine moved into 2nd place and stayed there.

On the podium, the Republic of Ireland's flag was flown for Irvine.

=== Post-race ===
The race result left Michael Schumacher extending his lead in the Drivers' Championship with 26 points. Irvine's second place ensured that he maintained second position in the Championship with 18 points, four points ahead of Häkkinen and five ahead of Frentzen. In the Constructors' Championship, Ferrari extended their lead to 44 points, McLaren maintained second with 20 points, with Jordan maintaining third with 16 points, with 12 races of the season remaining.

== Classification ==
=== Qualifying ===
Pos	No	Driver	Constructor	Time	Gap
1	1	(Finland) Mika Häkkinen	McLaren-Mercedes	1:20.547	
2	3	(Germany) Michael Schumacher	Ferrari	1:20.611	+0.064
3	2	(United Kingdom) David Coulthard	McLaren-Mercedes	1:20.956	+0.409
4	4	(United Kingdom) Eddie Irvine	Ferrari	1:21.011	+0.464
5	16	(Brazil) Rubens Barrichello	Stewart-Ford	1:21.530	+0.983
6	8	(Germany) Heinz-Harald Frentzen	Jordan-Mugen-Honda	1:21.556	+1.009
7	19	(Italy) Jarno Trulli	Prost-Peugeot	1:21.769	+1.222
8	22	(Canada) Jacques Villeneuve	BAR-Supertec	1:21.827	+1.280
9	9	(Italy) Giancarlo Fisichella	Benetton-Playlife	1:21.938	+1.391
10	10	(Austria) Alexander Wurz	Benetton-Playlife	1:21.968	+1.421
11	5	(Italy) Alessandro Zanardi	Williams-Supertec	1:22.152	+1.605
12	23	(Finland) Mika Salo	BAR-Supertec	1:22.241	+1.694
13	17	(United Kingdom) Johnny Herbert	Stewart-Ford	1:22.248	+1.701
14	11	(France) Jean Alesi	Sauber-Petronas	1:22.354	+1.807
15	12	(Brazil) Pedro Diniz	Sauber-Petronas	1:22.659	+2.112
16	6	(Germany) Ralf Schumacher	Williams-Supertec	1:22.719	+2.172
17	7	(United Kingdom) Damon Hill	Jordan-Mugen-Honda	1:22.832	+2.285
18	18	(France) Olivier Panis	Prost-Peugeot	1:22.916	+2.369
19	15	(Japan) Toranosuke Takagi	Arrows	1:23.290	+2.743
20	20	(Italy) Luca Badoer	Minardi-Ford	1:23.765	+3.218
21	14	(Spain) Pedro de la Rosa	Arrows	1:24.260	+3.713
22	21	(Spain) Marc Gené	Minardi-Ford	1:24.914	+4.367
107% time: 1:26.185

=== Race ===
Pos	No	Driver	Constructor	Laps	Time/Retired	Grid	Points
1	3	(Germany) Michael Schumacher	Ferrari	78	1:49:31.812	2	10
2	4	(United Kingdom) Eddie Irvine	Ferrari	78	+30.476	4	6
3	1	(Finland) Mika Häkkinen	McLaren-Mercedes	78	+37.483	1	4
4	8	(Germany) Heinz-Harald Frentzen	Jordan-Mugen-Honda	78	+54.009	6	3
5	9	(Italy) Giancarlo Fisichella	Benetton-Playlife	77	+1 lap	9	2
6	10	(Austria) Alexander Wurz	Benetton-Playlife	77	+1 lap	10	1
7	19	(Italy) Jarno Trulli	Prost-Peugeot	77	+1 lap	7	
8	5	(Italy) Alessandro Zanardi	Williams-Supertec	76	+2 laps	11	
9	16	(Brazil) Rubens Barrichello	Stewart-Ford	71	Suspension/spun off	5	
Ret	6	(Germany) Ralf Schumacher	Williams-Supertec	54	Accident	16	
Ret	11	(France) Jean Alesi	Sauber-Petronas	50	Suspension	14	
Ret	12	(Brazil) Pedro Diniz	Sauber-Petronas	49	Suspension	15	
Ret	18	(France) Olivier Panis	Prost-Peugeot	40	Engine	18	
Ret	2	(United Kingdom) David Coulthard	McLaren-Mercedes	36	Gearbox	3	
Ret	23	(Finland) Mika Salo	BAR-Supertec	36	Brakes/accident	12	
Ret	15	(Japan) Toranosuke Takagi	Arrows	36	Engine	19	
Ret	22	(Canada) Jacques Villeneuve	BAR-Supertec	32	Oil leak	8	
Ret	17	(United Kingdom) Johnny Herbert	Stewart-Ford	32	Suspension	13	
Ret	14	(Spain) Pedro de la Rosa	Arrows	30	Gearbox	21	
Ret	21	(Spain) Marc Gené	Minardi-Ford	24	Accident	22	
Ret	20	(Italy) Luca Badoer	Minardi-Ford	10	Gearbox	20	
Ret	7	(United Kingdom) Damon Hill	Jordan-Mugen-Honda	3	Collision	17	

== Championship standings after the race ==
Drivers' Championship standings

Pos	Driver	Points
1	(Germany) Michael Schumacher	26
2	(United Kingdom) Eddie Irvine	18
3	(Finland) Mika Häkkinen	14
4	(Germany) Heinz-Harald Frentzen	13
5	(Germany) Ralf Schumacher	7

Constructors' Championship standings

Pos	Constructor	Points
1	(Italy) Ferrari	44
2	(United Kingdom) McLaren-Mercedes	20
3	(Republic of Ireland) Jordan-Mugen-Honda	16
4	(Italy) Benetton-Playlife	8
5	(United Kingdom) Williams-Supertec	7

- Note: Only the top five positions are included for both sets of standings.

Previous race: 1999 San Marino Grand Prix	FIA Formula One World Championship; 1999 season	Next race: 1999 Spanish Grand Prix
Previous race: 1998 Monaco Grand Prix	Monaco Grand Prix	Next race: 2000 Monaco Grand Prix
