= 1999 Belgian Grand Prix =

Race 12 of 16 in the 1999 Formula One World Championship
← Previous race	Next race →
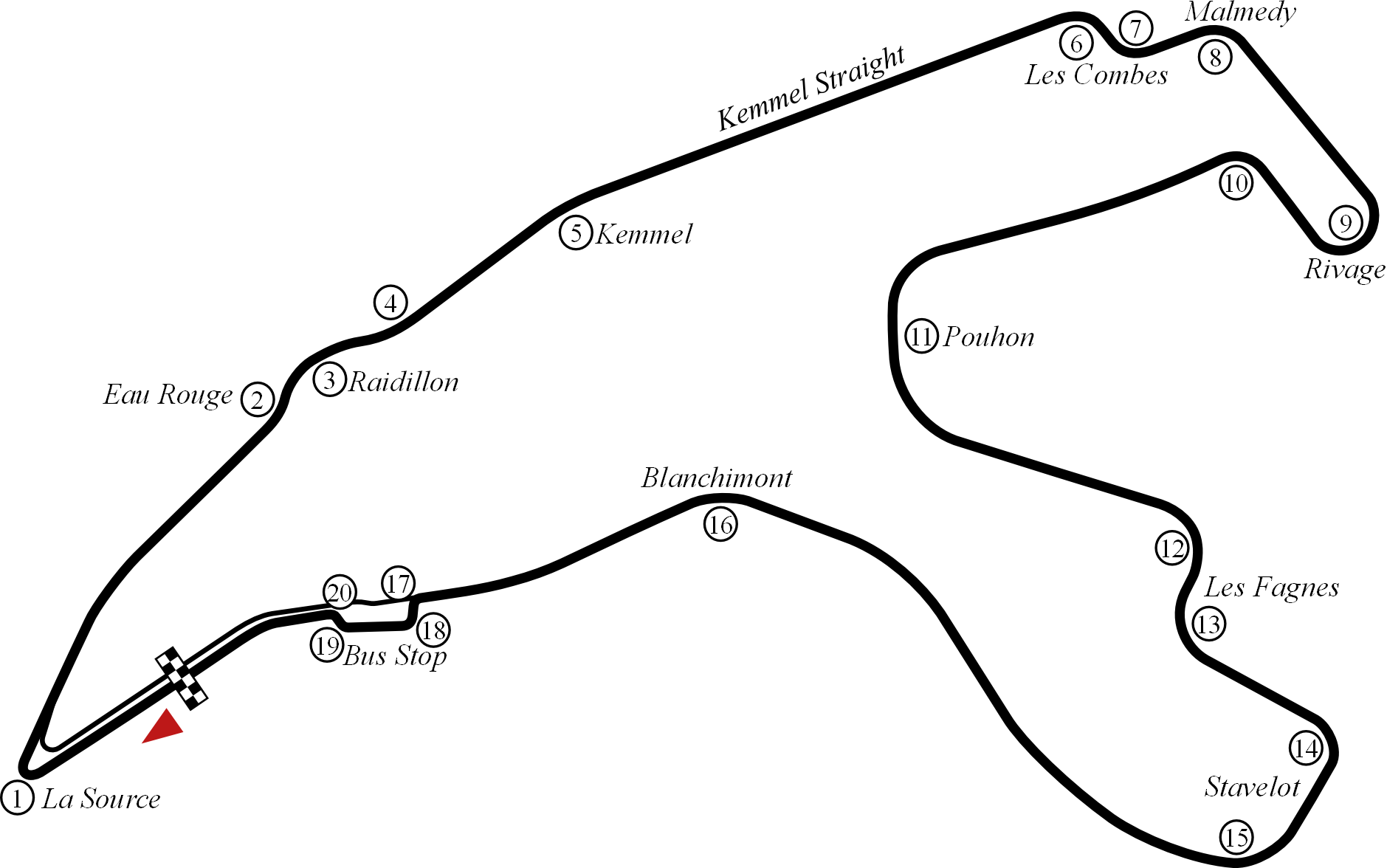
- Circuit de Spa-Francorchamps (last modified in 1996)

Race details
- Date: 29 August 1999
- Official name: LVII Foster's Belgian Grand Prix
- Location: Circuit de Spa-Francorchamps; Francorchamps, Wallonia, Belgium
- Course: Permanent racing facility
- Course length: 6.968 km (4.330 miles)
- Distance: 44 laps, 306.592 km (190.507 miles)
- Weather: Partially cloudy, mild, dry

Pole position
Driver	(Finland) Mika Häkkinen	McLaren-Mercedes
- Time: 1:50.329

Fastest lap
Driver	(Finland) Mika Häkkinen	McLaren-Mercedes
- Time: 1:53.955 on lap 23

Podium
First	(United Kingdom) David Coulthard	McLaren-Mercedes
Second	(Finland) Mika Häkkinen	McLaren-Mercedes
Third	(Germany) Heinz-Harald Frentzen	Jordan-Mugen-Honda

The 1999 Belgian Grand Prix (formally the LVII Foster's Belgian Grand Prix) was a Formula One motor race held on 29 August 1999 at the Circuit de Spa-Francorchamps in Francorchamps, Belgium. It was the twelfth race of the 1999 Formula One World Championship.

The 44-lap race was won by British driver David Coulthard, driving a McLaren-Mercedes, after he started from second position. Finn Mika Häkkinen took pole position in the other McLaren-Mercedes, but Coulthard overtook him at the first corner and went on to lead all 44 laps. Häkkinen finished second, some 10 seconds behind, with German Heinz-Harald Frentzen third in a Jordan-Mugen-Honda.

Häkkinen took back the lead of the Drivers' Championship by one point from Eddie Irvine, who finished fourth in his Ferrari, while McLaren moved into the lead of the Constructors' Championship, nine points ahead of Ferrari.

Former world Champion Damon Hill scored his last points at this race.

== Report ==
=== Background ===
The Grand Prix was contested by 22 drivers, in eleven teams of two. The teams, also known as Constructors, were McLaren, Ferrari, Williams, Jordan, Benetton, Sauber, Arrows, Stewart, Prost, Minardi and BAR.

Before the race, Ferrari driver Eddie Irvine was leading the Drivers' Championship on 56 points; McLaren driver Mika Häkkinen was second on 54 points. Behind them in the Drivers' Championship, David Coulthard was third on 36 points in the other McLaren, with Heinz-Harald Frentzen and Michael Schumacher on 36 and 32 points respectively. In the Constructors' Championship, Ferrari were leading on 94 points and McLaren were second on 90 points, with Jordan third on 42 points.

Following the Hungarian Grand Prix on 15 August, the teams conducted testing sessions at the Silverstone circuit on 17–19 August. Häkkinen set the fastest time on the first, second and final days of testing. Ferrari traveled to their testing circuit at Mugello on 18–20 August, running Schumacher on the final day after being cleared by doctors to test. After completing 20 laps, Schumacher suffered from ankle pain preventing him completing a physical training programme. Ferrari later announced that temporary replacement Mika Salo would continue to race for the team.

Several teams announced changes to their driver line-ups for the following season. Benetton confirmed that the team was retaining their driver line-up of Giancarlo Fisichella and Alexander Wurz, with an option for 2001. Sauber announced that it would sign up Salo on a two-year contract and retain Pedro Diniz. Jordan confirmed that it was signing Prost driver Jarno Trulli on a two-year contract, replacing Damon Hill.

=== Practice and qualifying ===
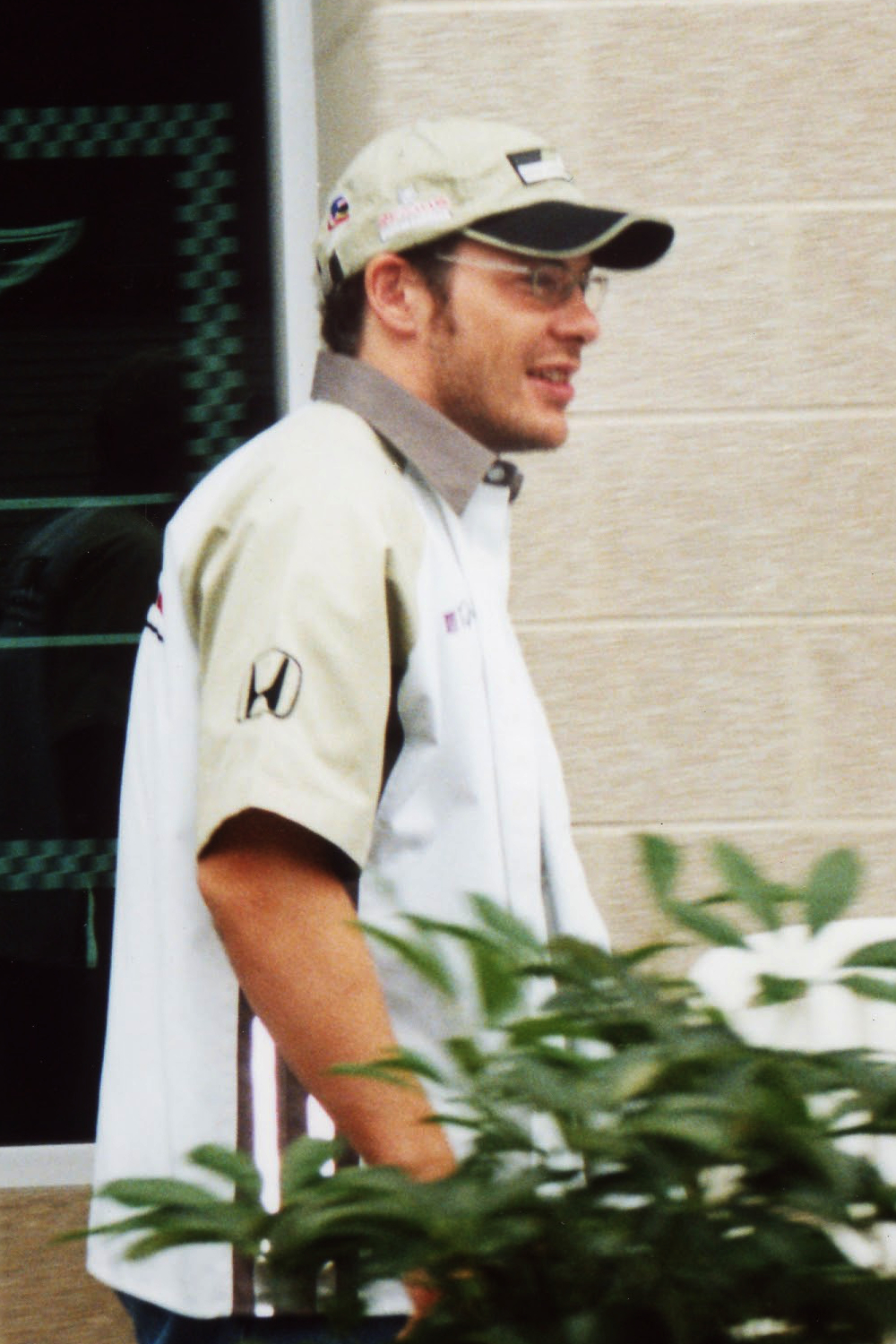
Jacques Villeneuve (pictured in 2002) suffered a heavy crash during Saturday afternoon's qualifying session.

Four practice sessions were held before the Sunday race—two on Friday, and two on Saturday. The Friday morning and afternoon sessions each lasted an hour. The third and final practice sessions were held on Saturday morning and lasted 45 minutes. The Friday sessions were held in dry and sunny conditions. Häkkinen was quickest in the first session, with a time of 1:54.396 that was less than half a second faster than Coulthard. Williams driver Ralf Schumacher was just off Coulthard's pace; Salo, Irvine and Jean Alesi rounded out the top six; within 1.3 seconds of Häkkinen's time. In the second practice session, Coulthard was fastest with a time of 1:53.577, ahead of Häkkinen, Fisichella, Frentzen, Hill and Schumacher.

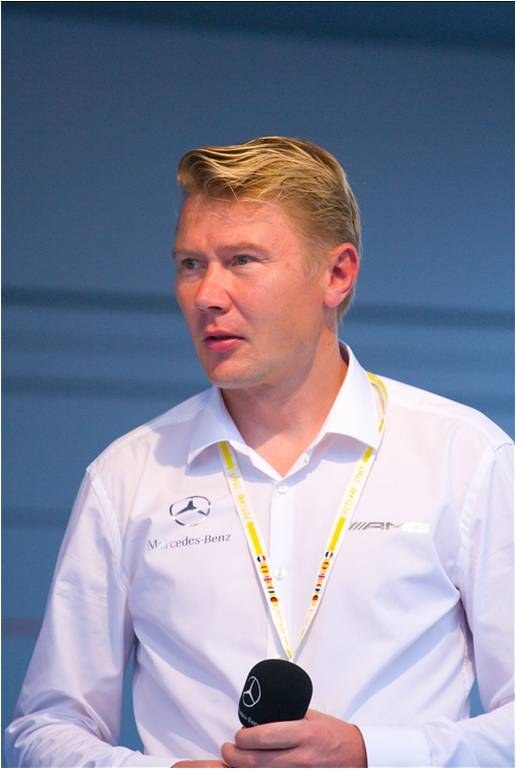
Mika Häkkinen (pictured in 2009) took his tenth pole position of the season.

Saturday's afternoon qualifying session lasted for an hour. During this session, the 107% rule was in effect, which necessitated each driver set a time within 107% of the quickest lap to qualify for the race. Each driver was limited to twelve laps. Häkkinen clinched his tenth pole position of the season with a time of 1:50.329. He was joined on the front row by Coulthard, who was one-tenth of a second behind. Frentzen qualified third, though be believed he could have gone faster due to two separate red flag incidents.

BAR drivers Jacques Villeneuve and Ricardo Zonta both suffered massive, high-speed accidents at the fast Eau Rouge sweep during the qualifying session. Both accidents caused the session to be suspended.

=== Race ===
The conditions were dry for the race with the air temperature 20 °C (68 °F) and the track temperature 25 °C (77 °F). The drivers took to the track at 09:30 (UTC +2) for a 30-minute warm-up session.

Coulthard took the lead from Häkkinen at the start by going around the outside of La Source, the McLaren team-mates making light contact. After emerging ahead, Coulthard led every lap of the race to claim his second victory of the season, ten seconds ahead of his team-mate. Häkkinen refused to shake Coulthard's hand after the race.

Heinz-Harald Frentzen finished third, with the rest of the top six completed by Eddie Irvine, Ralf Schumacher and Damon Hill. This would prove to be Hill's final points scoring finish in Formula 1. Jacques Villeneuve managed to see the chequered flag for the first time of the season.

== Classification ==
=== Qualifying ===
Pos	No	Driver	Constructor	Lap	Gap
1	1	(Finland) Mika Häkkinen	McLaren-Mercedes	1:50.329	
2	2	(United Kingdom) David Coulthard	McLaren-Mercedes	1:50.484	+0.155
3	8	(Germany) Heinz-Harald Frentzen	Jordan-Mugen-Honda	1:51.332	+1.003
4	7	(United Kingdom) Damon Hill	Jordan-Mugen-Honda	1:51.372	+1.043
5	6	(Germany) Ralf Schumacher	Williams-Supertec	1:51.414	+1.085
6	4	(United Kingdom) Eddie Irvine	Ferrari	1:51.895	+1.566
7	16	(Brazil) Rubens Barrichello	Stewart-Ford	1:51.974	+1.645
8	5	(Italy) Alessandro Zanardi	Williams-Supertec	1:52.014	+1.685
9	3	(Finland) Mika Salo	Ferrari	1:52.124	+1.795
10	17	(United Kingdom) Johnny Herbert	Stewart-Ford	1:52.164	+1.835
11	22	(Canada) Jacques Villeneuve	BAR-Supertec	1:52.235	+1.906
12	19	(Italy) Jarno Trulli	Prost-Peugeot	1:52.644	+2.315
13	9	(Italy) Giancarlo Fisichella	Benetton-Playlife	1:52.762	+2.433
14	23	(Brazil) Ricardo Zonta	BAR-Supertec	1:52.840	+2.511
15	10	(Austria) Alexander Wurz	Benetton-Playlife	1:52.847	+2.518
16	11	(France) Jean Alesi	Sauber-Petronas	1:52.921	+2.592
17	18	(France) Olivier Panis	Prost-Peugeot	1:53.148	+2.819
18	12	(Brazil) Pedro Diniz	Sauber-Petronas	1:53.778	+3.449
19	15	(Japan) Toranosuke Takagi	Arrows	1:54.099	+3.770
20	20	(Italy) Luca Badoer	Minardi-Ford	1:54.197	+3.868
21	21	(Spain) Marc Gené	Minardi-Ford	1:54.557	+4.228
22	14	(Spain) Pedro de la Rosa	Arrows	1:54.579	+4.250
107% time: 1:58.052

=== Race ===
Pos	No	Driver	Constructor	Laps	Time/Retired	Grid	Points
1	2	(United Kingdom) David Coulthard	McLaren-Mercedes	44	1:25:43.057	2	10
2	1	(Finland) Mika Häkkinen	McLaren-Mercedes	44	+ 10.469	1	6
3	8	(Germany) Heinz-Harald Frentzen	Jordan-Mugen-Honda	44	+ 33.433	3	4
4	4	(United Kingdom) Eddie Irvine	Ferrari	44	+ 44.948	6	3
5	6	(Germany) Ralf Schumacher	Williams-Supertec	44	+ 48.067	5	2
6	7	(United Kingdom) Damon Hill	Jordan-Mugen-Honda	44	+ 54.916	4	1
7	3	(Finland) Mika Salo	Ferrari	44	+ 56.249	9	
8	5	(Italy) Alessandro Zanardi	Williams-Supertec	44	+ 1:07.022	8	
9	11	(France) Jean Alesi	Sauber-Petronas	44	+ 1:13.848	16	
10	16	(Brazil) Rubens Barrichello	Stewart-Ford	44	+ 1:20.742	7	
11	9	(Italy) Giancarlo Fisichella	Benetton-Playlife	44	+ 1:32.195	13	
12	19	(Italy) Jarno Trulli	Prost-Peugeot	44	+ 1:36.154	12	
13	18	(France) Olivier Panis	Prost-Peugeot	44	+ 1:41.543	17	
14	10	(Austria) Alexander Wurz	Benetton-Playlife	44	+ 1:57.745	15	
15	22	(Canada) Jacques Villeneuve	BAR-Supertec	43	+ 1 lap	11	
16	21	(Spain) Marc Gené	Minardi-Ford	43	+ 1 lap	21	
Ret	14	(Spain) Pedro de la Rosa	Arrows	35	Transmission	22	
Ret	20	(Italy) Luca Badoer	Minardi-Ford	33	Suspension	20	
Ret	23	(Brazil) Ricardo Zonta	BAR-Supertec	33	Gearbox	14	
Ret	17	(United Kingdom) Johnny Herbert	Stewart-Ford	27	Brakes	10	
Ret	12	(Brazil) Pedro Diniz	Sauber-Petronas	19	Spun off	18	
Ret	15	(Japan) Toranosuke Takagi	Arrows	0	Clutch	19	

== Championship standings after the race ==
Drivers' Championship standings

Pos	Driver	Points
1	(Finland) Mika Häkkinen	60
2	(United Kingdom) Eddie Irvine	59
3	(United Kingdom) David Coulthard	46
4	(Germany) Heinz-Harald Frentzen	40
5	(Germany) Michael Schumacher	32

Constructors' Championship standings

Pos	Constructor	Points
1	(United Kingdom) McLaren-Mercedes	106
2	(Italy) Ferrari	97
3	(Republic of Ireland) Jordan-Mugen-Honda	47
4	(United Kingdom) Williams-Supertec	24
5	(Italy) Benetton-Playlife	16

- Note: Only the top five positions are included for both sets of standings.

Previous race: 1999 Hungarian Grand Prix	FIA Formula One World Championship; 1999 season	Next race: 1999 Italian Grand Prix
Previous race: 1998 Belgian Grand Prix	Belgian Grand Prix	Next race: 2000 Belgian Grand Prix
