= 1999 Canadian Grand Prix =

Race 6 of 16 in the 1999 Formula One World Championship
← Previous race	Next race →
- Circuit Gilles Villeneuve (last modified in 1996)

Race details
- Date: 13 June 1999
- Official name: XXXVII Grand Prix Air Canada
- Location: Montreal, Quebec, Canada
- Course: Temporary street circuit
- Course length: 4.421 km (2.747 miles)
- Distance: 69 laps, 305.049 km (189.549 miles)
- Weather: Hot with temperatures approaching 31.0 °C (87.8 °F); Wind speeds up to 5.1 km/h (3.2 mph); Track 41–43 °C (106–109 °F)

Pole position
Driver	(Germany) Michael Schumacher	Ferrari
- Time: 1:19.298

Fastest lap
Driver	(United Kingdom) Eddie Irvine	Ferrari
- Time: 1:20.382 on lap 62

Podium
First	(Finland) Mika Häkkinen	McLaren-Mercedes
Second	(Italy) Giancarlo Fisichella	Benetton-Playlife
Third	(United Kingdom) Eddie Irvine	Ferrari

The 1999 Canadian Grand Prix was a Formula One motor race held on 13 June 1999 at the Circuit Gilles Villeneuve in Montreal, Quebec, Canada. It was the sixth race of the 1999 Formula One season.

The race was notable for the four crashes that occurred in turn 13 and for the number of times the safety car was deployed. Turn 13, the final chicane, had four separate crashes in which a driver either went wide or spun into the wall. Three of the drivers who crashed there had previously won the Drivers' Championship, leading to the wall becoming known as the "Wall of Champions". The safety car was deployed four times in the race, a record at the time, and was the first Formula One race to finish behind the safety car following Heinz-Harald Frentzen's crash with four laps to go.

== Report ==
=== Qualifying ===
Michael Schumacher started on pole for the first time in 1999, ahead of Mika Häkkinen and Eddie Irvine.

=== Race ===
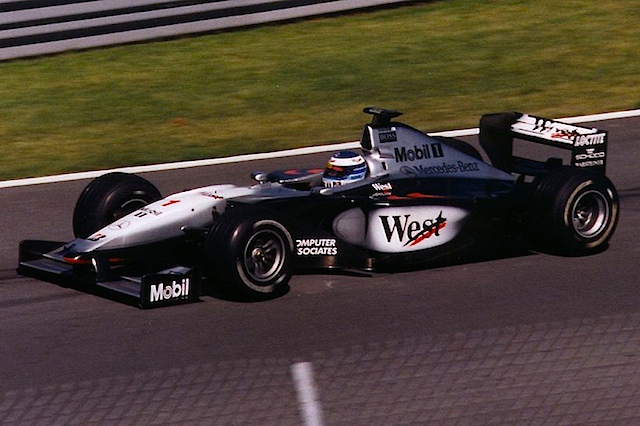
The race was won by Mika Häkkinen for McLaren.

The front runners got off the line cleanly, with Michael Schumacher maintaining first place, Häkkinen second, and Irvine third. Behind them Giancarlo Fisichella passed David Coulthard to take fifth place. Jarno Trulli, starting ninth, went off the track trying to pass Heinz-Harald Frentzen up the inside into turn one. Trulli spun across turn one, collecting Jean Alesi and Rubens Barrichello in the process. Trulli and Alesi retired, and the safety car was deployed. Alexander Wurz also retired during the first lap with transmission problems. Barrichello limped back to the pits where repairs were made to his car. He was able to resume the race, albeit two laps down on the leader, but ultimately had to retire because of the collision damage after having completed 14 laps.

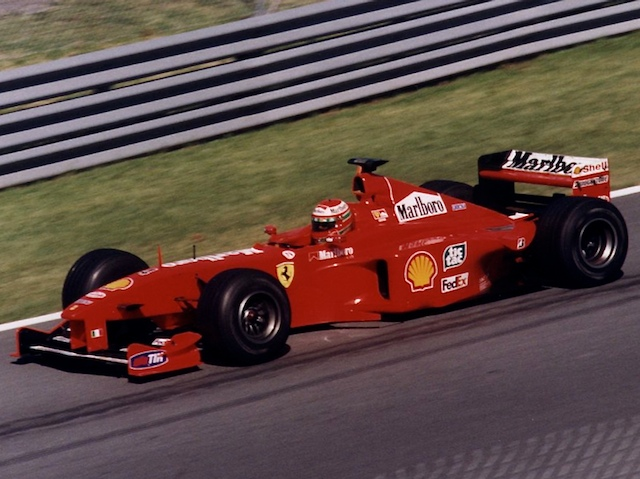
Eddie Irvine posted his only career fastest lap in this race.

The safety car returned to the pits at the end of the second lap, having been deployed for only one lap, allowing normal racing to resume with the top six being Michael Schumacher, Häkkinen, Irvine, Fisichella, Coulthard and Frentzen.

During the third lap Coulthard passed Fisichella going into turn 13 to retake fourth place. Later that same lap, Ricardo Zonta retired after spinning into the wall at that same turn 13. He stopped just off the track, missing his right rear wheel. This brought the safety car out again. Zonta was the first of four drivers to hit the "Wall of Champions" in this race.

At the end of lap 7 the safety car left the track again, allowing the race to resume normally again. The order remained stable until on lap 15, Damon Hill became the second driver to hit the turn 13 wall. He was able to pull off the track in a safe location, and the safety car was not deployed.

During lap 24, Pedro de la Rosa came in to the pits for a scheduled stop, but when trying to leave his gearbox failed. This forced him to retire. One lap later Stewart's Johnny Herbert, from seventh position, was the first driver running in the top ten to make a scheduled pit stop. He returned to the track in tenth place.

Michael Schumacher hit the wall at turn 13 on lap 30, giving the lead to Mika Häkkinen. Five laps later, Jacques Villeneuve became the fourth and final driver on the day to hit the wall at that turn, bringing the safety car out for the third time. Hill, Schumacher, and Villeneuve were three of the four Formula 1 Drivers' Champions competing in the race who hit the wall.

The third safety car period, occurring around the halfway point of the race, was used by many drivers to make a scheduled pitstop. Fisichella, Frentzen, Pedro Diniz, Ralf Schumacher, Herbert, Häkkinen, and Irvine all came into the pits shortly before or after the safety car having been deployed to the circuit.

Near the end of lap 38, David Coulthard passed the safety car before entering the pit lane for his scheduled stop. Shortly afterwards Alessandro Zanardi did the same after coming out of the pit lane following his stop trying to prevent being lapped. Both Coulthard and Zanardi also ignored a red light at the end of the pit lane when exiting following their pit stop.

Following the series of pit stops, the top six behind the safety car was Häkkinen, Irvine, Coulthard, Fisichella, Heinz-Harald Frentzen and Ralf Schumacher. Normal racing restarted again on lap 41. Coulthard tried to go around the outside of Eddie Irvine into turn one, then the inside on turn two. However they touched, and both spun off. Both were able to rejoin, though Coulthard had to pit at the end of the lap. This dropped them to 8th and 10th place respectively while Fisichella and Frentzen took over third and fourth place with Ralf Schumacher and Diniz following in fifth and sixth.

Two laps later Fisichella and Frentzen found themselves trying to lap Luca Badoer and Olivier Panis. However Panis attempted to pass Badoer while approaching turn 13, thus ignoring blue flags being shown to them. Panis was unable to pass before the turn and being on the outside going into it had to yield. This meant he went rather slowly through the turn, forcing Fisichella behind wide which in turn allowed Frentzen to move into third place. On the same lap, Toranosuke Takagi, already two laps from the lead, slowly entered the pit lane to retire his Arrows with transmission problems.

During lap 47 Coulthard, Zanardi, Badoer and Panis were all issued 10 second stop and go penalties. Coulthard and Zanardi for ignoring the red light in the pit lane following their pitstops, Badoer and Panis for ignoring blue flags. The latter three served their penalties on the same lap, while Coulthard followed suit one lap later.

Meanwhile, Irvine continued to move back up the order following the incident with Coulthard. By lap 46 he had moved into seventh place. At the start of lap 47 he passed Diniz for sixth place going into turn one. Six laps later he passed Herbert for fifth place going into turn 13, though both drivers had to cut across the grass. Another five lap later he passed Ralf Schumacher on the same spot to take fourth place. In the meantime, on lap 51, Zanardi retired with brake problems.

The fourth and final safety car of the race came out on lap 66 after Heinz-Harald Frentzen, running in second place, suffered a brake failure whilst approaching turn three and he crashed into the barriers sideways. He was uninjured. The safety car came out at the start of the next lap, with the race finishing under safety car conditions, a first for Formula One, with Mika Häkkinen victorious. Eddie Irvine scored his first fastest lap and finished third behind Giancarlo Fisichella.

== Classification ==
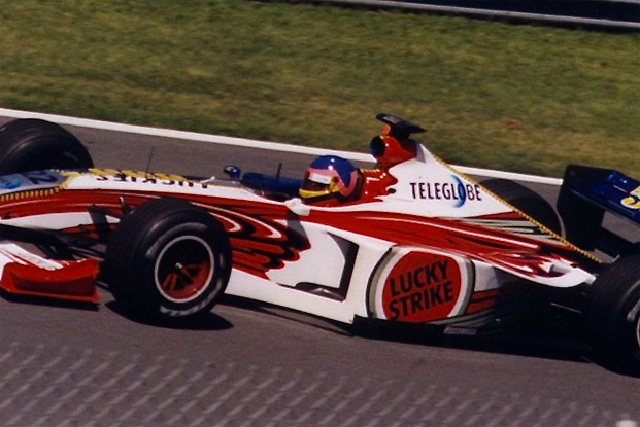
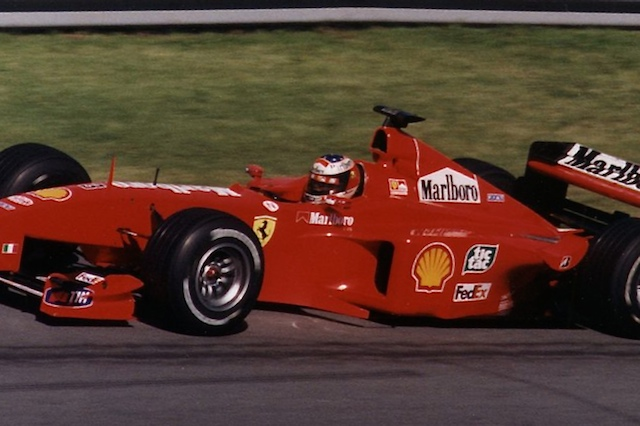

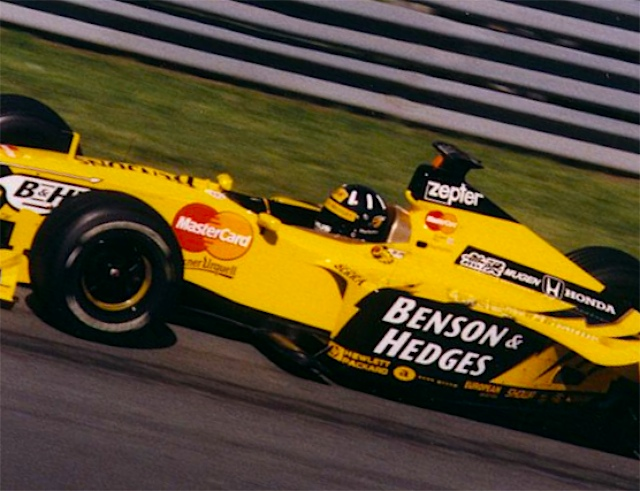
Jacques Villeneuve (BAR) (top), Michael Schumacher (Ferrari) (center), and Damon Hill (Jordan) (bottom) all became victims of the outside wall at the exit of the final chicane. Because all three of them were former World Champions, their collisions with that wall, which all happened on separate occasions, resulted in it being nicknamed the "Wall of Champions".

=== Qualifying ===
Pos	No	Driver	Constructor	Lap	Gap
1	3	(Germany) Michael Schumacher	Ferrari	1:19.298	
2	1	(Finland) Mika Häkkinen	McLaren-Mercedes	1:19.327	+0.029
3	4	(United Kingdom) Eddie Irvine	Ferrari	1:19.440	+0.142
4	2	(United Kingdom) David Coulthard	McLaren-Mercedes	1:19.729	+0.431
5	16	(Brazil) Rubens Barrichello	Stewart-Ford	1:19.930	+0.632
6	8	(Germany) Heinz-Harald Frentzen	Jordan-Mugen-Honda	1:20.158	+0.860
7	9	(Italy) Giancarlo Fisichella	Benetton-Playlife	1:20.378	+1.080
8	11	(France) Jean Alesi	Sauber-Petronas	1:20.459	+1.161
9	19	(Italy) Jarno Trulli	Prost-Peugeot	1:20.557	+1.259
10	17	(United Kingdom) Johnny Herbert	Stewart-Ford	1:20.829	+1.531
11	10	(Austria) Alexander Wurz	Benetton-Playlife	1:21.000	+1.702
12	5	(Italy) Alessandro Zanardi	Williams-Supertec	1:21.076	+1.778
13	6	(Germany) Ralf Schumacher	Williams-Supertec	1:21.081	+1.783
14	7	(United Kingdom) Damon Hill	Jordan-Mugen-Honda	1:21.094	+1.796
15	18	(France) Olivier Panis	Prost-Peugeot	1:21.252	+1.954
16	22	(Canada) Jacques Villeneuve	BAR-Supertec	1:21.302	+2.004
17	23	(Brazil) Ricardo Zonta	BAR-Supertec	1:21.467	+2.169
18	12	(Brazil) Pedro Diniz	Sauber-Petronas	1:21.571	+2.273
19	15	(Japan) Toranosuke Takagi	Arrows	1:21.693	+2.395
20	14	(Spain) Pedro de la Rosa	Arrows	1:22.613	+3.315
21	20	(Italy) Luca Badoer	Minardi-Ford	1:22.808	+3.510
22	21	(Spain) Marc Gené	Minardi-Ford	1:23.387	+4.089
107% time: 1:24.849

=== Race ===
Pos	No	Driver	Constructor	Laps	Time/Retired	Grid	Points
1	1	(Finland) Mika Häkkinen	McLaren-Mercedes	69	1:41:35.727	2	10
2	9	(Italy) Giancarlo Fisichella	Benetton-Playlife	69	+0.782	7	6
3	4	(United Kingdom) Eddie Irvine	Ferrari	69	+1.797	3	4
4	6	(Germany) Ralf Schumacher	Williams-Supertec	69	+2.392	13	3
5	17	(United Kingdom) Johnny Herbert	Stewart-Ford	69	+2.805	10	2
6	12	(Brazil) Pedro Diniz	Sauber-Petronas	69	+3.711	18	1
7	2	(United Kingdom) David Coulthard	McLaren-Mercedes	69	+5.004	4	
8	21	(Spain) Marc Gené	Minardi-Ford	68	+1 Lap	22	
9	18	(France) Olivier Panis	Prost-Peugeot	68	+1 Lap	15	
10	20	(Italy) Luca Badoer	Minardi-Ford	67	+2 Laps	21	
11	8	(Germany) Heinz-Harald Frentzen	Jordan-Mugen-Honda	65	Brakes/accident	6	
Ret	5	(Italy) Alessandro Zanardi	Williams-Supertec	50	Brakes	12	
Ret	15	(Japan) Toranosuke Takagi	Arrows	41	Transmission	19	
Ret	22	(Canada) Jacques Villeneuve	BAR-Supertec	34	Accident	16	
Ret	3	(Germany) Michael Schumacher	Ferrari	29	Accident	1	
Ret	14	(Spain) Pedro de la Rosa	Arrows	22	Transmission	20	
Ret	7	(United Kingdom) Damon Hill	Jordan-Mugen-Honda	14	Accident	14	
Ret	16	(Brazil) Rubens Barrichello	Stewart-Ford	14	Collision damage	5	
Ret	23	(Brazil) Ricardo Zonta	BAR-Supertec	2	Spun off	17	
Ret	11	(France) Jean Alesi	Sauber-Petronas	0	Collision	8	
Ret	19	(Italy) Jarno Trulli	Prost-Peugeot	0	Collision	9	
Ret	10	(Austria) Alexander Wurz	Benetton-Playlife	0	Transmission	11	

== Championship standings after the race ==
Drivers' Championship standings

Pos	Driver	Points
1	(Finland) Mika Häkkinen	34
2	(Germany) Michael Schumacher	30
3	(United Kingdom) Eddie Irvine	25
4	(Germany) Heinz-Harald Frentzen	13
5	(Italy) Giancarlo Fisichella	13

Constructors' Championship standings

Pos	Constructor	Points
1	(Italy) Ferrari	55
2	(United Kingdom) McLaren-Mercedes	46
3	(Republic of Ireland) Jordan-Mugen-Honda	16
4	(Italy) Benetton-Playlife	14
5	(United Kingdom) Williams-Supertec	12

- Note: Only the top five positions are included for both sets of standings.

Previous race: 1999 Spanish Grand Prix	FIA Formula One World Championship; 1999 season	Next race: 1999 French Grand Prix
Previous race: 1998 Canadian Grand Prix	Canadian Grand Prix	Next race: 2000 Canadian Grand Prix
