= Cosworth JD / VJ engine =

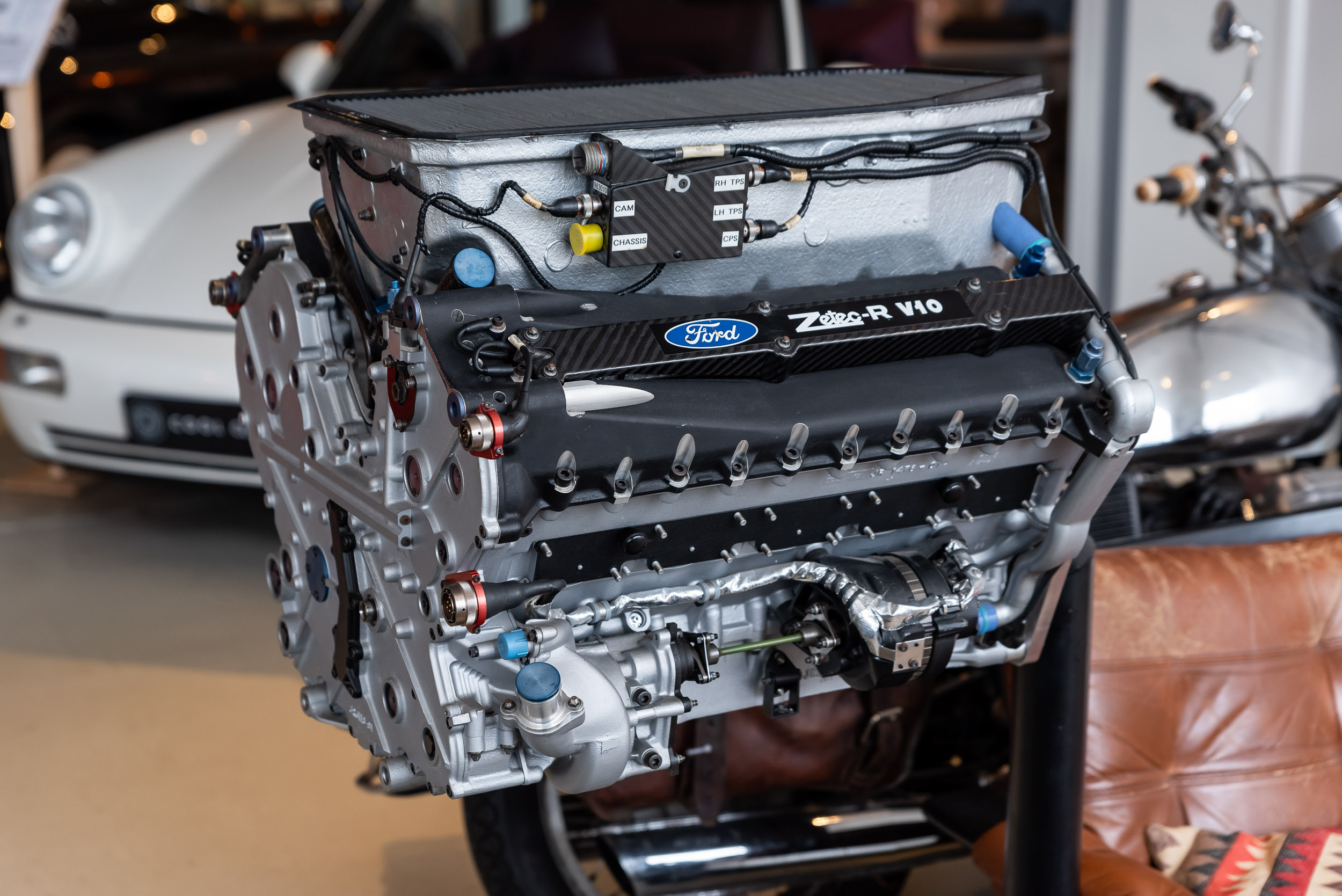

Overview
- Manufacturer: (United Kingdom) Ford-Cosworth
- Production: 1996–1999

Layout
- Configuration: 72° V10
- Displacement: 3.0 L (2,992 cc)
- Cylinder bore: 89 mm (3.5 in)
- Piston stroke: 48.1 mm (1.9 in)
- Cylinder block material: Aluminum alloy
- Cylinder head material: Aluminum alloy
- Valvetrain: 40-valve, DOHC, four-valves per cylinder

Combustion
- Turbocharger: No
- Fuel system: Port Fuel Injection
- Management: Cosworth ECU
- Oil system: Dry sump

Output
- Power output: 670–735 hp (500–548 kW)
- Torque output: approx. 230–270 lb⋅ft (312–366 N⋅m)

Dimensions
- Dry weight: 120 kg (265 lb)

Chronology
- Predecessor: Ford-Cosworth EC / ED engine
- Successor: Cosworth CR

The JD and VJ family is a series of 3.0-litre, naturally-aspirated V10 Formula One engines, designed by Cosworth in partnership with Ford; used between 1996 and 1999. The customer engines were used by Sauber, Stewart, Minardi, and Tyrrell.

== Overview ==
=== The JD, VJ and VJM V10 ===
In order to produce a higher power at higher rpm, a completely new 2,992 cc (182.6 cu in) (89mm x 48.1mm) JD 72° V10 was designed for 1996, which produced about 670 bhp at 15,800 rpm, and used by Sauber Formula One team. This engine was further developed into VJ and VJM with the same V-angle, bore and stroke, reaching 720 bhp for racing, 730 bhp for qualifying, at 16,500 rpm. All three of these engines were badged as Ford Zetec-R as well, and used by several teams. In its debut season, the best result was another third place, this time taken by Johnny Herbert at Monaco. This was surpassed one year later by Rubens Barichello's sensational second place, again at Monaco, which was the first points finish for the newly formed Stewart Grand Prix team.
