= 1999 San Marino Grand Prix =

Race 3 of 16 in the 1999 Formula One World Championship
← Previous race	Next race →
- Autodromo Enzo e Dino Ferrari (last modified in 1997)

Race details
- Date: 2 May 1999
- Official name: Gran Premio Warsteiner di San Marino 1999
- Location: Autodromo Enzo e Dino Ferrari; Imola, Emilia-Romagna, Italy
- Course: Permanent racing facility
- Course length: 4.930 km (3.064 miles)
- Distance: 62 laps, 305.660 km (189.937 miles)
- Weather: Sunny, mild, dry, 23 °C

Pole position
Driver	(Finland) Mika Häkkinen	McLaren-Mercedes
- Time: 1:26.362

Fastest lap
Driver	(Germany) Michael Schumacher	Ferrari
- Time: 1:28.362 on lap 45

Podium
First	(Germany) Michael Schumacher	Ferrari
Second	(United Kingdom) David Coulthard	McLaren-Mercedes
Third	(Brazil) Rubens Barrichello	Stewart-Ford

The 1999 San Marino Grand Prix (formally the Gran Premio Warsteiner di San Marino 1999) was a Formula One motor race held at Imola on 2 May 1999. It was the third race of the 1999 Formula One World Championship.

The 62-lap race was won by German Michael Schumacher, driving a Ferrari, after he started from third position. Finn Mika Häkkinen took pole position in his McLaren-Mercedes, but crashed out after 17 laps. Häkkinen's teammate, Briton David Coulthard, finished second, with Brazilian Rubens Barrichello third in a Stewart-Ford.

== Report ==
=== Race ===
Mika Häkkinen took an instant lead from David Coulthard and Michael Schumacher after the start. Eddie Irvine was ahead of Rubens Barrichello, Heinz-Harald Frentzen, Ralf Schumacher, Damon Hill and Jean Alesi. Jacques Villeneuve was left stranded on the grid after a clutch problem. In an unforced error, Häkkinen crashed out at the final Traguardo chicane on lap 17, allowing David Coulthard into the lead ahead of Michael Schumacher.

This remained unchanged until both drivers made pitstops for fuel and tyres. Schumacher stopped earlier and for a shorter time than Coulthard allowing him to take over the lead from the McLaren driver. Schumacher then gradually expanded his lead to a maximum of about 23 seconds before making a second pit stop. He was able to stay in first place and thereafter comfortably retained his position to secure his first win of the season.

Meanwhile, Schumacher's teammate Irvine had settled in third place following Häkkinen's retirement. He was forced to retire from the race himself when his Ferrari engine expired on lap 47. Frentzen span off shortly afterwards on the oil left by Irvine's Ferrari. This allowed Hill to inherit third place, but he made his final stop in a three stop strategy two laps later. Barrichello was consequently promoted to third place which he held until the end of the race ahead of Hill.

Johnny Herbert looked set to finish in fifth place until his Ford engine expired coming out of the Villeneuve chicane with three laps remaining. Alessandro Zanardi spun off shortly afterwards on the fluid spread by Herbert's stricken Stewart-Ford, allowing Giancarlo Fisichella and Alesi to complete the top six.

== Classification ==
=== Qualifying ===
Pos	No	Driver	Constructor	Time	Gap
1	1	(Finland) Mika Häkkinen	McLaren-Mercedes	1:26.362	
2	2	(United Kingdom) David Coulthard	McLaren-Mercedes	1:26.384	+0.022
3	3	(Germany) Michael Schumacher	Ferrari	1:26.538	+0.176
4	4	(United Kingdom) Eddie Irvine	Ferrari	1:26.993	+0.631
5	22	(Canada) Jacques Villeneuve	BAR-Supertec	1:27.313	+0.951
6	16	(Brazil) Rubens Barrichello	Stewart-Ford	1:27.409	+1.047
7	8	(Germany) Heinz-Harald Frentzen	Jordan-Mugen-Honda	1:27.613	+1.251
8	7	(United Kingdom) Damon Hill	Jordan-Mugen-Honda	1:27.708	+1.346
9	6	(Germany) Ralf Schumacher	Williams-Supertec	1:27.770	+1.408
10	5	(Italy) Alessandro Zanardi	Williams-Supertec	1:28.142	+1.780
11	18	(France) Olivier Panis	Prost-Peugeot	1:28.205	+1.843
12	17	(United Kingdom) Johnny Herbert	Stewart-Ford	1:28.246	+1.884
13	11	(France) Jean Alesi	Sauber-Petronas	1:28.253	+1.891
14	19	(Italy) Jarno Trulli	Prost-Peugeot	1:28.403	+2.041
15	12	(Brazil) Pedro Diniz	Sauber-Petronas	1:28.599	+2.237
16	9	(Italy) Giancarlo Fisichella	Benetton-Playlife	1:28.750	+2.388
17	10	(Austria) Alexander Wurz	Benetton-Playlife	1:28.765	+2.403
18	14	(Spain) Pedro de la Rosa	Arrows	1:29.293	+2.931
19	23	(Finland) Mika Salo	BAR-Supertec	1:29.451	+3.089
20	15	(Japan) Toranosuke Takagi	Arrows	1:29.656	+3.294
21	21	(Spain) Marc Gené	Minardi-Ford	1:30.035	+3.673
22	20	(Italy) Luca Badoer	Minardi-Ford	1:30.945	+4.583
107% time: 1:32.407

=== Race ===
Pos	No	Driver	Constructor	Laps	Time/Retired	Grid	Points
1	3	(Germany) Michael Schumacher	Ferrari	62	1:33:44.792	3	10
2	2	(United Kingdom) David Coulthard	McLaren-Mercedes	62	+ 4.265	2	6
3	16	(Brazil) Rubens Barrichello	Stewart-Ford	61	+ 1 lap	6	4
4	7	(United Kingdom) Damon Hill	Jordan-Mugen-Honda	61	+ 1 lap	8	3
5	9	(Italy) Giancarlo Fisichella	Benetton-Playlife	61	+ 1 lap	16	2
6	11	(France) Jean Alesi	Sauber-Petronas	61	+ 1 lap	13	1
7	23	(Finland) Mika Salo	BAR-Supertec	59	Electrical	19	
8	20	(Italy) Luca Badoer	Minardi-Ford	59	+ 3 laps	22	
9	21	(Spain) Marc Gené	Minardi-Ford	59	+ 3 laps	21	
10	17	(United Kingdom) Johnny Herbert	Stewart-Ford	58	Engine	12	
11	5	(Italy) Alessandro Zanardi	Williams-Supertec	58	Spun off	10	
Ret	12	(Brazil) Pedro Diniz	Sauber-Petronas	49	Spun off	15	
Ret	18	(France) Olivier Panis	Prost-Peugeot	48	Throttle	11	
Ret	4	(United Kingdom) Eddie Irvine	Ferrari	46	Engine	4	
Ret	8	(Germany) Heinz-Harald Frentzen	Jordan-Mugen-Honda	46	Engine/Spun off	7	
Ret	15	(Japan) Toranosuke Takagi	Arrows	29	Fuel pressure	20	
Ret	6	(Germany) Ralf Schumacher	Williams-Supertec	28	Electrical	9	
Ret	1	(Finland) Mika Häkkinen	McLaren-Mercedes	17	Accident	1	
Ret	14	(Spain) Pedro de la Rosa	Arrows	5	Collision	18	
Ret	10	(Austria) Alexander Wurz	Benetton-Playlife	5	Collision	17	
Ret	22	(Canada) Jacques Villeneuve	BAR-Supertec	0	Gearbox	5	
Ret	19	(Italy) Jarno Trulli	Prost-Peugeot	0	Spun off	14	

== Championship standings after the race ==
Drivers' Championship standings

Pos	Driver	Points
1	(Germany) Michael Schumacher	16
2	(United Kingdom) Eddie Irvine	12
3	(Finland) Mika Häkkinen	10
4	(Germany) Heinz-Harald Frentzen	10
5	(Germany) Ralf Schumacher	7

Constructors' Championship standings

Pos	Constructor	Points
1	(Italy) Ferrari	28
2	(United Kingdom) McLaren-Mercedes	16
3	(Republic of Ireland) Jordan-Mugen-Honda	13
4	(United Kingdom) Williams-Supertec	7
5	(United Kingdom) Stewart-Ford	6

- Note: Only the top five positions are included for both sets of standings.

Previous race: 1999 Brazilian Grand Prix	FIA Formula One World Championship; 1999 season	Next race: 1999 Monaco Grand Prix
Previous race: 1998 San Marino Grand Prix	San Marino Grand Prix	Next race: 2000 San Marino Grand Prix
