= Eghbal Hamidy =

Iranian motorsport engineer

- Born: 1 August 1960 (age 66); Shiraz, Iran
- Education: Imperial College London
- Occupation: Formula One car designer
- Employer: EHE Limited (owner)

Eghbal Hamidy (Persian: اقبال حمیدی; born 1 August 1960) is an Iranian aerodynamic engineer. He was technical director and aerodynamics expert for several Formula 1 (F1) teams in the 1990s and early 2000s.

== Career ==
Hamidy was one of the very few Iranian engineers working in F1. He graduated from Imperial College in London, majoring in aeronautical engineering (undergraduate and post-graduate) and vehicle dynamics for his doctoral program in the late 1980s.

He started his career in the Williams team in 1989 as an aerodynamicist. During his time at Williams he worked with Patrick Head, Enrique Scalabroni and Adrian Newey. He stayed in the team until the end of 1995. His best achievement was when he helped Nigel Mansell (1992), Alain Prost (1993) and Damon Hill (1996) to World Champion titles and the Williams team to constructor's Championship Titles in 1992, 1993, 1994 and 1996. In 1996 he left for the Stewart GP team.

At Stewart GP, Hamidy served as chief Aerodynamicist working with Alan Jenkins. At that time, he was known as an expert in designing great cars on wet tracks, because every time there was a rainy race condition, Stewart GP's appearance was always stunning. His first car at Stewart GP, SF01, came second in Monaco Grand Prix piloted by Rubens Barrichello.

Even when he left for Arrows in 1999, Hamidy's influence was felt on Stewart. Rubens Barrichello recorded pole in France and Johnny Herbert recorded victory at the Nürburgring.

In the team led by Tom Walkinshaw, Hamidy earned the reputation as an expert in designing fast cars on the low-downforce style circuit. This is evidenced by the speed of Jos Verstappen in the 2000 Austrian Grand Prix, the 2000 Italian Grand Prix, and finally the 2001 Austrian Grand Prix.

He moved to Jordan in early 2001. He helped with the development of Jordan's EJ11 and EJ12. Unfortunately his spell at the Jordan team was not successful and led to his departure in early 2002.

Currently, he owns an engineering consultancy business, named EHE Limited.
