= Johnny Herbert =

British racing driver and broadcaster (born 1964)

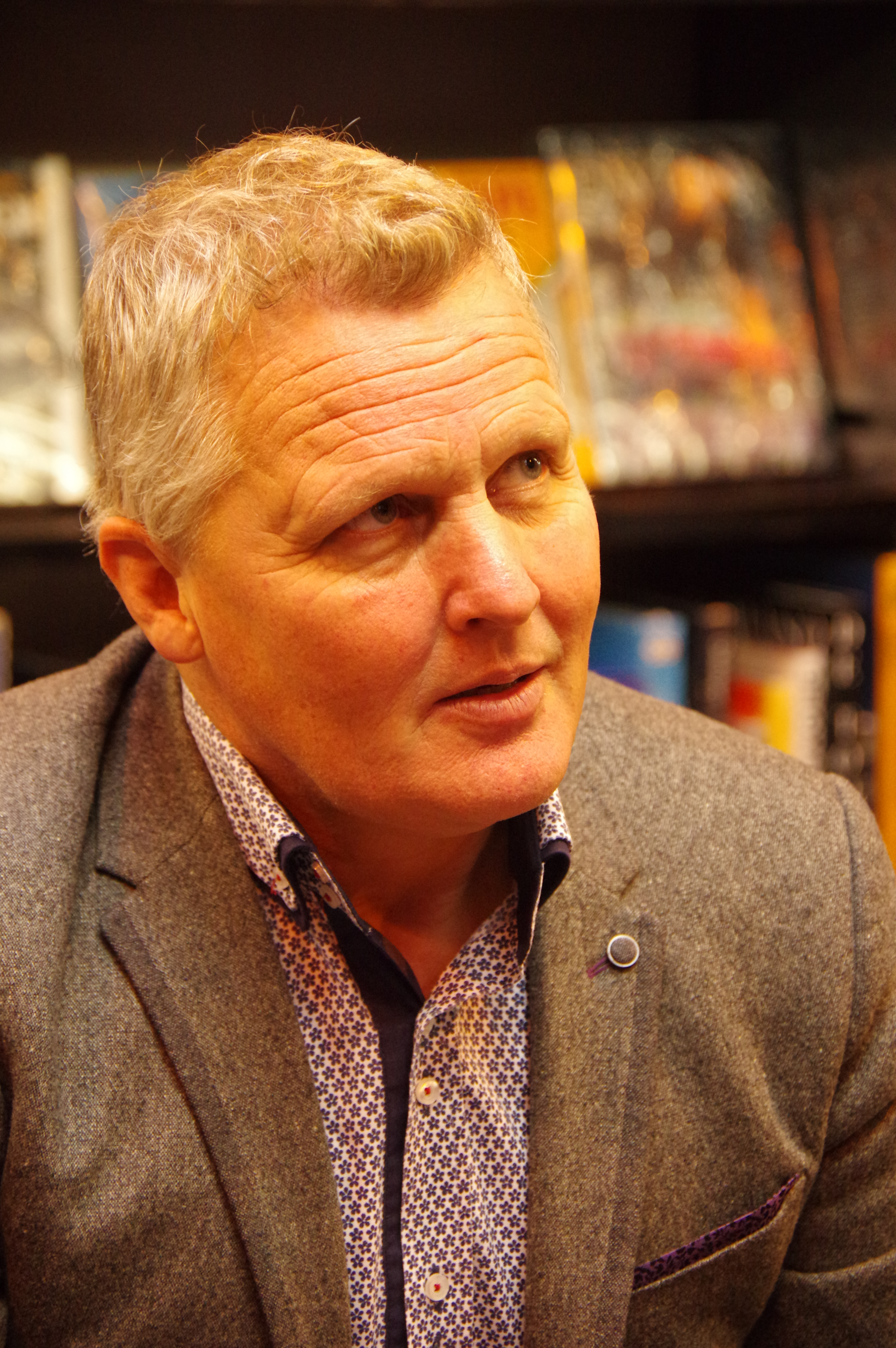
- Herbert in 2016
- Born: John Paul Herbert; 25 June 1964 (age 62); Brentwood, Essex, England
- Spouse: Rebecca Cross (m. 1991)
- Children: 2

Formula One World Championship career
- Nationality: (United Kingdom) British
- Active years: 1989–2000
- Team(s): Benetton, Tyrrell, Lotus, Ligier, Sauber, Stewart, Jaguar
- Entries: 165 (160 starts)
- Championships: 0
- Wins: 3
- Podiums: 7
- Career points: 98
- Pole positions: 0
- Fastest laps: 0
- First entry: 1989 Brazilian Grand Prix
- First win: 1995 British Grand Prix
- Last win: 1999 European Grand Prix
- Last entry: 2000 Malaysian Grand Prix

24 Hours of Le Mans career
- Years: 1990–1992, 2001–2004, 2007
- Teams: Mazda, Champion, Audi, Bentley, Aston Martin
- Best finish: 1st (1991)
- Class wins: 1 (1991)

John Paul Herbert (born 25 June 1964) is a British former racing driver and broadcaster who competed in Formula One from 1989 to 2000. Herbert won three Formula One Grands Prix across twelve seasons. In endurance racing, Herbert won the 24 Hours of Le Mans in 1991 with Mazda, as well as the 12 Hours of Sebring in 2002 with Audi.

Herbert competed in Formula One for Benetton, Tyrrell, Lotus, Ligier, Sauber, Stewart and Jaguar. He finished fourth in the 1995 World Championship with Benetton. Upon his retirement from motor racing, Herbert worked as a pundit for Sky Sports F1 from 2012 until 2022.

== Career ==
=== Early career and entry to Formula One (1985-1993) ===
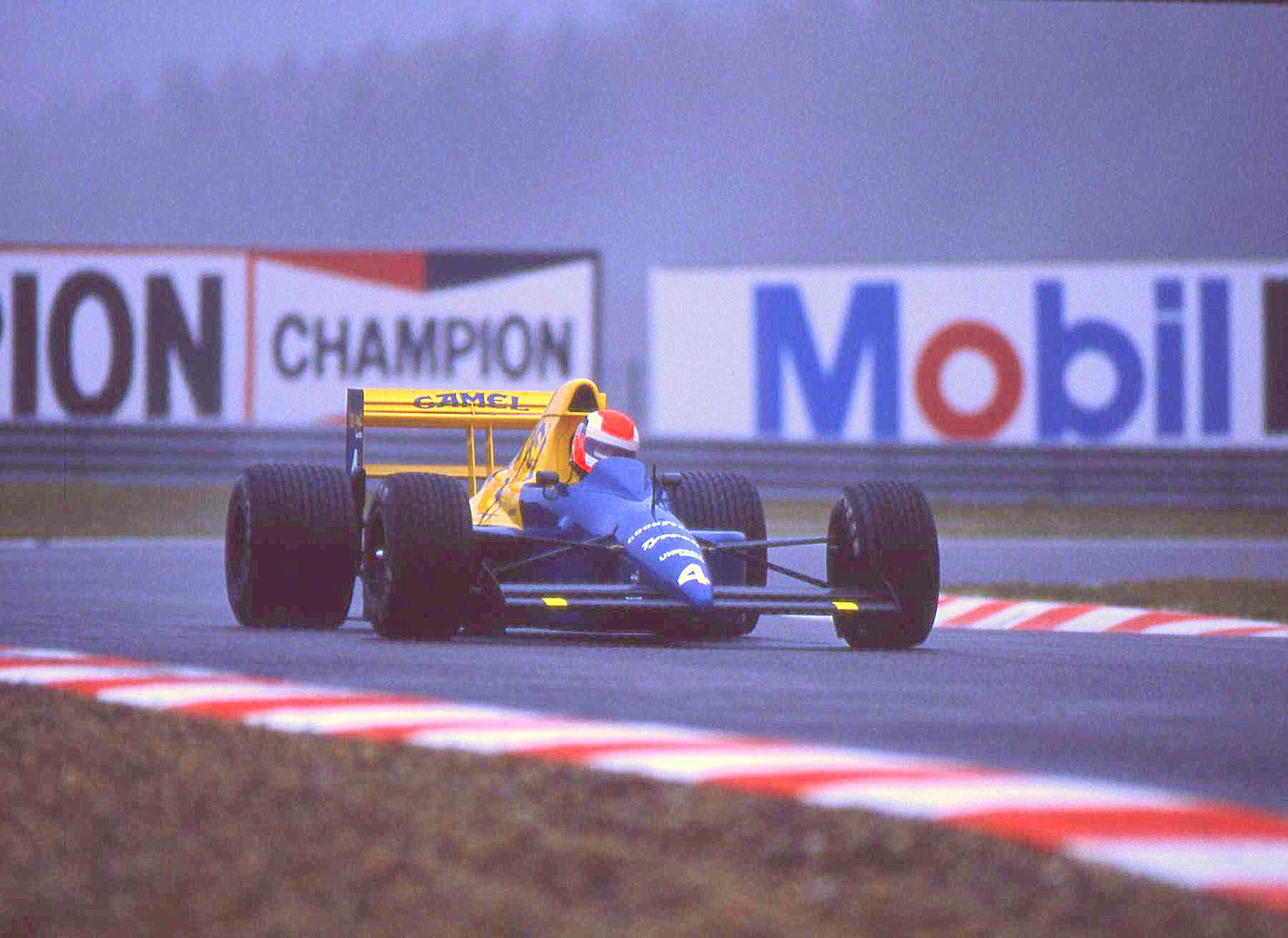
Herbert driving for Tyrrell at the 1989 Belgian Grand Prix.

==== Formula Ford and Formula 3 ====
Winning the Formula Ford Festival at Brands Hatch in 1985, Herbert caught Eddie Jordan's attention, and together they won the 1987 British Formula 3 title.

==== MG Metro Turbo Challenge ====
At the end of August 1987, Herbert (and fellow future F1 Driver Bertrand Gachot) guested in the ESSO MG Metro Turbo Challenge at Silverstone. He took pole and led most of the race, until a clutch failure forced him to retire with a lap to go. He and Gachot would later go on to win Le Mans in 1991 with ex-Rial F1 Driver Volker Weidler.

==== Ford Escort Celebrity Race ====
In October 1987, Herbert took part in a Ford Escort Celebrity race at Brands Hatch, sharing with Bobby Gee. They finished third.

==== Formula 3000 and early Formula One career ====
Herbert suffered career-threatening injuries in 1988, as a then championship hopeful in International Formula 3000 when he was caught up in a major accident at Brands Hatch, when Gregor Foitek nudged the side of his vehicle at Pilgrim's Drop, causing Herbert to slam into the wall head-on, then bounce across the track and slam head on again into the opposite barrier, sustaining severe ankle and foot injuries after yet more multiple collisions with the barriers. The threat of amputation loomed but it eventually passed after multiple surgeries and months of physiotherapy, though the extent of Herbert's injuries would permanently hinder his mobility, leaving him unable to run and forcing him to change his driving style.

Despite his immobility, Herbert returned to racing at the beginning of 1989 in Formula 1, scoring points on his debut at the Brazilian Grand Prix in Rio de Janeiro driving for the Benetton team, then managed by his long-time mentor and friend Peter Collins. Herbert finished fourth in Brazil, only 10.5 seconds behind the race winning Ferrari of Nigel Mansell and only 1.1 seconds behind the third placed March-Judd of Maurício Gugelmin and only 2.6 seconds behind the second placed McLaren-Honda of then double World Champion Alain Prost. Herbert's teammate, the highly rated Italian Alessandro Nannini, finished in sixth place, 7.7 seconds behind Herbert.

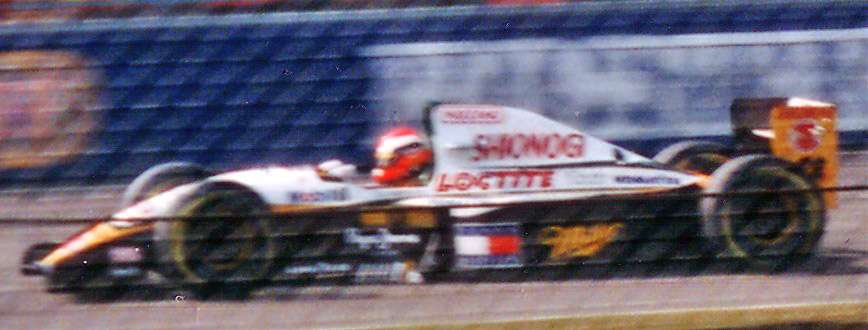
Herbert driving for Lotus at the 1994 British Grand Prix. He finished eleventh.

However, Herbert's performances could not keep up to that standard (he reportedly found it hard to press the brake pedal, which adversely affected his lap times), and with the Benetton team under new management (with Flavio Briatore) he was dropped after failing to qualify for the Canadian Grand Prix (after having finished fifth in the previous round in Phoenix) and was replaced by McLaren's test driver Emanuele Pirro. Herbert returned to Formula 3000, this time in the highly regarded Japanese series. It was not long before he received another call from Formula One, this time with Tyrrell. From 1990 to 2000, Herbert was a fixture in Formula One, switching to the dwindling Lotus team, now managed by Peter Collins. His first race for the Norfolk-based team came at the 1990 Japanese Grand Prix after Martin Donnelly suffered a career-ending crash in Jerez.

In 1991, Herbert returned to the team at the Canadian Grand Prix following the departure of Julian Bailey. He had to relinquish his seat to Michael Bartels while Grands Prix clashed with Japanese F3000 meetings. His first points finish in almost three years came at the 1992 South African Grand Prix when he drove his two-year old Lotus chassis to sixth place. He repeated this result in France, by which time Lotus had introduced the more competitive 107. Poor reliability and bad luck cost him the chance to add to his points tally but Herbert showed well against his highly rated teammate, future-World Champion Mika Häkkinen. In the 24 races the two drove alongside each other at Lotus, Herbert outqualified Häkkinen fourteen times. 1993 was his most successful season with Lotus, finishing in fourth place three times. But 1994 was a disaster as the team was blighted by financial woes. He utilised an upgraded Mugen Honda introduced for the Italian Grand Prix to qualify a magnificent fourth but hopes of a strong finish were quashed when he was involved in a multi-car collision at the first corner. Lotus' lack of resources meant he had to use the spare car with the old-spec Mugen engine, which didn't last long before it expired. His final race for Lotus came at the Portuguese Grand Prix.

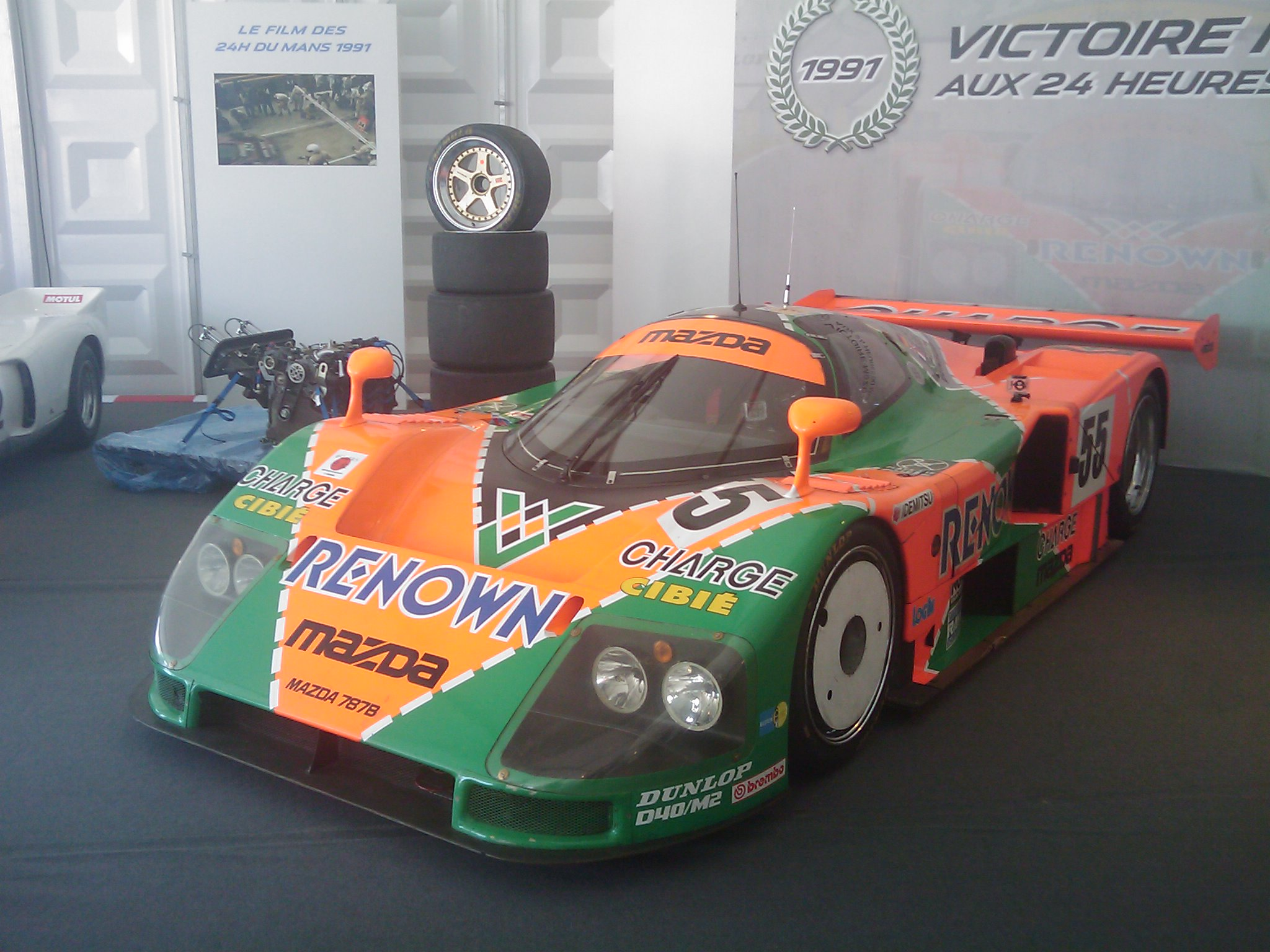
Herbert was among the drivers who drove this Mazda 787B to victory at the 1991 24 Hours of Le Mans.

During 1991, Herbert also drove two rounds of the Fuji Long Distance Sports Car Series, co-driving a Mazda 787B, finishing fourth both times. His decision at the July round to stop his car and aid a fellow competitor who had suffered a puncture at high speed would earn him the Sportsman Award at the 1991 Autosport Awards.

=== Ligier and return to Benetton (1994–1995) ===
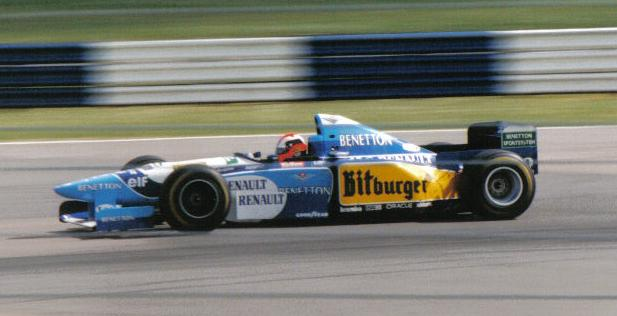
Herbert moved to Benetton for 1995 and took his first Formula One victory at the 1995 British Grand Prix.

After three years of frustration, Herbert had his Lotus contract bought out by Tom Walkinshaw in late 1994, joining Ligier and then Benetton for the last few races of the season. Although he failed to score any points in 1994, he was retained as Michael Schumacher's teammate for 1995. As Benetton's number-two driver he found life at the team difficult with the B195 specifically designed around Schumacher's driving style. The World Champion also forbade Herbert from viewing his telemetry. He achieved his first podium finish with a second place in Spain as Benetton scored their first one-two finish since 1990. He then took his first victory at the British Grand Prix after Damon Hill and Michael Schumacher collided. Prior to the race rumours were abound that he was about to be dropped in favour of test-driver Jos Verstappen. He followed this with a win in similar circumstances at Monza and finished 4th in the championship.

=== Sauber, Stewart and Jaguar (1996–2000) ===
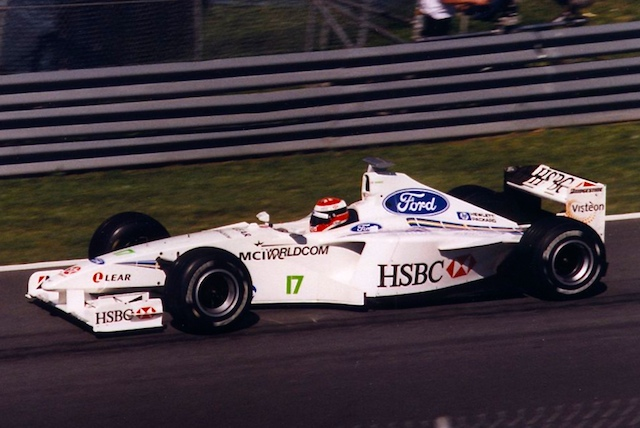
Herbert driving for Stewart at the 1999 Canadian Grand Prix. He brought the car home in fifth.

After being dropped by Benetton, Herbert drove for Swiss team Sauber in 1996–1998, scoring two podium places, the first of the two being in the 1996 Monaco Grand Prix, which were his only points of that season, and the other being in the 1997 Hungarian Grand Prix. That year would be Herbert's most successful at Sauber, scoring several times. Moving to Stewart Grand Prix in 1999, he was routinely outqualified by his younger teammate Rubens Barrichello but scored his third and final Grand Prix win in the rain-affected European Grand Prix. At the Malaysian Grand Prix, he finished fourth in a race which he would later describe as his strongest performance since his pre-accident days. Staying at Stewart after the team was purchased by Ford and became Jaguar, Herbert endured another frustrating and pointless season, ending the year being stretchered off at Malaysia after a suspension failure caused him to crash heavily.

=== After Formula One ===
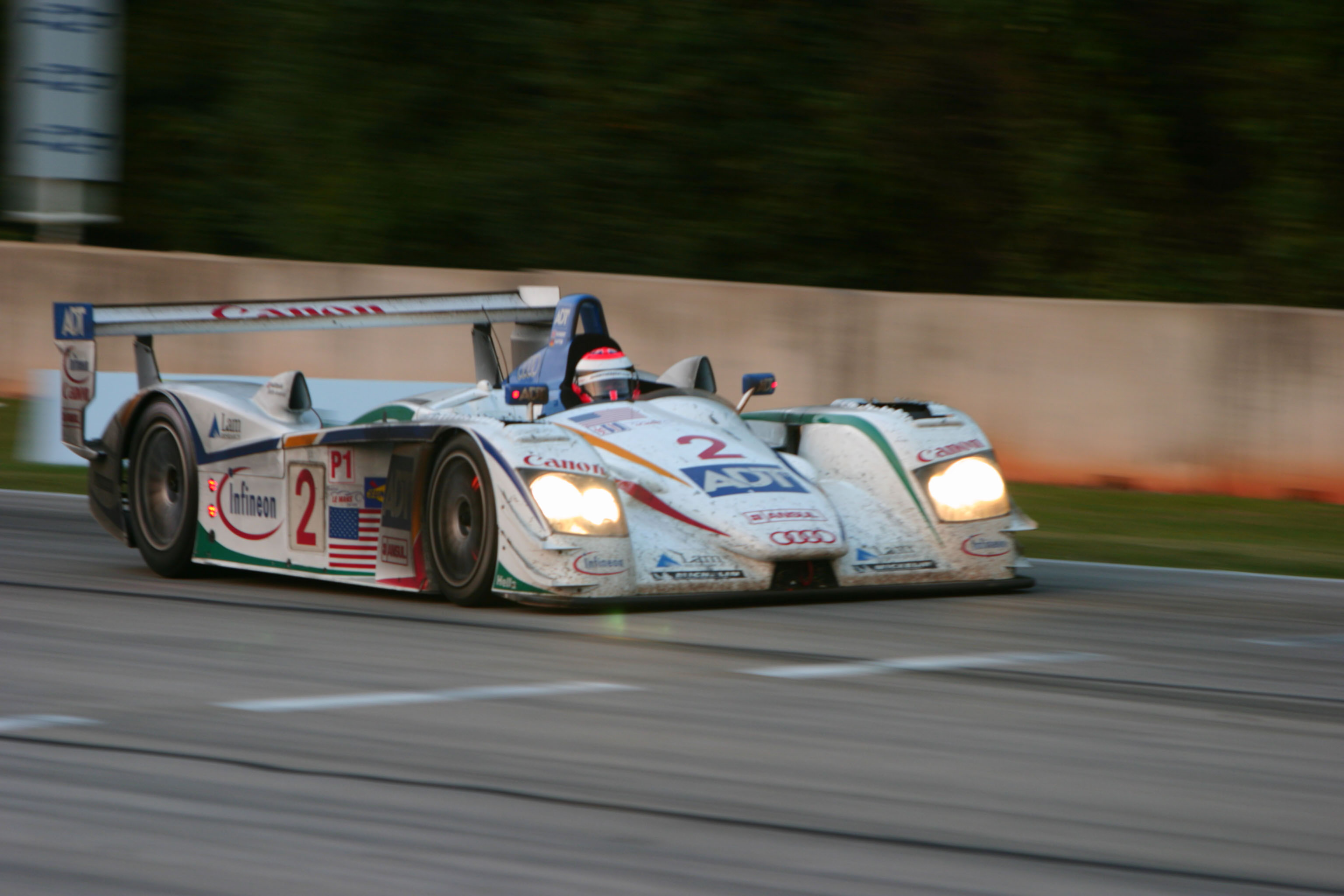
Herbert driving for Audi in the 2004 Petit Le Mans. He came second, partnered with Pierre Kaffer.

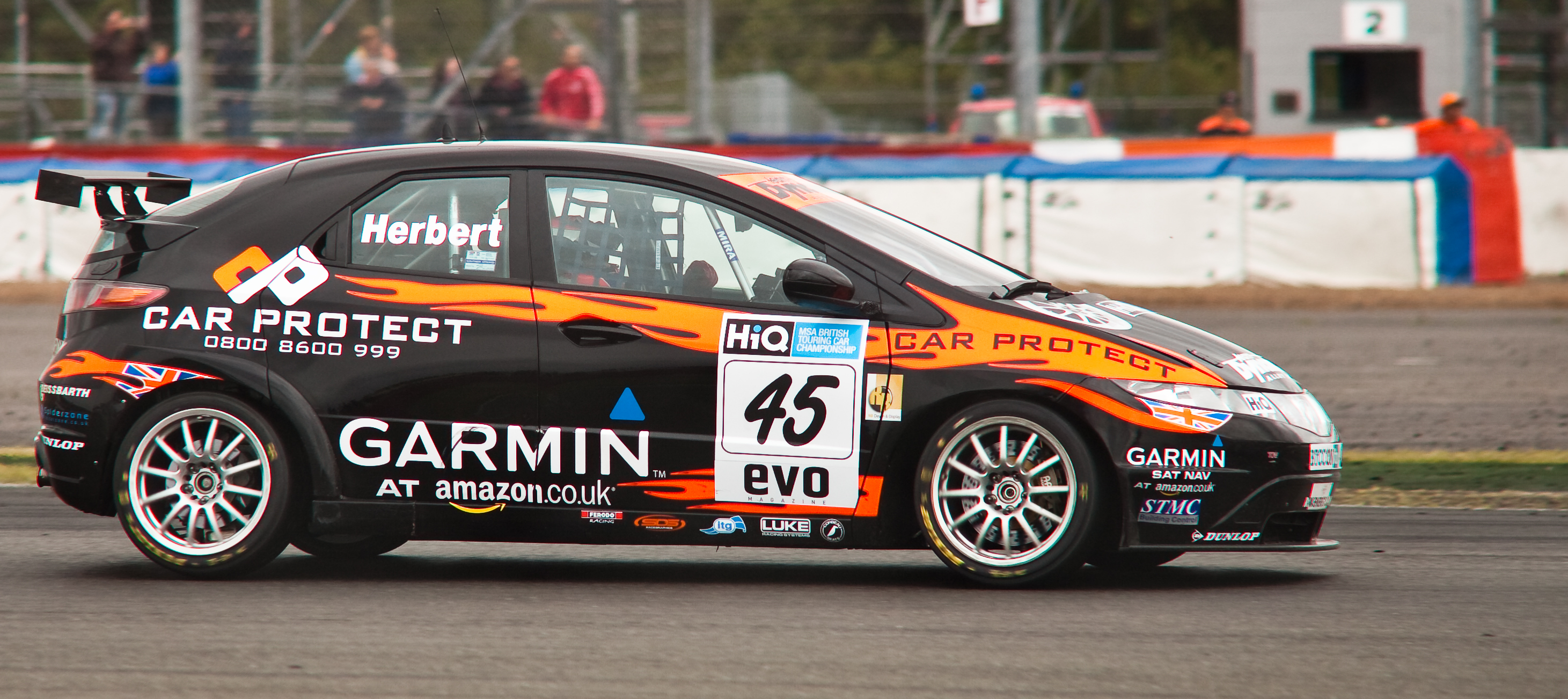
Herbert driving the Team Dynamics Honda Civic at Silverstone during the 2009 British Touring Car Championship season.

In 2001, Herbert was employed by Arrows F1 team owner Tom Walkinshaw, to act as the team developmental/test driver.

On Monday, August 13, 2001, the day after the Indy Racing League’s Belterra Resort Indy 300 at Kentucky Speedway, Herbert tested the Dallara purchased by Mecom Racing Team from Target Chip Ganassi Racing and driven by Tony Stewart at the 2001 Indianapolis 500, with the car being set up by Jeff Ward, recording a fastest lap time that would have split the front row for the race.

Since retiring from Formula One racing, Herbert has concentrated on sports car racing, trying to repeat his Le Mans 24 Hours overall win of 1991. Recent years have seen him as one of the front runners in the American Le Mans Series (ALMS), where he won several events and was a challenger for the 2003 crown.

In 2004, Herbert, along with Jamie Davies won the Le Mans Series championship at the wheel of an Audi R8 winning the races at Monza and Spa along the way.

In 2005, Herbert was appointed to the post of Sporting Relations Manager at Jordan Grand Prix, which was then renamed Midland F1 for the 2006 World Championship. However, in September of that year Spyker Cars bought the team, and renamed it Spyker MF1. One of the new owners' decisions was to not renew Herbert's contract.

In 2007, Herbert entered the Le Mans 24 Hours driving for the factory Aston Martin team at the wheel of the Aston Martin DBR9 in the GT1 class. Herbert, along with Peter Kox and Tomáš Enge drove the 007 numbered car to a ninth placed overall finish and fourth in the GT1 class.

In 2008, Herbert won the first season of the Speedcar Series.

In 2009, Herbert made his debut in the British Touring Car Championship for Team Dynamics at the wheel of a Honda Civic at round eight of the championship, Silverstone. He qualified seventeenth for the first race, and after moving up the order, finished in thirteenth. In the second race, he finished inside the points in eighth place, scoring three points. In the final race of the day, a reverse starting grid is operated. The first six, seven, eight, nine or ten cars to finish race two, start race three in reverse order. This is decided by the winner of race two drawing a number between six and ten out of a hat. For the final race of the day, the top-nine finishers were reversed, meaning Herbert started from second. He was running well, and was holding fourth, but was forced to retire on lap thirteen, after contact with Jason Plato. Herbert went on to compete in the final two rounds of the season.

Herbert also runs a charity event called the Johnny Herbert Karting Challenge every year for charities like the halow project which is now held at Capital Karts in London. This event invites celebrities and professional racing drivers to compete in indoor go karting and is now in its twentieth year.

=== Sky Sports F1 ===
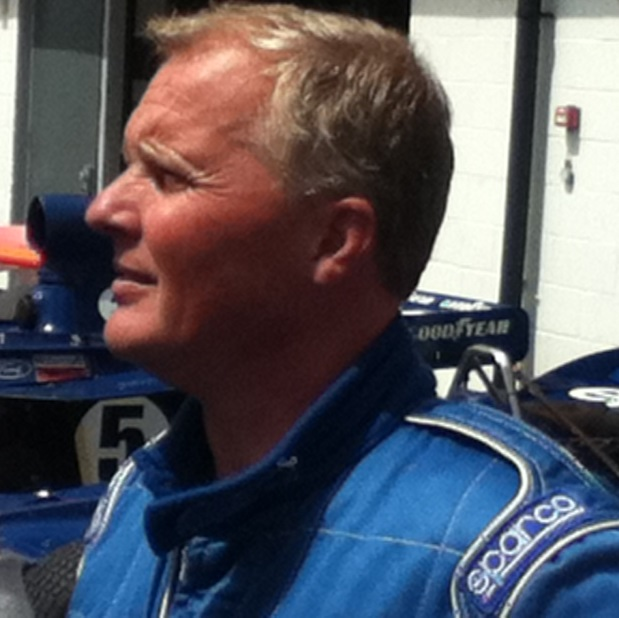
Herbert in the Silverstone pit lane for the 2014 British Grand Prix

From 2012 to 2022, Herbert was a regular contributor to the Sky Sports F1 channel. He was an occasional presence as one of the insiders in "Sky Race Control" during practices, qualifying sessions, and races alongside Anthony Davidson, Damon Hill, Nico Rosberg, and Paul di Resta.

=== GT Academy ===
In 2013 and 2014, Herbert mentored six contestants in a primetime ITV4 reality series, with the aim of taking players of the Gran Turismo videogames to the Dubai 24 Hour race as real drivers. Other countries in Europe had heats mentored by drivers Vitantonio Liuzzi and Sébastien Buemi.

== Racing record ==
=== Career summary ===
Season	Series	Team	Races	Wins	Poles	F/Laps	Podiums	Points	Position
1985	Formula Ford Festival		1	1	0	?	1	N/A	**1st**
1986	British Formula 3 Championship	Mike Rowe Racing / Intersport Racing	6	0	0	0	0	8	15th
1987	British Formula 3 Championship	Eddie Jordan Racing	18	5	7	5	10	79	**1st**
1987	Macau Grand Prix	Eddie Jordan Racing	1	0	0	0	0	N/A	18th
1988	International Formula 3000	Eddie Jordan Racing	6	1	2	1	2	13	8th
1988	World Sportscar Championship	ADA Engineering	1	0	0	0	0	0	NC
1989	Formula One	Benetton Formula	5	0	0	0	0	5	14th
1989	Formula One	Tyrrell Racing Organisation	1	0	0	0	0	5	14th
1989	All-Japan Sports Prototype Championship	Takefuji Racing Team	1	0	0	0	0	6	29th
1990	Japanese Formula 3000	Team LeMans	10	0	0	0	0	3	16th
1990	All-Japan Sports Prototype Championship	Takefuji Racing Team	5	0	0	0	0	10	20th
1990	Formula One	Camel Team Lotus	2	0	0	0	0	0	NC
1990	24 Hours of Le Mans	Mazdaspeed	1	0	0	0	0	N/A	DNF
1991	Japanese Formula 3000	Team LeMans	10	0	0	0	1	9	10th
1991	Formula One	Team Lotus	7	0	0	0	0	0	NC
1991	All-Japan Sports Prototype Championship	Mazdaspeed	2	0	0	0	0	20	19th
1991	24 Hours of Le Mans	Mazdaspeed	1	1	0	0	1	N/A	**1st**
1992	Formula One	Team Lotus; Team Castrol Lotus	16	0	0	0	0	2	15th
1992	World Sportscar Championship	Mazdaspeed	2	0	0	0	1	25	7th
1993	Formula One	Team Castrol Lotus	16	0	0	0	0	11	9th
1994	Formula One	Team Lotus	13	0	0	0	0	0	NC
1994	Formula One	Mild Seven Benetton Ford	2	0	0	0	0	0	NC
1994	Formula One	Ligier Gitanes Blondes	1	0	0	0	0	0	NC
1995	Formula One	Mild Seven Benetton Renault	17	2	0	0	4	45	4th
1996	Formula One	Red Bull Sauber Ford	15	0	0	0	1	4	14th
1997	Formula One	Red Bull Sauber Petronas	17	0	0	0	1	15	10th
1998	Formula One	Red Bull Sauber Petronas	16	0	0	0	0	1	15th
1999	Formula One	HSBC Stewart Ford	15	1	0	0	1	15	8th
2000	Formula One	Jaguar Racing	17	0	0	0	0	0	NC
2001	American Le Mans Series	Champion Racing	6	0	0	0	3	113	8th
2001	24 Hours of Le Mans	Champion Racing	1	0	0	0	0	N/A	DNF
2002	American Le Mans Series	Audi Sport North America	1	1	0	0	1	206	4th
2002	American Le Mans Series	Champion Racing	9	0	0	0	6	206	4th
2002	24 Hours of Le Mans	Audi Sport North America	1	0	0	0	1	N/A	**2nd**
2003	American Le Mans Series	ADT Champion Racing	1	0	0	0	0	160	4th
2003	American Le Mans Series	Team Bentley	8	4	0	2	7	160	4th
2003	24 Hours of Le Mans	Team Bentley	1	0	0	1	1	N/A	**2nd**
2004	FIA GT Championship	AF Corse	4	0	0	0	3	8	31st
2004	Le Mans Endurance Series	Audi Sport UK Team Veloqx	4	2	1	1	4	34	**1st**
2004	American Le Mans Series	ADT Champion Racing	2	1	0	0	2	64	8th
2004	American Le Mans Series	Audi Sport UK Team Veloqx	1	0	0	0	1	64	8th
2004	24 Hours of Le Mans	Audi Sport UK Team Veloqx	1	0	1	0	1	N/A	**2nd**
2005	Le Mans Legend		1	1	1	1	1	N/A	**1st**
2007	24 Hours of Le Mans	Aston Martin Racing	1	0	0	0	0	N/A	9th
2008	Speedcar Series	Speedcar Team	10	2	1	3	4	45	**1st**
2008–09	Speedcar Series	JMB Racing	9	2	1	0	5	53	**2nd**
2009	British Touring Car Championship	Team Dynamics	9	0	0	0	0	8	19th
2010	International Superstars Series	Motorzone Race Car	12	1	0	1	4	66	7th
2010	Campionato Italiano Superstars	Motorzone Race Car	8	0	0	0	2	33	11th
2010	Volkswagen Scirocco R-Cup		2	0	1	0	1	0	NC†
2011	International Superstars Series	Romeo Ferraris	16	0	0	1	4	96	6th
2011	Campionato Italiano Superstars	Romeo Ferraris	10	0	0	1	3	69	6th
2011	Blancpain Endurance Series	United Autosports	1	0	0	0	0	0	NC
2011	24 Hours of Nürburgring - SP8T	Volkswagen Motorsport	1	0	0	0	0	N/A	DNF
2011	Volkswagen Scirocco R-Cup		1	0	0	0	0	N/A	NC†
2012	Superstars Series	Swiss Team	4	0	0	1	2	36	12th
2012	Campionato Italiano Superstars	Swiss Team	2	0	0	1	1	18	18th

^{†} As Herbert was a guest driver, he was ineligible for championship points.

=== Complete British Formula Three Championship results ===
(key)

Year	Entrant	Engine	Class	1	2	3	4	5	6	7	8	9	10	11	12	13	14	15	16	17	18	19	DC	Pts
1987	Eddie Jordan Racing	VW	A	SIL; C	**THR**; 1	BRH; 1	**SIL**; 3	**THR**; 1	**SIL**; 1	BRH; 2	**THR**; Ret	SIL; 1	ZAN; 9	**DON**; Ret	SIL; 4	SNE; 3	DON; 19	OUL; 2	SIL; 7	**BRH**; 5	SPA; DNS	THR; 3	**1st**	**79**

=== Complete International Formula 3000 results ===
(key) (Races in bold indicate pole position) (Races in italics indicate fastest lap)

Year	Entrant	1	2	3	4	5	6	7	8	9	10	11	DC	Points
1988	Jordan Racing	**JER**; 1	VAL; Ret	PAU	SIL; 7	MON; 3	PER; Ret	**BRH**; Ret	BIR	BUG	ZOL	DIJ	8th	13

=== Complete Formula One results ===
(key) (Races in bold indicate pole position)

Year	Entrant	Chassis	Engine	1	2	3	4	5	6	7	8	9	10	11	12	13	14	15	16	17	WDC	Pts.
1989	Benetton Formula	Benetton B188	Ford-Cosworth DFR V8	BRA; 4	SMR; 11	MON; 14	MEX; 15	USA; 5	CAN; DNQ	FRA	GBR	GER	HUN								14th	5
1989	Tyrrell Racing Organisation	Tyrrell 018	Ford-Cosworth DFR V8											BEL; Ret	ITA	POR; DNQ	ESP	JPN	AUS		14th	5
1990	Camel Team Lotus	Lotus 102	Lamborghini LE3512 V12	USA	BRA	SMR	MON	CAN	MEX	FRA	GBR	GER	HUN	BEL	ITA	POR	ESP	JPN; Ret	AUS; Ret		NC	0
1991	Team Lotus	Lotus 102B	Judd EV V8	USA	BRA	SMR	MON	CAN; DNQ	MEX; 10	FRA; 10	GBR; 14^{†}	GER	HUN	BEL; 7	ITA	POR; Ret	ESP	JPN; Ret	AUS; 11		NC	0
1992	Team Lotus	Lotus 102D	Ford-Cosworth HBA5/HBA6 V8	RSA; 6	MEX; 7	BRA; Ret	ESP; Ret														15th	2
1992	Team Lotus	Lotus 107	Ford-Cosworth HBA5/HBA6 V8					SMR; Ret	MON; Ret	CAN; Ret	FRA; 6										15th	2
1992	Team Castrol Lotus	Lotus 107	Ford-Cosworth HBA5/HBA6 V8									GBR; Ret	GER; Ret	HUN; Ret	BEL; 13^{†}	ITA; Ret	POR; Ret	JPN; Ret	AUS; 13		15th	2
1993	Team Castrol Lotus	Lotus 107B	Ford-Cosworth HBA6 V8	RSA; Ret	BRA; 4	EUR; 4	SMR; 8^{†}	ESP; Ret	MON; Ret	CAN; 10	FRA; Ret	GBR; 4	GER; 10	HUN; Ret	BEL; 5	ITA; Ret	POR; Ret	JPN; 11	AUS; Ret		9th	11
1994	Team Lotus	Lotus 107C	Mugen-Honda MF351HC V10	BRA; 7	PAC; 7	SMR; 10	MON; Ret														NC	0
1994	Team Lotus	Lotus 109	Mugen-Honda MF351HC V10					ESP; Ret	CAN; 8	FRA; 7	GBR; 11	GER; Ret	HUN; Ret	BEL; 12	ITA; Ret	POR; 11					NC	0
1994	Ligier Gitanes Blondes	Ligier JS39B	Renault RS6 V10														EUR; 8				NC	0
1994	Mild Seven Benetton Ford	Benetton B194	Ford-Cosworth EC Zetec-R V8															JPN; Ret	AUS; Ret		NC	0
1995	Mild Seven Benetton Renault	Benetton B195	Renault RS7 3.0 V10	BRA; Ret	ARG; 4	SMR; 7	ESP; 2	MON; 4	CAN; Ret	FRA; Ret	GBR; 1	GER; 4	HUN; 4	BEL; 7	ITA; 1	POR; 7	EUR; 5	PAC; 6	JPN; 3	AUS; Ret	4th	45
1996	Red Bull Sauber Ford	Sauber C15	Ford-Cosworth JD Zetec-R V10	AUS; DNS	BRA; Ret	ARG; 9	EUR; 7	SMR; Ret	MON; 3	ESP; Ret	CAN; 7	FRA; DSQ	GBR; 9	GER; Ret	HUN; Ret	BEL; Ret	ITA; 9^{†}	POR; 8	JPN; 10		14th	4
1997	Red Bull Sauber Petronas	Sauber C16	Petronas SPE-01 V10	AUS; Ret	BRA; 7	ARG; 4	SMR; Ret	MON; Ret	ESP; 5	CAN; 5	FRA; 8	GBR; Ret	GER; Ret	HUN; 3	BEL; 4	ITA; Ret	AUT; 8	LUX; 7	JPN; 6	EUR; 8	10th	15
1998	Red Bull Sauber Petronas	Sauber C17	Petronas SPE-01D V10	AUS; 6	BRA; 11^{†}	ARG; Ret	SMR; Ret	ESP; 7	MON; 7	CAN; Ret	FRA; 8	GBR; Ret	AUT; 8	GER; Ret	HUN; 10	BEL; Ret	ITA; Ret	LUX; Ret	JPN; 10		15th	1
1999	HSBC Stewart Ford	Stewart SF3	Ford-Cosworth CR1 V10	AUS; DNS	BRA; Ret	SMR; 10^{†}	MON; Ret	ESP; Ret	CAN; 5	FRA; Ret	GBR; 12	AUT; 14	GER; 11^{†}	HUN; 11	BEL; Ret	ITA; Ret	EUR; 1	MAL; 4	JPN; 7		8th	15
2000	HSBC Jaguar Racing	Jaguar R1	Cosworth CR2 V10	AUS; Ret	BRA; Ret	SMR; 10	GBR; 12	ESP; 13	EUR; 11^{†}	MON; 9	CAN; Ret	FRA; Ret	AUT; 7	GER; Ret	HUN; Ret	BEL; 8	ITA; Ret	USA; 11	JPN; 7	MAL; Ret	NC	0

^{†} Driver did not finish the Grand Prix, but was classified as he completed over 90% of the race distance.

=== Complete Japanese Formula 3000 Championship results ===
(key) (Races in bold indicate pole position) (Races in italics indicate fastest lap)

Year	Entrant	1	2	3	4	5	6	7	8	9	10	11	DC	Points
1990	Team LeMans	SUZ; 19	FUJ; 10	MIN; Ret	SUZ; Ret	SUG; 7	FUJ; Ret	FUJ; 5	SUZ; 6	FUJ; Ret	SUZ; Ret		16th	3
1991	Team LeMans	SUZ; 5	AUT; 7	FUJ; Ret	MIN; 2	SUZ; Ret	SUG; Ret	FUJ; Ret	SUZ; 7	FUJ; C	SUZ; Ret	FUJ; 6	10th	9

=== 24 Hours of Le Mans results ===
Year	Team	Co-Drivers	Car	Class	Laps	Pos.	Class Pos.
1990	(Japan) Mazdaspeed	(Germany) Volker Weidler (Belgium) Bertrand Gachot	Mazda 787	GTP	148	DNF	DNF
1991	(Japan) Mazdaspeed	(Germany) Volker Weidler (Belgium) Bertrand Gachot	Mazda 787B	C2	362	**1st**	**1st**
1992	(Japan) Mazdaspeed (France) Oreca	(Germany) Volker Weidler (Belgium) Bertrand Gachot (Brazil) Maurizio Sandro Sala	Mazda MXR-01	C1	336	4th	4th
2001	(United States) Champion Racing	(Belgium) Didier Theys (Germany) Ralf Kelleners	Audi R8	LMP900	81	DNF	DNF
2002	(Germany) Audi Sport North America	(Italy) Christian Pescatori (Italy) Rinaldo Capello	Audi R8	LMP900	374	**2nd**	**2nd**
2003	(United Kingdom) Team Bentley	(United Kingdom) Mark Blundell (Australia) David Brabham	Bentley Speed 8	LMGTP	375	**2nd**	**2nd**
2004	(United Kingdom) Audi Sport UK Team Veloqx	(United Kingdom) Jamie Davies (United Kingdom) Guy Smith	Audi R8	LMP1	379	**2nd**	**2nd**
2007	(United Kingdom) Aston Martin Racing	(Netherlands) Peter Kox (Czech Republic) Tomáš Enge	Aston Martin DBR9	GT1	337	9th	4th

=== Complete American Le Mans Series results ===
Year	Entrant	Class	Chassis	Engine	1	2	3	4	5	6	7	8	9	10	Rank	Points	Ref
2001	Champion Racing	LMP900	Audi R8	Audi 3.6L Turbo V8	TEX	SEB	DON	JAR	SON; 4	POR; 3	MOS; Ret	MID; 5	MON; 2	PET; 3	8th	113	
2002	Audi Sport North America	LMP900	Audi R8	Audi 3.6L Turbo V8	SEB; 1										4th	206	
2002	Champion Racing	LMP900	Audi R8	Audi 3.6L Turbo V8		SON; 2	MID; 8	AME; 3	WAS; 5	TRO; 3	MOS; 2	MON; 2	MIA; 5	PET; 2	4th	206	
2003	Team Bentley	LMGTP	Bentley Speed 8	Bentley 4.0L Turbo V8	SEB; 3										4th	160	
2003	ADT Champion Racing	LMP900	Audi R8	Audi 3.6L Turbo V8		ATL; 1	SON; 2	TRO; 2	MOS; 4	AME; 1	MON; 3	MIA; 1	PET; 1		4th	160	
2004	Audi Sport UK Team Veloqx	LMP1	Audi R8	Audi 3.6L Turbo V8	SEB; 3	MID	LIM	SON	POR	MOS	AME				8th	64	
2004	ADT Champion Racing	LMP1	Audi R8	Audi 3.6L Turbo V8								PET; 2	MON; 1		8th	64	

=== Complete IndyCar Series results ===
(key) (Races in bold indicate pole position)

Year	Team	Chassis	No.	Engine	1	2	3	4	5	6	7	8	9	10	11	12	13	14	15	Rank	Points	Ref
2002	Duesenberg Brothers Racing	Dallara	32	Chevrolet	HMS	PHX	FON	NAZ	INDY; DNQ	TXS	PPIR	RIR	KAN	NSH	MCH	KTY	GAT	CHI	TXS	NC	0	

==== Indianapolis 500 results ====
Year	Chassis	Engine	Start	Finish	Team
2002	Dallara	Chevrolet	DNQ		Duesenberg

=== Complete Le Mans Endurance Series results ===
(key) (Races in bold indicate pole position; races in italics indicate fastest lap)

Year	Entrant	Class	Car	Engine	1	2	3	4	Pos.	Points
2004	Audi Sport UK Team Veloqx	LMP1	Audi R8	Audi 3.6L Turbo V8	**MNZ**; 1	NÜR; 2	SIL; 3	SPA; 1	1st	34

=== Complete British Touring Car Championship results ===
(key) (Races in bold indicate pole position – 1 point awarded just in first race) (Races in italics indicate fastest lap – 1 point awarded all races) (* signifies that driver lead race for at least one lap – 1 point awarded all races)

Year	Team	Car	1	2	3	4	5	6	7	8	9	10	11	12	13	14	15	16	17	18	19	20	21	22	23	24	25	26	27	28	29	30	Pos	Pts
2009	Team Dynamics	Honda Civic	BRH; 1	BRH; 2	BRH; 3	THR; 1	THR; 2	THR; 3	DON; 1	DON; 2	DON; 3	OUL; 1	OUL; 2	OUL; 3	CRO; 1	CRO; 2	CRO; 3	SNE; 1	SNE; 2	SNE; 3	KNO; 1	KNO; 2	KNO; 3	SIL; 1; 13	SIL; 2; 8	SIL; 3 Ret	ROC; 1 Ret	ROC; 2; 10	ROC; 3; 7	BRH; 1 Ret	BRH; 2 Ret	BRH; 3; 14	19th	8

=== Complete International Superstars Series results ===
(key) (Races in bold indicate pole position) (Races in italics indicate fastest lap)

Year	Team	Car	1	2	3	4	5	6	7	8	9	10	11	12	13	14	15	16	DC	Points	Ref
2010	Motorzone Race Car	Chevrolet Lumina CR8	MNZ; 1 Ret	MNZ; 2; 6	IMO; 1; 2	IMO; 2 DNS	ALG; 1 DNS	ALG; 2 Ret	HOC; 1; 14	HOC; 2; 3	CPR; 1; 3	CPR; 2; 15	VAL; 1 Ret	VAL; 2 Ret	KYA; 1; 1	KYA; 2 Ret			7th	66	
2011	Romeo Ferraris	Mercedes C63 AMG	MNZ; 1; 10	MNZ; 2 Ret	VNC; 1; 6	VNC; 2; 18	ALG; 1; 15	ALG; 2; 18	DON; 1; 2	DON; 2; 6	MIS; 1; 4	MIS; 2; 2	SPA; 1; 3	SPA; 2; 9	MUG; 1; 5	MUG; 2; 3	VAL; 1 Ret	VAL; 2; 5	6th	96	
2012	Swiss Team	Maserati Quattroporte	MNZ; 1	MNZ; 2	IMO; 1	IMO; 2	DON; 1; 3	DON; 2; 7	MUG; 1; 2	MUG; 2 Ret	HUN; 1	HUN; 2	SPA; 1	SPA; 2	VAL; 1	VAL; 2	PER; 1	PER; 2	12th	36	

== Helmet ==
Herbert's helmet design was red with a white line going from the rear through the sides and onto the mouthplate, black stripes on the lower sides and a black stripe on the rear (in a similar fashion to Patrick Depailler's helmet), in 1999, when he drove for Stewart, the stripes on the lower sides were changed to green and on the top of the helmet was added a drop with the union jack. In 2000, when he drove for Jaguar, the green areas became blue.

Sporting positions
Preceded by Gerrit van Kouwen	Formula Ford Festival; Winner; 1985	Succeeded by Roland Ratzenberger
Preceded by Andy Wallace	British Formula Three Champion; 1987	Succeeded by JJ Lehto
Preceded by John Nielsen; Price Cobb; Martin Brundle	Winner of the 24 Hours of Le Mans; 1991; With: Volker Weidler & Bertrand Gachot	Succeeded by Derek Warwick; Yannick Dalmas; Mark Blundell
Preceded by Gabriele Tarquini	Formula One Indoor Trophy winner 1992	Succeeded by Rubens Barrichello
Preceded by Inaugural	Le Mans Series; Champion; 2004; With: Jamie Davies	Succeeded by Jean-Christophe Boullion; Emmanuel Collard
Preceded by Inaugural	Speedcar Series; Champion; 2008	Succeeded by Gianni Morbidelli
Awards and achievements
Preceded by Andy Wallace	Autosport; National Racing Driver of the Year; 1987	Succeeded by JJ Lehto
