= Lotus 109 =

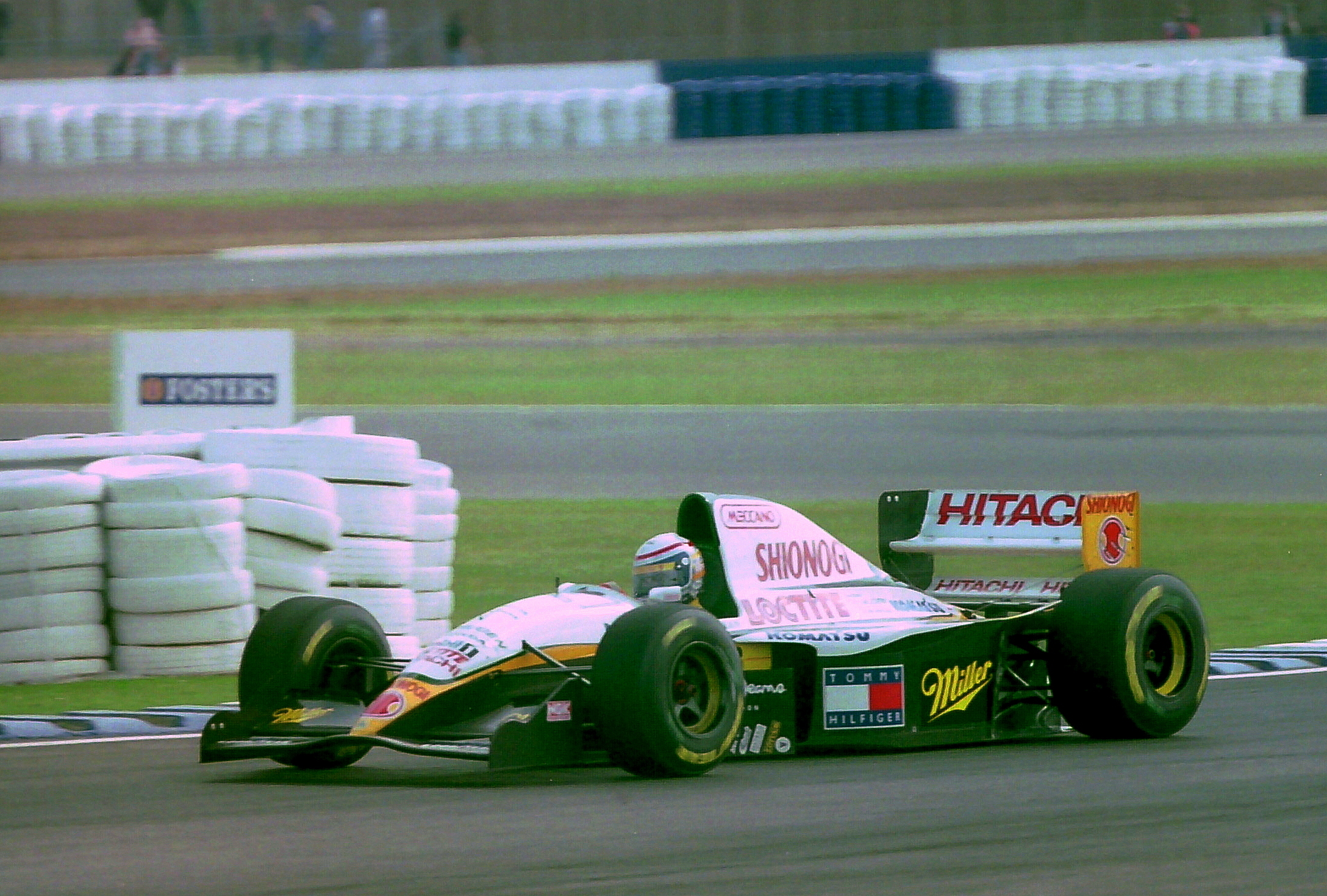
- Alessandro Zanardi driving the 109 at the 1994 British Grand Prix
- Category: Formula One
- Constructor: Lotus
- Designers: Peter Wright (Technical Director); Chris Murphy (Chief Designer); Jean-Paul Gousset (Design Office Coordinator); Mark Hennings (Head of Aerodynamics); Tenji Sakai (Engine Chief Designer - Mugen Honda)
- Predecessor: 107C
- Successor: 112 (never raced)

Technical specifications
- Chassis: Carbon fibre monocoque
- Suspension (front): Double wishbones, pushrod
- Suspension (rear): Double wishbones, pushrod
- Axle track: Front: 1,650 mm (65 in); Rear: 1,600 mm (63 in)
- Wheelbase: 2,950 mm (116 in)
- Engine: Mugen-Honda MF-351HD, 3,500 cc (213.6 cu in), V10, NA, mid-engine, longitudinally-mounted
- Transmission: Lotus / Xtrac 6-speed semi-automatic
- Power: 725 hp @ 13,500 rpm
- Weight: 515 kg (1,135 lb)
- Fuel: Mobil 1
- Tyres: Goodyear

Competition history
- Notable entrants: Team Lotus
- Notable drivers: 11. (Italy) Alessandro Zanardi; 11. (Belgium) Philippe Adams; 11. (France) Éric Bernard; 11. (Finland) Mika Salo; 12. (United Kingdom) Johnny Herbert; 12. (Italy) Alessandro Zanardi
- Debut: 1994 Spanish Grand Prix
- Last event: 1994 Australian Grand Prix
Races	Wins	Podiums	Poles	F/Laps
12	0	0	0	0
- Constructors' Championships: 0
- Drivers' Championships: 0

The Lotus 109 was a Formula One car used by Team Lotus in the latter part of the 1994 Formula One season. This was the last car to be run by the original incarnation of Team Lotus, and was based on the Lotus 107C model.

Johnny Herbert was able to keep Lotus competitive in Belgium and Monza with the car, but funds were drying up and development was limited. At the end of the season, the car was retired and Team Lotus went into receivership.

== Complete Formula One results ==
(key)

Year	Entrant	Engine	Tyres	Drivers	1	2	3	4	5	6	7	8	9	10	11	12	13	14	15	16	Points	WCC
1994	Team Lotus	Mugen-Honda V10	G		BRA	PAC	SMR	MON	ESP	CAN	FRA	GBR	GER	HUN	BEL	ITA	POR	EUR	JPN	AUS	0	-
1994	Team Lotus	Mugen-Honda V10	G	Johnny Herbert					Ret	8	7	11	Ret	Ret	12	Ret	13				0	-
1994	Team Lotus	Mugen-Honda V10	G	Alessandro Zanardi							Ret	Ret	Ret	13		Ret		16	13	Ret	0	-
1994	Team Lotus	Mugen-Honda V10	G	Philippe Adams											Ret		16				0	-
1994	Team Lotus	Mugen-Honda V10	G	Éric Bernard														18			0	-
1994	Team Lotus	Mugen-Honda V10	G	Mika Salo															10	Ret	0	-
