= Capital Karts =

Go karting track in London, England

Coordinates: 51.5052°N 0.0214°W

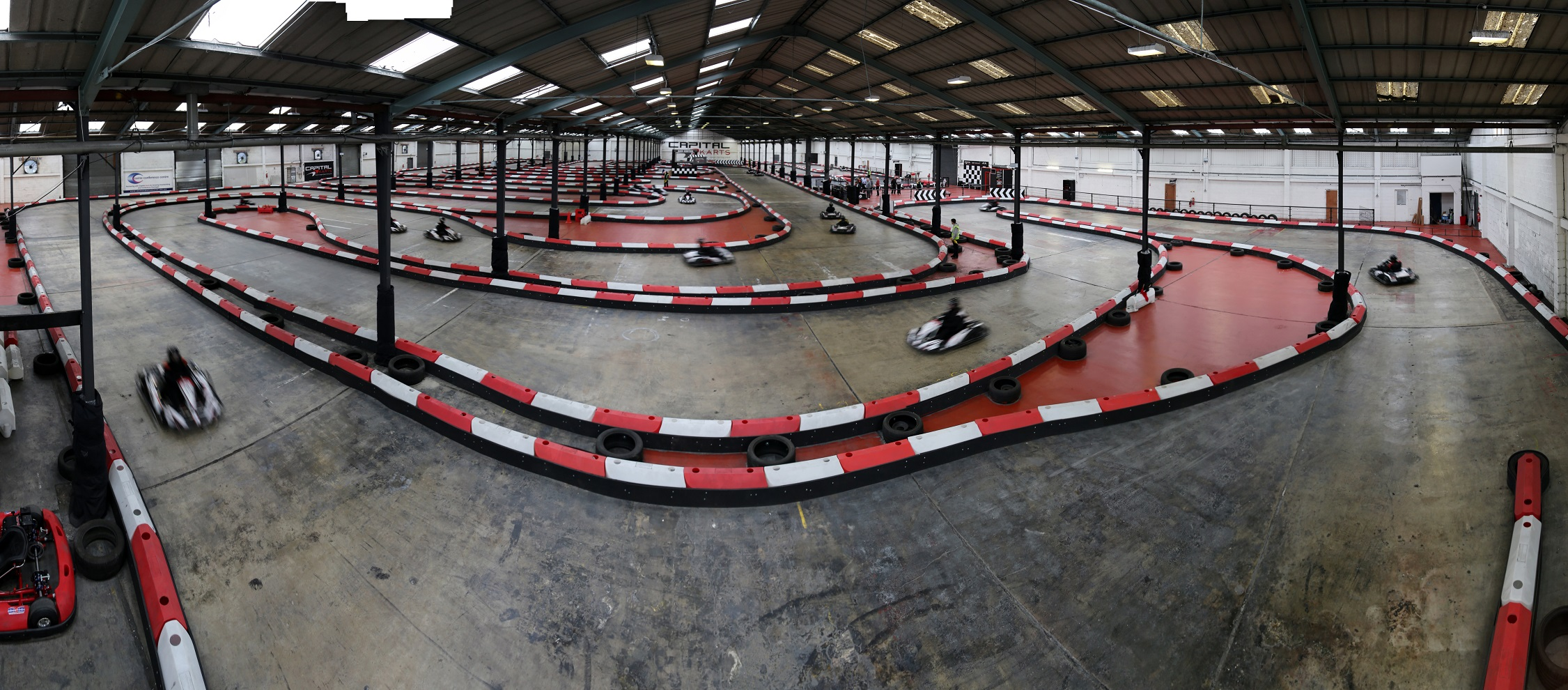
Capital Karts track in Barking

Capital Karts is an indoor go karting track..

Established in 2013 by co-founders Matthew Holyfield and Alastair Flynn in a derelict warehouse near Barking, the Capital Karts track was seeing over 500 visitors each weekend and had an annual turnover of £2m within 2 years. Its former site in Barking was the largest indoor track in the UK at over 1,050 metres (3,440 ft) long and had won multiple awards.

== Tracks ==
The Capital Karts track on Rippleside in East London was 1,050m long and underwent refurbishment in 2016 to increase average track speed, improve overtaking opportunities, and further enhance the safety barrier system. The karts reached top speeds of 45 mph and a lap took approximately 70 seconds to complete. There were 20 corners and the track had an average width of 8 metres (26 ft).

A child died at the Barking site in August 2021 after her headscarf became caught in the kart she was driving. An inquest found that the kart "should not have been driven", and expressed concerns about the adequacy of checks on clothing performed by marshals. Capital Karts no longer lists the Barking track on its website.

Capital Karts had a track the Canary Wharf area of London, with a Birmingham site is opening in 2025.

Acquisition by K1 Speed In May 2024, K1 Speed Inc.—a well-known US-based indoor electric go-karting operator—acquired Capital Karts. This marked K1 Speed’s entry into the UK market, The Canary Wharf location remains active and has been rebranded as K1 Speed Canary Wharf, That means: although the name Capital Karts may no longer be front-and-centre, the venue continues to operate—now under the K1 Speed brand, offering indoor electric go-karting in Canary Wharf.

== Karting Challenge ==
The Johnny Herbert Karting Challenge has been held at the Capital Karts track since 2013. More than 100 drivers compete in a 3-hour endurance race with charitable donations being raised by teams, and additional donations raised during the trackside sale of racing memorabilia. The event raised more than £10,000 in its first year. In April 2014, bookmakers Ladbrokes filmed their betting advert at the Capital Karts track.

== The Karts ==
RiMO Alpha karts used at Capital Karts feature a 270cc Honda LPG tuned engine. The same karts are used in karting tracks around Europe

The karts are suitable for adults, children and disabled visitors, and there are karts that are equipped for use by two people.

== Awards ==
Since its inception in 2013, Capital Karts has won a number of awards.

- 2014 Barking and Dagenham New Business Of The Year
- 2015 East London New Business Of The Year
- 2015 Karting Magazine Indoor Track Of The Year
- 2015 TripAdvisor Certificate of Excellence
- 2016 TripAdvisor Certificate of Excellence
