= Lotus 112 =

- Category: Formula One
- Constructor: Lotus
- Designer: Chris Murphy
- Predecessor: 109

Technical specifications
- Chassis: Carbon fibre and aluminium monocoque
- Suspension (front): Double wishbones, pushrod
- Suspension (rear): Double wishbones, pushrod
- Axle track: Front: 1,650 mm (65 in); Rear: 1,600 mm (63 in)
- Wheelbase: 2,950 mm (116 in)
- Engine: Mugen-Honda MF-351HC, 2,998 cc (182.9 cu in), V10, NA, mid-engine, longitudinally mounted
- Transmission: Lotus / Xtrac 6-speed semi-automatic
- Fuel: Mobil 1
- Tyres: Goodyear

Competition history
- Notable entrants: Team Lotus
Races	Wins	Podiums	Poles	F/Laps
0	0	0	0	0
- Constructors' Championships: 0
- Drivers' Championships: 0

The Lotus 112 was the proposed 1995 Formula One car of Team Lotus.

== Conception ==
The Lotus 112 was Team Lotus' planned entry to the 1995 Formula One season. It was a stillborn project conceived by chief designer Chris Murphy throughout their final Formula One campaign in 1994. Originally the designation of Type 112 was to be for the model that became the Lotus Elise. However, that car was given type number 111 instead, in homage to the original Lotus Eleven.

As a project little had been confirmed about the car’s final specification. It was rumoured that Lotus were intending to include the promising higher-spec Mugen-Honda ZA5D engine, which had shown great promise at its first outing during the 1994 Italian Grand Prix at Monza. However, in an attempt to reduce the costs associated with an exclusive engine deal Lotus may have had to use a Ford (Cosworth) unit.

Team Lotus were planning to retain their final 1994 driver line-up of Alessandro Zanardi and Mika Salo.

In appearance the 112 was broadly similar to other Chris Murphy-designed Lotuses. It incorporated a new and distinctive arrow nose and an unusual pushrod arrangement on the front suspension. Despite this radical departure, the car’s construction retained certain characteristic hallmarks. The tub would have been constructed from the traditional Lotus composite of carbon aluminium honeycomb, with the bodyshell being processed out of carbon fibre. A scale model for wind tunnel testing was produced which was later to be found in the aeronautical engineering department of City University. Wind tunnel tests were promising, with the car producing a lot more downforce compared to the 109. The 112 also passed the mandated FIA crash tests.

== Team Lotus demise ==
On 17 January 1995 new owner David Hunt (younger brother of 1976 world champion James) was forced to close down Team Lotus in the face of crippling debt and lack of sponsorship for the forthcoming season.

The Lotus 112 therefore became the last Team Lotus type designation.

David Hunt effectively merged what was left of Team Lotus with Pacific Grand Prix with that team renamed Pacific Team Lotus for 1995. The season was unsuccessful with Pacific also going under at the end of the year.
