= Michael Schumacher =

German racing driver (born 1969)

Michael Schumacher OMRI
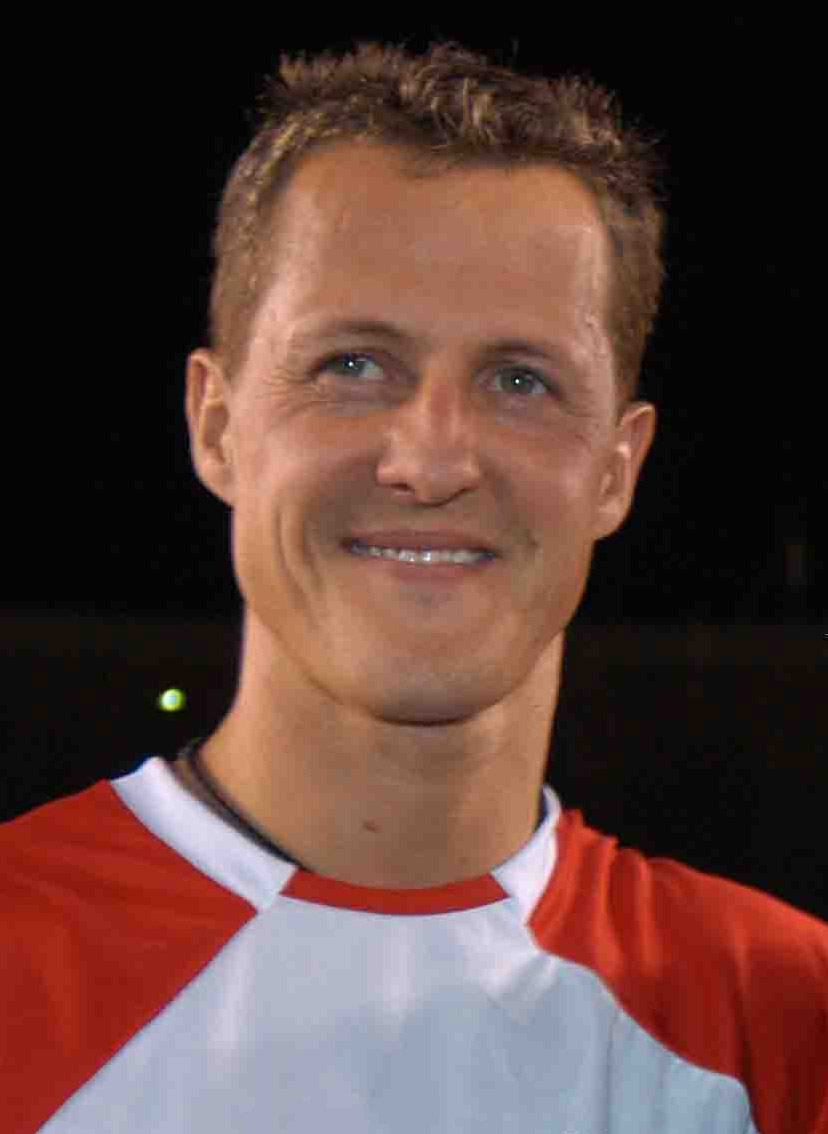
- Schumacher in 2005
- Born: 3 January 1969 (age 57); Hürth, North Rhine-Westphalia, West Germany
- Spouse: Corinna Betsch (m. 1995)
- Children: Gina-Maria; Mick
- Relatives: Ralf Schumacher (brother); Cora Schumacher (sister-in-law); David Schumacher (nephew)
- Awards: Full list

Formula One World Championship career
- Nationality: (Germany) German
- Active years: 1991–2006, 2010–2012
- Team(s): Jordan, Benetton, Ferrari, Mercedes
- Entries: 308 (306 starts)
- Championships: 7 (1994, 1995, 2000, 2001, 2002, 2003, 2004)
- Wins: 91
- Podiums: 155
- Career points: 1566
- Pole positions: 68
- Fastest laps: 77
- First entry: 1991 Belgian Grand Prix
- First win: 1992 Belgian Grand Prix
- Last win: 2006 Chinese Grand Prix
- Last entry: 2012 Brazilian Grand Prix

24 Hours of Le Mans career
- Years: 1991
- Teams: Sauber
- Best finish: 5th (1991)
- Class wins: 0

Michael Schumacher (German: [ˈmɪçaʔeːl ˈʃuːmaxɐ]; born 3 January 1969) is a German former racing driver who competed in Formula One from 1991 to 2006 and from 2010 to 2012. Schumacher won a record-setting seven Formula One World Drivers' Championship titles, tied by Lewis Hamilton in 2020, and—at the time of his retirement—held the records for most wins (91), pole positions (68), and podium finishes (155), while he maintains the record for most fastest laps (77), among others.

Born in Hürth to a working-class family, Schumacher began competitive kart racing at age four in a pedal kart built from discarded parts. After a successful karting career—culminating in his victory at the European Championship in 1987—Schumacher graduated to junior formulae. He dominated Formula König in his debut season, before graduating to German Formula Three in 1989, where he finished third. He won the title in 1990, also claiming the Macau Grand Prix and becoming a race-winner in the World Sportscar Championship with Sauber Mercedes. Schumacher made his debut Formula One appearance with Jordan at the Belgian Grand Prix in 1991; his qualifying performance saw Benetton sign him for the remainder of the season. In 1992, he achieved his maiden victory in Belgium amongst several podiums, which he repeated at the Portuguese Grand Prix in 1993. Schumacher won his maiden World Drivers' Championship with eight victories in 1994, following a collision with his rival Damon Hill at the last race of the season. He won a further nine Grands Prix as he defended his title in 1995.

Schumacher moved to the struggling Ferrari for his 1996 campaign, where he took several victories and finished third overall. He was involved in title battles in 1997 and 1998, being disqualified from the former for a collision with Jacques Villeneuve and finishing runner-up to Mika Häkkinen in the latter. His rivalry with Häkkinen continued into 1999, when Schumacher broke his leg following a brake failure whilst second in the championship. He returned to beat Häkkinen to his first title with Ferrari in 2000, their first in 21 years, which he successfully defended in 2001. His 2002 campaign—during which he won a then-record 11 Grands Prix—saw him claim a record-equalling fifth title with an unparalleled perfect podium rate. He then claimed his unprecedented sixth and seventh titles in 2003 and 2004, holding off Kimi Räikkönen and Juan Pablo Montoya in the former before winning 13 of 18 Grands Prix during the latter, breaking several further records. After dropping to third in 2005 and narrowly finishing runner-up to Fernando Alonso in 2006, Schumacher announced his retirement from Formula One. He later returned with the resurrected Mercedes from 2010 to 2012, claiming his final podium at the latter European Grand Prix, and has been credited with elevating the project to championship-winning form.

Schumacher was noted for pushing his machinery to the limit for sustained periods, as well as his pioneering fitness regimen, win-at-all-costs mentality, and ability to galvanise teams around him. Appointed a UNESCO Champion for Sport in 2002, Schumacher has been involved in several humanitarian projects and has donated over US$65 million to various charities. In December 2013, Schumacher suffered a traumatic brain injury in a skiing accident and was placed in an induced coma for six months. He received further rehabilitation in Lausanne before being relocated to receive private treatment at his home in September 2014; he has not appeared publicly since.

== Early life and career ==
=== Family ===
Schumacher was born in the West German town of Hürth, North Rhine-Westphalia, on 3 January 1969, into a working-class family. His father Rolf was a bricklayer who later ran the local kart track, while his mother Elisabeth operated the track's canteen.

=== Karting ===
When Schumacher was four, his father modified his pedal kart by adding a small motorcycle engine. After he crashed it into a lamp post in Kerpen, his parents took him to the karting track at Kerpen-Horrem, where he became the youngest member of the karting club. His father built him a kart from discarded parts; at the age of six, Schumacher won his first club championship. To support his racing, Schumacher's father took on a second job renting and repairing karts, while his mother worked at the track's canteen. When Schumacher needed a new engine costing 800 DM, his parents were unable to afford it; he was able to continue racing with support from local businessmen.

Regulations in Germany require a driver to be at least 14 years old to obtain a kart license. To circumvent this, Schumacher obtained a license in Luxembourg at the age of 12. In 1983, he obtained his German license, a year after he won the German Junior Kart Championship. Schumacher joined Eurokart dealer Adolf Neubert in 1985 and won the direct-drive Karting European Championship (ICA). By 1987, he was the German and European kart champion, and quit school to begin working as a mechanic. Upon clinching his second World Drivers' Championship, Schumacher returned to top-level karting in 1996, winning both the Monaco Kart Cup in Formula A and the Masters of Paris-Bercy.

=== Lower formulae and sportscar racing ===
In 1988, Schumacher moved into single-seat car racing by participating in the German Formula Ford and Formula König series, winning the latter. In 1989, Schumacher signed with Willi Weber's WTS Formula Three team. Funded by Weber, he competed in the German Formula Three Championship, winning the 1990 German Formula Three Championship. He also won the 1990 Macau Grand Prix under controversial circumstances. He placed second behind Mika Häkkinen in the first heat, three seconds behind. When the second heat began, he passed Häkkinen, who needed to finish within three seconds of Schumacher to win the race overall. In the closing laps, Schumacher made a mistake, allowing Häkkinen to attempt to overtake. As soon as Schumacher changed his line, Häkkinen followed suit, attempting to pass him, and then crashed into the rear of Schumacher's car. While Häkkinen's race was ended, Schumacher drove to victory without a rear wing. Schumacher gave the prize money from winning the race to his family as they had debts.

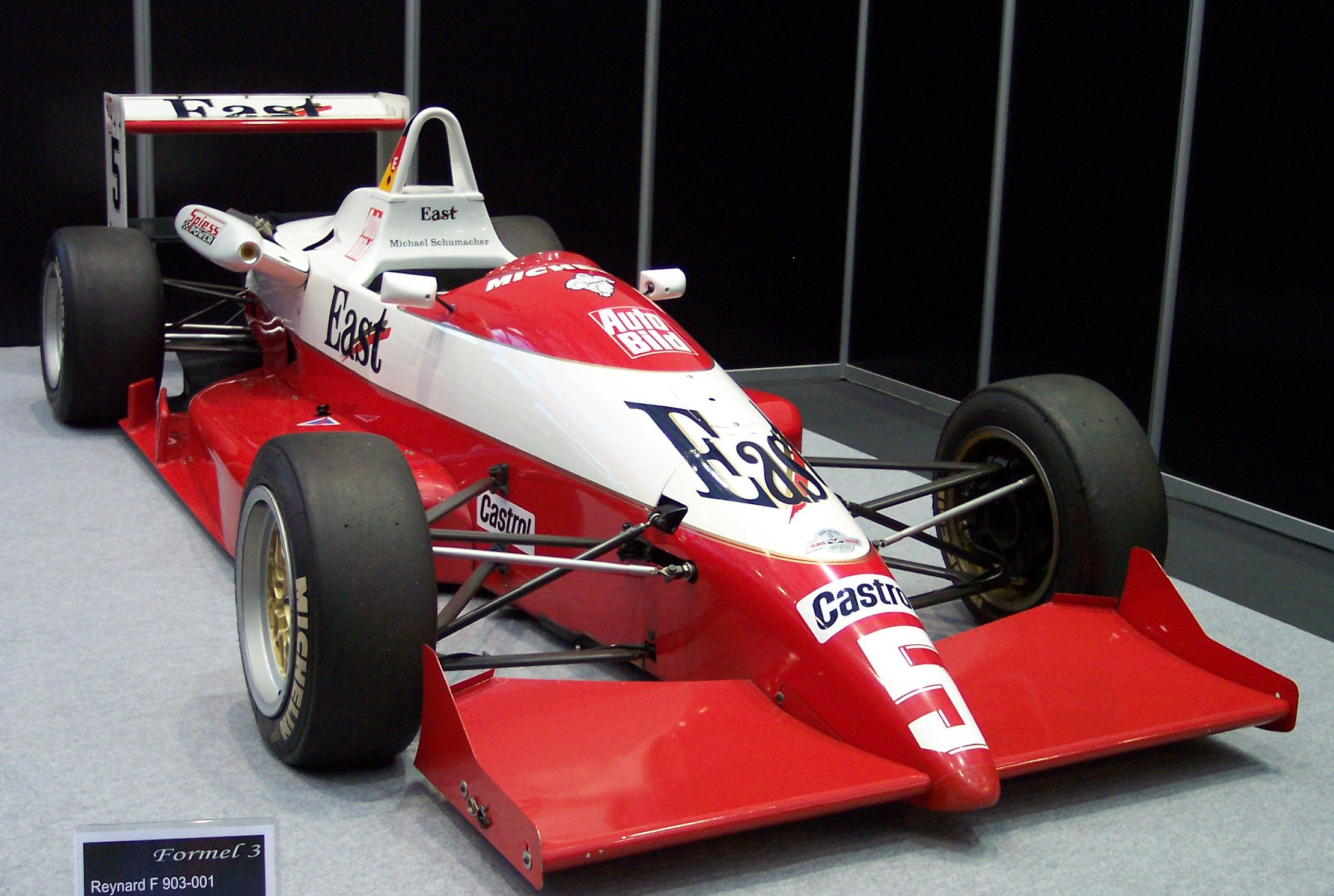
Schumacher's title-winning German Formula Three car from 1990

During 1990, along with his Formula Three rivals Heinz-Harald Frentzen and Karl Wendlinger, Schumacher joined the Mercedes-Benz junior racing programme in the World Sportscar Championship. This was unusual for a young driver, as most of Schumacher's contemporaries competed in Formula 3000 on the way to Formula One. Weber advised Schumacher that being exposed to professional press conferences and driving powerful cars in long-distance races would help his career.

In the 1990 World Sportscar Championship season, Schumacher won the season finale at the Autódromo Hermanos Rodríguez in a Sauber–Mercedes C11, and finished fifth in the Drivers' Championship despite only driving in three of the nine races. He continued with the team in the 1991 World Sportscar Championship season, winning again at the final race of the season at Autopolis in Japan with a Sauber–Mercedes-Benz C291, leading to a ninth-place finish in the Drivers' Championship. He also competed at the 1991 24 Hours of Le Mans, finishing fifth in a car shared with Wendlinger and Fritz Kreutzpointner. He further competed in one race in the 1991 Japanese Formula 3000 Championship, finishing second.

During the 1991 430 km of Nürburgring, Schumacher was involved in an incident with Derek Warwick. Schumacher lost time in qualifying after encountering Warwick's Jaguar XJR-14 on a slow lap while attempting to set his flying lap. As retaliation for Warwick impeding him, Schumacher swerved his Sauber into the Jaguar, hitting the front wheel and nose. Enraged by Schumacher's attitude, Warwick drove to the pits and chased Schumacher on foot. He eventually caught up with Schumacher, and his teammate Jochen Mass and several mechanics intervened to prevent Warwick from physically assaulting Schumacher.

== Formula One career ==
=== Jordan (1991) ===
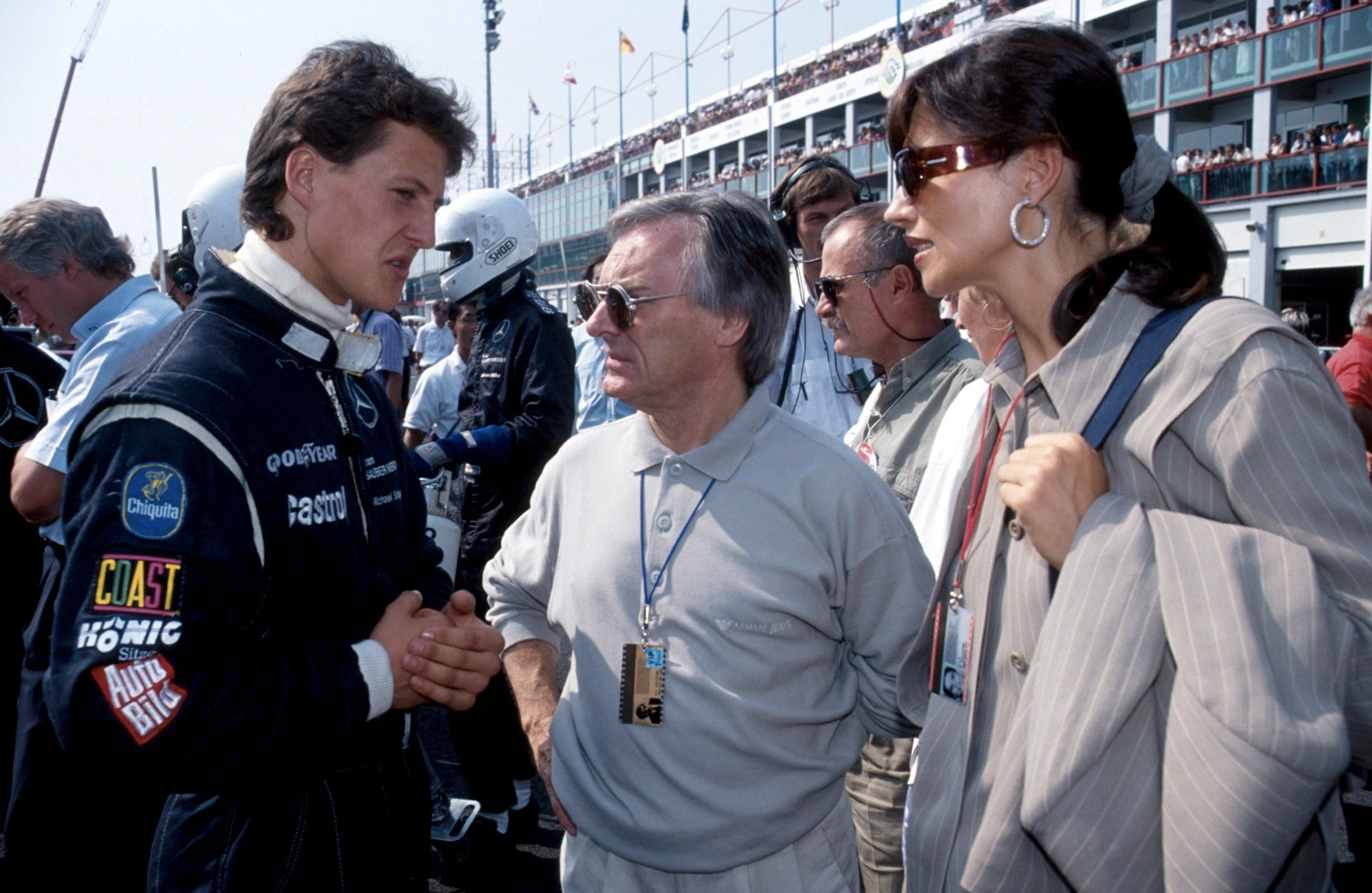
Schumacher (left) in 1991, the year he joined Formula One

Schumacher made his Formula One debut with the Irish Jordan-Ford team at the Belgian Grand Prix, driving car number 32 as a replacement for the imprisoned Bertrand Gachot. Schumacher, still a contracted Mercedes driver, was signed by Eddie Jordan after Mercedes paid Jordan $150,000 for his debut.

The week before the race, Schumacher impressed Jordan designer Gary Anderson and team manager Trevor Foster during a test drive at the Silverstone Circuit. Despite having only spectated the challenging Spa-Francorchamps Circuit, Schumacher's manager Weber reassured Jordan that Schumacher knew it well. During the race weekend, teammate Andrea de Cesaris could not show Schumacher the circuit because he was delayed by contract negotiations. Schumacher then rode a foldable bike around the track to become familiar with it on his own.

Schumacher impressed the paddock in his debut, qualifying seventh in the midfield Jordan 191 car, which he tested for half a day, at a circuit where he had never raced. This also matched the team's season-best grid position, and Schumacher outqualified de Cesaris. Motor Sport journalist Joe Saward reported that, after qualifying, "clumps of German journalists were talking about 'the best talent since Stefan Bellof'". Schumacher retired on the race's first lap with clutch problems.

=== Benetton (1991–1995) ===
Following his Belgian Grand Prix debut, despite an agreement in principle between Jordan and Schumacher's Mercedes management that would see the German race for the Irish team for the remainder of the season, Schumacher was engaged by Benetton-Ford for the next race. Jordan applied for an injunction in the British courts to prevent Schumacher driving for Benetton but lost the case as they had not yet signed a final contract.

==== 1991–1993: Maiden points, podiums, and wins ====
Schumacher finished the 1991 season with four points out of six races. His best finish was fifth in his second race, the Italian Grand Prix, in which he finished ahead of his teammate and three-time World Champion Nelson Piquet. He also outqualified Piquet four times out of five in the season run-in, scoring only half a point less than him during their time together.

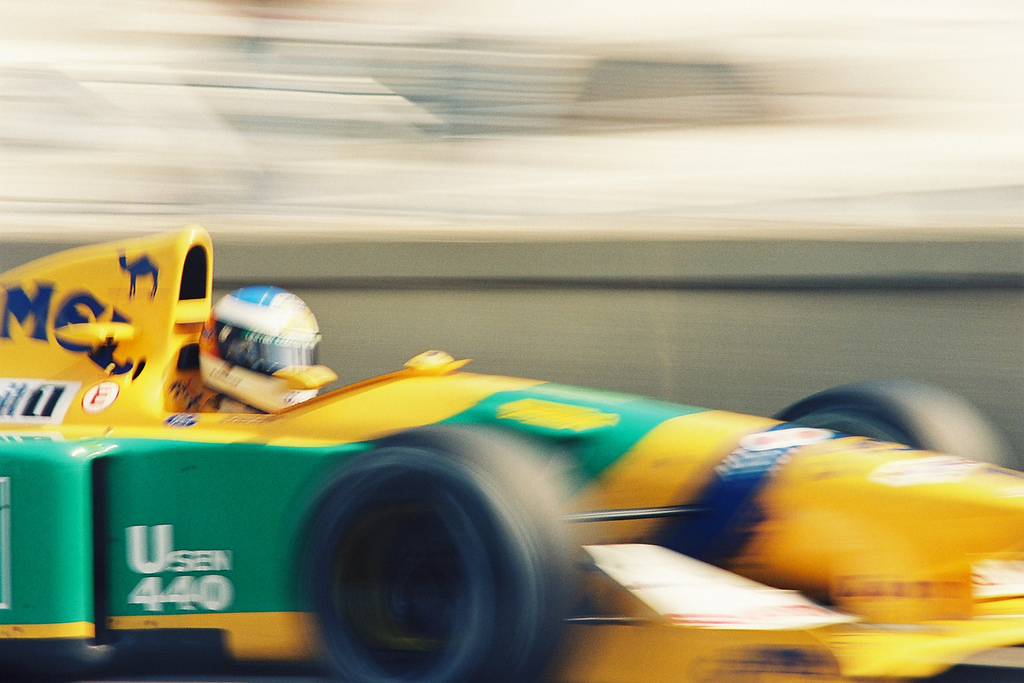
Schumacher driving for Benetton at the Monaco Grand Prix. In 1992, he achieved the first of his 91 wins.

At the start of the 1992 season the Sauber team, planning their Formula One debut with Mercedes backing for the following year, invoked a clause in Schumacher's contract that stated that if Mercedes entered Formula One, Schumacher would drive for them. It was eventually agreed that Schumacher would stay with Benetton; Peter Sauber stated that "[Schumacher] didn't want to drive for us. Why would I have forced him?" The year was dominated by the Williams FW14B of Nigel Mansell and Riccardo Patrese, featuring powerful Renault engines, semi-automatic gearboxes, and active suspension to control the car's ride height. In the conventional Benetton B192, Schumacher finished third in the Mexican Grand Prix, his first podium finish. Through what has been described as a tactical masterstroke, he went on to take his first victory at the Belgian Grand Prix, in a wet race at the Spa-Francorchamps Circuit, which by 2003 he would call "far and away my favourite track". That also marked as the last Formula One car to win a Grand Prix while sporting a H-pattern manual gearbox.

From the 1992 Portuguese Grand Prix to the 1998 Monaco Grand Prix, Schumacher was not beaten by his teammate when both cars finished. The year 1992 was also the first of many times that Schumacher beat his teammate through a full season, and Martin Brundle was fired as a result. Benetton team boss Flavio Briatore later regretted this decision, saying that he had underestimated the ability of both his drivers. Schumacher finished third in the Drivers' Championship in 1992 with 53 points, three points behind runner-up Patrese and three in front of the Brazilian Ayrton Senna. According to Jo Ramírez, a close friend of Senna, the Brazilian considered Schumacher "the next big threat, way ahead of all the other drivers around at the time".

The Williams FW15C of Damon Hill and Alain Prost dominated the 1993 season as well. Benetton introduced their own active suspension and traction control early in the season, last of the frontrunning teams to do so. Schumacher won one race, the Portuguese Grand Prix where he beat Prost, and had nine podium finishes; he retired in seven of the other 16 races. He finished the season in fourth, with 52 points, beating Patrese as teammate, so much so that Briatore and his team thought that Patrese was washed up and that they had no problem with their car.

==== 1994–1995: Back-to-back World Championships ====
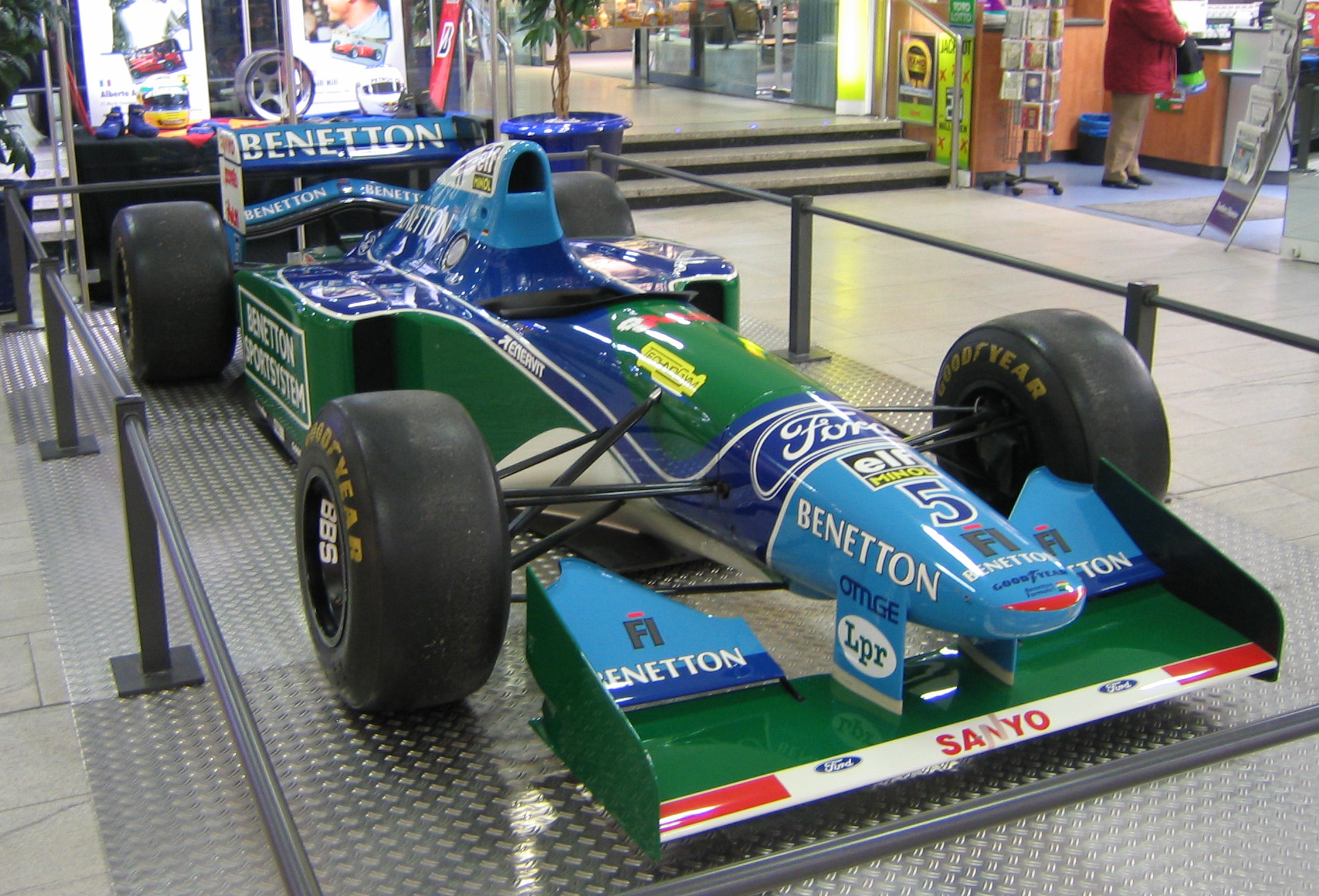
Schumacher drove the Benetton B194 to his first World Championship in 1994.

Schumacher won his first Drivers' Championship in 1994. Driving the Benetton B194, which has been called the worst car to have won a Formula One World Championship and was difficult to drive, so much so that Schumacher had three different teammates (JJ Lehto, Jos Verstappen, and Johnny Herbert) due to crashes, Schumacher won the first four races and finished the season with eight wins. He won six of the first seven races, including the Brazilian Grand Prix in which he lapped the entire field, and was leading the Spanish Grand Prix, before a gearbox failure left him stuck in fifth gear for most of the race. Schumacher made two pit stops without stalling and finished the race in second place. Benetton boss Flavio Briatore stated that Schumacher's drive was one of the best he had ever seen. The 1994 season was marred by the death of Ayrton Senna, which was witnessed by Schumacher who was directly behind Senna, and that of Roland Ratzenberger during the San Marino Grand Prix; there were also allegations of cheating during the 1994 Formula One season involving several teams, most particularly Schumacher's Benetton, having allegedly broken the sport's technical regulations.

Following the San Marino Grand Prix, the Benetton, Ferrari, and McLaren teams were investigated on suspicion of breaking the FIA-imposed ban on electronic aids. Benetton and McLaren initially refused to hand over their source code for investigation. When they did so, the FIA discovered hidden functionality in both teams' software but no evidence that it had been used in a race. Both teams were fined $100,000 for their initial refusal to cooperate. The McLaren software, which was a gearbox program that allowed automatic shifts, was deemed legal. By contrast, the Benetton software was deemed to be a form of launch control that would have allowed Schumacher to make perfect starts, which was explicitly outlawed by the regulations; Benetton and Willem Toet, a Formula One aerodynamicist for over thirty years who worked at Benetton until 1994, stated that traction control was legally achieved through rotational inertia. There was no evidence to suggest the software was used.

At the British Grand Prix, Schumacher was penalised for overtaking Hill on the formation lap. He and Benetton then ignored the penalty and the subsequent black flag, which indicates that the driver must immediately return to the pits, for which he was disqualified and later given a two-race ban. Benetton blamed the incident on a communication error between the stewards and the team. Schumacher was also disqualified after winning the Belgian Grand Prix, after his car was found to have illegal wear on its skid block, a measure used after the accidents at the Imola Circuit to limit downforce and hence cornering speed. Benetton protested that the skid block had been damaged when Schumacher spun over a kerb; the FIA rejected their appeal because of the pattern of wear and damage visible on the block. The two-race ban punishment was seen by many observers as petty and insignificant, and that it was a result of Benetton's feud with the FIA, with Schumacher being a victim and the FIA trying to deny him his first World Championship.

These incidents helped Hill close the points gap, and Schumacher led by a single point going into the final race at the Australian Grand Prix. On lap 36, Schumacher hit the guardrail on the outside of the track while leading. Hill attempted to pass but as Schumacher's car returned to the track there was a collision on the corner causing them both to retire. As a result, Schumacher won the Drivers' Championship, the first German to do so—Jochen Rindt (the only posthumous Drivers' Champion) was German but raced under the Austrian flag, and whose domination in 1970 was later equalled by Schumacher. The race stewards judged it as a racing accident and took no action against either driver. Although the Drivers' Championship had been decided in a similar manner in 1989 and 1990, public opinion was divided over the incident, and Schumacher was vilified in the British media. At the FIA conference after the race, Schumacher dedicated his title to Senna.

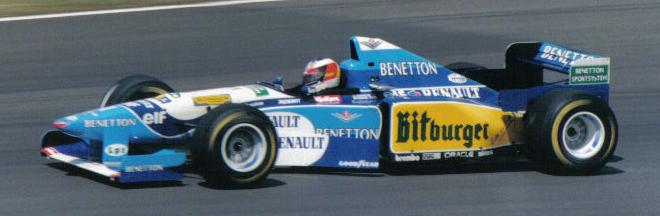
Schumacher driving for Benetton in 1995 at the British Grand Prix. That year, he won his second World Championship.

In 1995, Schumacher successfully defended his title with Benetton, which now had the same Renault engine as Williams; according to observers, including Peter Wright, Benetton had the better team while Williams had the superior car. Schumacher accumulated 33 more points than second-placed Hill. With Herbert as teammate, he took Benetton to its first Constructors' Championship, breaking the dominance of McLaren and Williams, and became the youngest two-time World Champion in Formula One history. The season was marred by several collisions with Hill, in particular an overtaking manoeuvre by Hill took them both out of the British Grand Prix on lap 45, and again on lap 23 of the Italian Grand Prix; it also saw one of his career's best overtakes, with the one over Jean Alesi giving him the win at the European Grand Prix, after he reduced the half a minute gap in the final dozen laps.

Schumacher won 9 of the 17 races, including the French Grand Prix, and finished on the podium 11 times. It was only once that he qualify worse than fourth; at the Belgian Grand Prix, he qualified 16th but nevertheless went on to win the wet-dry race, finishing 16 seconds ahead of Hill, with whom he had ferocious wheel-to-wheel racing and involved some crucial strategic calls. His bad qualifying was a result of a crash he had in the final free practice, and by the time his car was rebuilt, it had started to rain; this ended his 56-race streak of outqualifying his teammates that started in 1992, after he missed a gear in qualifying in Australian Grand Prix and was outqualified by Piquet. Piquet himself had a 36-race streak, which lasted from 1979 through 1982, and Schumacher had broken Senna's record of 44 consecutive qualifying sessions from 1985 to 1988.

=== Ferrari (1996–2006) ===
"You remember when I left Benetton, and [Jean] Alesi and [Gerhard] Berger took their first steps in that Benetton? You remember how many crashes they had? ... I mean, that car was really unbelievable. Really difficult to drive. It was so edgy. But it was fast when you just drove it exactly on that edge. Now, though, there have been a lot of aerodynamic improvements to the cars and so the cars I have driven have been a lot more stable. And that applies to most of the cars today."

— Schumacher in a 1999 interview with Damon Hill

In 1996, Schumacher joined Ferrari, a team that had last won the Drivers' Championship in 1979 and the Constructors' Championship in 1983, for a salary of $60 million over two years. He left Benetton a year before his contract with them expired; he later cited the team's damaging actions in 1994 as his reason for opting out of his deal. In 1997, Schumacher lured Benetton employees Rory Byrne (designer) and Ross Brawn (technical director) to Ferrari. Ferrari had previously come close to the championship in 1982 and 1990. The team had suffered a disastrous downturn in the early 1990s, partially as its famous V12 engine was no longer competitive against the smaller, lighter, and more fuel-efficient V10s of its competitors. Various drivers, notably Prost, had given the vehicles disparaging labels, such as "truck", "pig", and "accident waiting to happen". Furthermore, the poor performance of the Ferrari pit crews was considered a running joke.

At the end of 1995, although Ferrari had improved into a solid competitor, it was still considered inferior to front-running teams like Benetton and Williams. Schumacher declared the Ferrari F310 good enough to win a championship, although afterwards his teammate Eddie Irvine labelled the F310 "an awful car", a "piece of junk", and "almost undriveable", while designer John Barnard admitted that the car "wasn't very good". Irvine also later commented: "The '96 [Ferrari] car was a disaster and was nearly undriveable. Only someone of Michael Schumacher's ability—and maybe Senna—could have driven it." During winter testing, Schumacher first drove a Ferrari, their 1995 Ferrari 412 T2, and was two seconds faster than former regulars Alesi and Gerhard Berger had been. Alesi and Berger were allowed to drive Schumacher's Benetton B195 with which he won the World Championship in 1995, and they could not believe how Schumacher had won with it, calling it "the ugly duckling" for being so terrible to drive and being prone to crashes.

==== 1996–1999: World Championship challenges and injury ====
"It was not a race. It was a demonstration of brilliance."

— Stirling Moss about Schumacher at the 1996 Spanish Grand Prix

In 1996, Schumacher finished third in the Drivers' Championship and helped Ferrari to second place in the Constructors' Championship ahead of his old team Benetton. During the season, the car had reliability problems; Schumacher did not finish in 7 of the 16 races. At the French Grand Prix, Schumacher took pole position but suffered engine failure on the formation lap. He won three races, more than the team's total tally for the period from 1991 to 1995, despite a poor chassis. He took his first win for Ferrari at the Spanish Grand Prix, where he lapped the entire field up to third place in the wet. After a bad start, which saw him dropping from third to sixth place, before taking the lead on lap 19, he consistently lapped five seconds faster than the rest of the field in the difficult conditions. At the Belgian Grand Prix, he used well-timed pit stops to fend off Williams' Jacques Villeneuve. He also won in front of the tifosi (Ferrari fans) at the Italian Grand Prix.

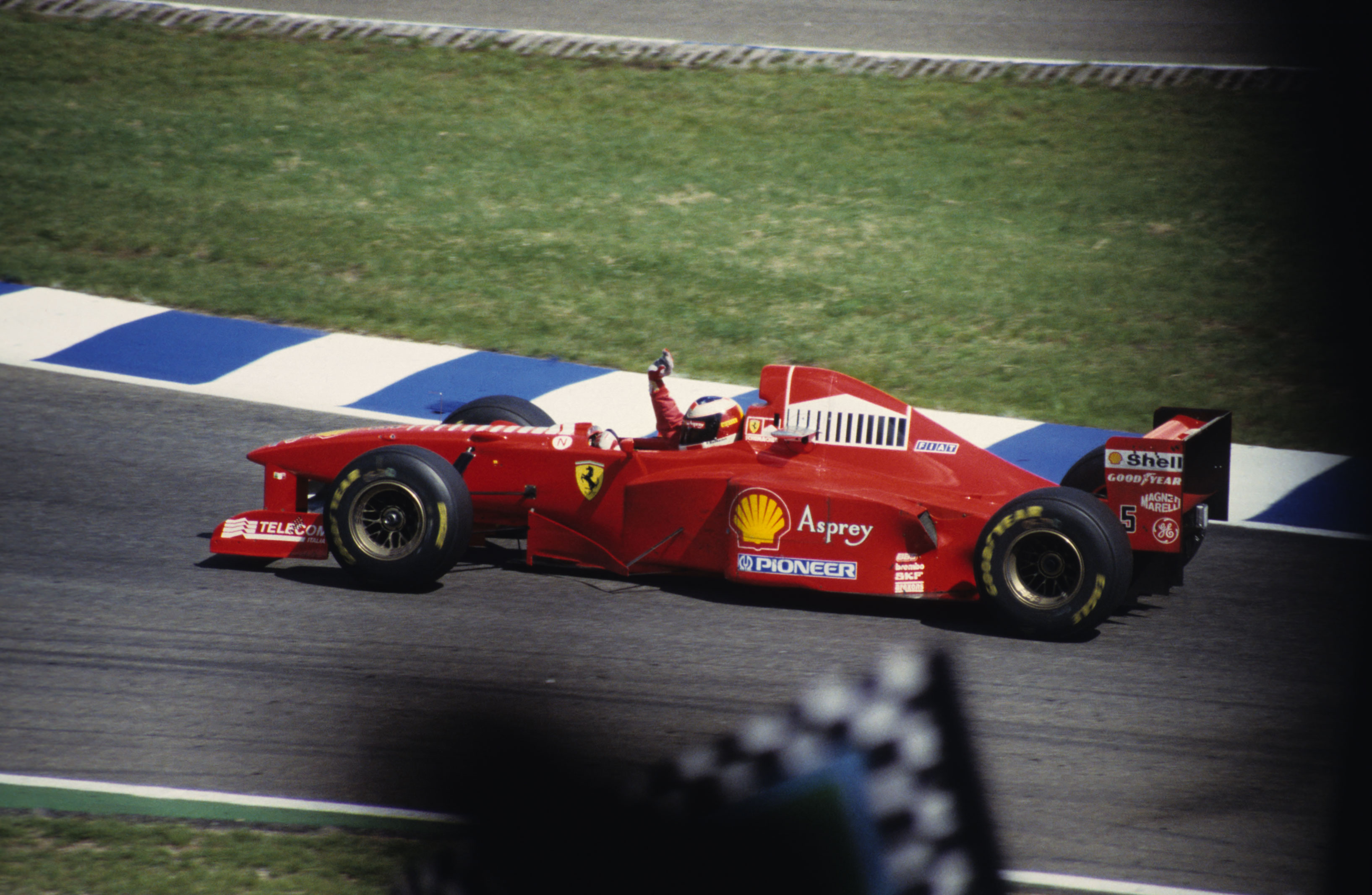
Schumacher celebrates a second-place finish at the German Grand Prix in 1997, the year he brought Ferrari to a Drivers' Championship challenge.

Schumacher and Villeneuve competed for the title in 1997, despite never sharing a podium and almost never battling directly on the track, in what has been described as the sport's most dramatic and controversial season finale. Villeneuve, driving the superior Williams FW19, led the championship in the early part of the season. Schumacher's first win of the season came at the wet Monaco Grand Prix, in which he took a six-second lead after one lap. By mid-season, despite possibly driving not even the second-fastest car on the grid, Schumacher had taken the championship lead, winning five races, and entered the season's finale (the European Grand Prix at the Jerez Circuit) with a one-point advantage. In qualifying, Schumacher set the same fastest lap as Villeneuve and Frentzen. He started in second position as Villeneuve set his fastest lap first but was able to jump him at the start.

In the middle stages of the race, Schumacher's Ferrari developed a coolant leak and loss of performance indicating he might not finish the race. As Villeneuve approached to pass his rival on lap 48, Schumacher turned in to the corner earlier than expected, hit the side of Villeneuve's Williams car and slid off the track into the gravel trap, retiring from the race. Villeneuve went on and scored four points to take the championship. Despite public outcry, the race stewards did not initially award any penalty, as they had deemed it a racing incident; two weeks after the race, in an unprecedented move, Schumacher was disqualified from the entire 1997 Drivers' Championship after an FIA disciplinary hearing found that his "manoeuvre was an instinctive reaction and although deliberate not made with malice or premeditation, it was a serious error." Initially feeling wronged, Schumacher accepted the decision and admitted having made a mistake, upon seeing the footage when he got out of the car and adrenaline had worn off. His actions were widely condemned in British, German, and Italian newspapers. Another view is that Villeneuve went into the corner too fast; without Schumacher turning into him, he would have overshot the turn and ended up in the gravel. In later years, Villeneuve himself admitted that he "would never have made that corner without [Schumacher's] push", and Schumacher stated in 2009 that if he could have his career over again, he would "do some things differently", citing Jerez 1997 as something that he would have changed in his career.

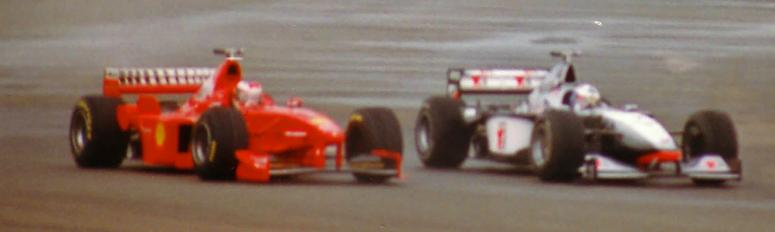
Schumacher battles with David Coulthard in 1998 at the British Grand Prix. For the second consecutive year, Schumacher lost out the World Championship at the last race.

In 1998, Finnish driver Mika Häkkinen became Schumacher's main title rival. Driving the superior McLaren MP4/13, Häkkinen won the first two races of the season, gaining a 16-point advantage over Schumacher, who then won the Argentine Grand Prix. With the Ferrari improving significantly in the second half of the season, Schumacher took six victories and had five other podium finishes. One of his victories was at the Hungarian Grand Prix, a track where overtaking is difficult and that favoured McLaren; Schumacher drove 19 consecutive qualifying-like laps to make race engineer Ross Brawn's alternative three-stop strategy work and to go from third to first place. Brawn had told him: "Michael, you have 19 laps to pull out 25 seconds. We need 19 qualifying laps from you." Schumacher ultimately came nine seconds ahead of David Coulthard. Häkkinen, who started on pole, achieved only a point due to reliability issues. Ferrari took a 1–2 finish at the French Grand Prix, the first Ferrari 1–2 finish since 1990, and at the Italian Grand Prix, which tied Schumacher with Häkkinen for the lead of the Drivers' Championship with 80 points.

There were two controversies during the 1998 season. At the British Grand Prix, Schumacher was leading the race when he was handed a ten-second stop-go penalty just three laps from the finish, which was a result of overtaking the lapped car of Alexander Wurz during a safety car period. As regulations stated that a penalty must be served within three racing laps of its being handed out, Schumacher and Ferrari decided to serve the penalty on the last lap when he turned into the pit lane, crossed the start-finish line, and stopped in his pit box, thereby winning the Grand Prix (and rendering the race over) whilst simultaneously technically still serving the penalty. There was some doubt whether this counted as serving the penalty; because he had crossed the finish line when he came into the pit lane, the win was valid. The FIA rescinded the penalty due to taking 31 minutes to issue it, rather than within the 25 minutes limit, and rejected McLaren's protest. At the Belgian Grand Prix, Schumacher was leading the race by 40 seconds in heavy spray but collided with Coulthard's McLaren when the Scot, a lap down, slowed on the racing line in poor visibility to let Schumacher past. His Ferrari lost a wheel but could return to the pits, although he was forced to retire. Schumacher leaped out of his car and headed to McLaren's garage in an infuriated manner and accused Coulthard of "trying to kill" him. Coulthard admitted five years later that the accident had been his mistake. From a possible three-point lead, Schumacher was still seven points behind Häkkinen. Heading into the final race, the Japanese Grand Prix, Häkkinen held a four-point advantage over Schumacher, who started on pole but stalled and caused the start to be aborted, which meant he had to start from the back of the field. He made a comeback up to third but retired after hitting debris from an accident. Häkkinen won the Drivers' Championship by winning the final two races despite Schumacher being the polesitter both times, continuing Ferrari's longest World Championship drought.

In 1999, Schumacher's efforts helped Ferrari win the Constructors' Championship, the team's first title since 1983. He lost his chance to win the Drivers' Championship at the British Grand Prix at the high-speed Stowe Corner; his car's rear brake failed, sending him off the track into the barriers and resulting in a broken leg. During his 98-day absence, he was replaced by Finnish driver Mika Salo. About his return, Schumacher's teammate Irvine recalled: "It was amazing. I remember me and Mika Salo were testing at Mugello, which is one of the hardest circuits in the world—and he [Schumacher] hadn't driven for eight months. He got in the car and within a lap he was a tenth or two tenths slower than I was. How do you do that? And then of course a couple of laps later he's half a second quicker and—it's just impossible. It's really really annoying, but it was an honour to be able to see his telemetry and see the things he could do with a car." After missing six races, he made his return at the inaugural Malaysian Grand Prix, qualifying in pole position with his career's greatest pole margin, with his time faster than Irvine by almost a second. He then assumed the role of second driver, helping Irvine to victory and assisting his teammate's bid to win the Drivers' Championship for Ferrari, with Irvine leading the championship by one point. About Schumacher's role, Irvine stated: "He is not only the best driver in the world, he is also the best number two in the world." In the last race of the season, the Japanese Grand Prix, Häkkinen won his second consecutive title after he beat him off the line. Schumacher later said that Häkkinen was "the best opponent I've had" and the one he respected the most.

==== 2000–2004: Five consecutive World Championships ====
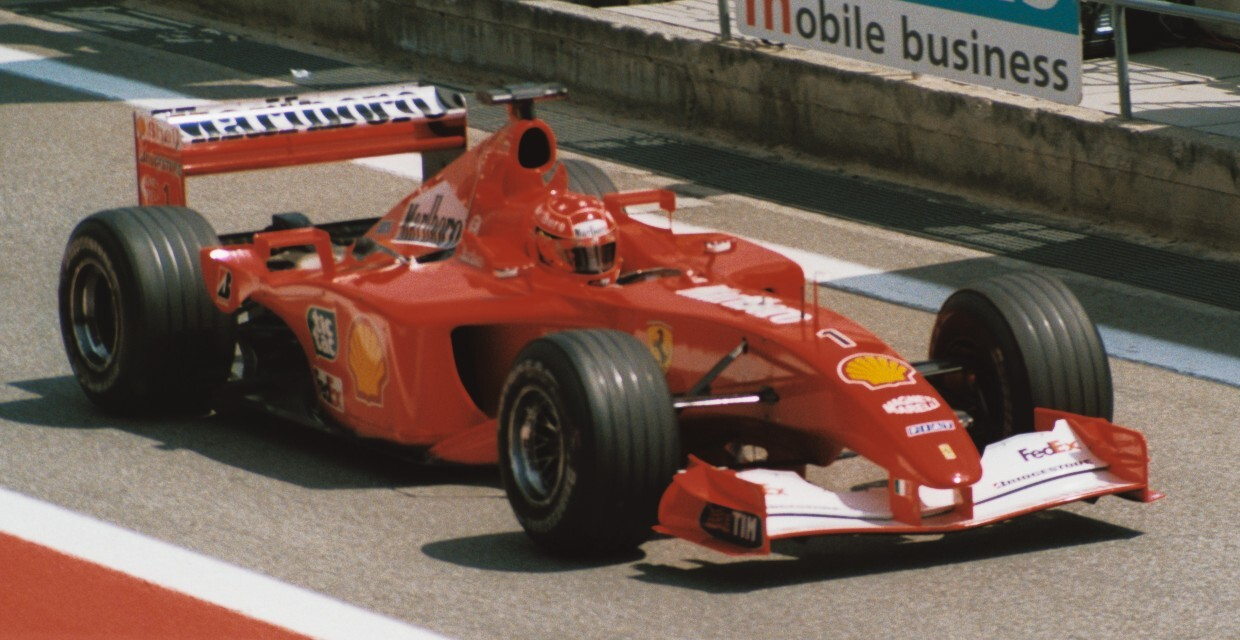
Schumacher driving for Ferrari in 2001 at the Spanish Grand Prix. The year prior, he had won Ferrari's first Drivers' Championship since 1979.

In 2000, Schumacher won his third Drivers' Championship, his first with Ferrari, after a year-long battle with Häkkinen. Schumacher won the first three races of the season and five of the first eight. Midway through the year, Schumacher's chances suffered with three consecutive non-finishes, allowing Häkkinen to close the gap in the standings. At the German Grand Prix qualifying session, which was largely decided in the opening 10 minutes of semi-dry weather, Schumacher was able to improve his time in the final seconds and qualified second. In the race, he retired after crashing out at the start, as his new teammate Rubens Barrichello took his maiden win from 18th. Häkkinen then took another two victories, before Schumacher won at the Italian Grand Prix, his 41st career win. At the post-race press conference, after equalling the number of wins won by his idol Ayrton Senna, Schumacher broke into tears.

The championship fight came down to the penultimate race of the season, the Japanese Grand Prix. Starting from pole position, Schumacher lost the lead to Häkkinen at the start. After his second pit stop, Schumacher came out ahead of Häkkinen and went on to win the race and the Drivers' Championship, the first for Ferrari since 1979, ending a 21-year drought; he later described it as the fight of his life. Although Schumacher won more than twice as many Grands Prix as Häkkinen, BBC Sport journalist Andrew Benson stated that "the challenge from Mika Hakkinen and McLaren-Mercedes was far stronger than the raw statistics suggest" and that the Adrian Newey-designed McLaren was "the fastest car in F1 for the third straight year". Benson also hailed Schumacher as "unquestionably the greatest driver of his era".

In 2001, Schumacher took his fourth Drivers' title. Four other drivers won races but none sustained a season-long challenge for the championship. Schumacher scored a record-tying nine wins and clinched the World Championship with four races yet to run. He finished the championship with 123 points, 58 ahead of runner-up Coulthard. Season highlights included the Spanish Grand Prix, where he won after Häkkinen retired on the last lap due to his car's clutch failing leading Schumacher to say he was sorry for him and that they had been "bloody lucky"; Canadian Grand Prix, where Schumacher finished second to his brother Ralf, thus scoring the first-ever 1–2 finish by brothers in Formula One; and the Belgian Grand Prix, in which Schumacher scored his 52nd career win, breaking Prost's record for most career wins that had stood since 1993.

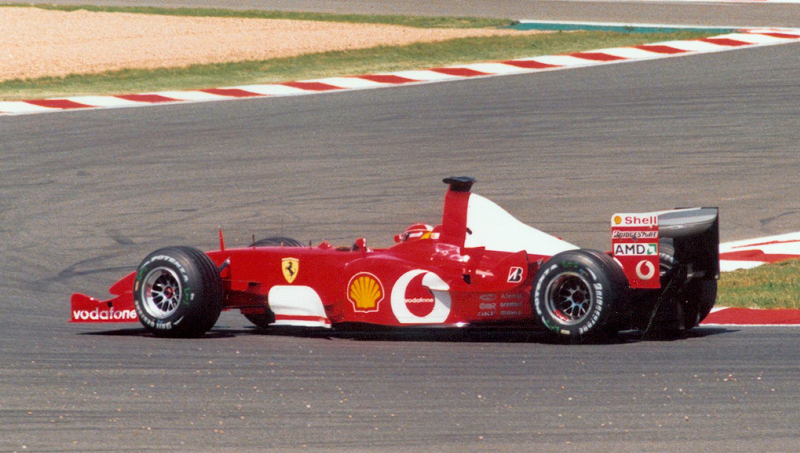
Schumacher driving the Ferrari F2002 at the French Grand Prix. It was at this race that he clinched the 2002 Drivers' Championship, setting the record for the fewest races in locking up the title.

In 2002, Schumacher retained his Drivers' Championship. In winning the Drivers' Championship, he equalled the record set by Juan Manuel Fangio of five World Championships. Ferrari won 15 out of 17 races, and Schumacher won the title with six races remaining in the season, which is still the earliest point in the season for a driver to be crowned World Champion. Schumacher broke his own record, shared with Mansell, of nine race wins in a season, by winning 11 times and finishing every race on the podium, the latter feat unmatched in the history of Formula One. He finished with 144 points, a record-breaking 67 points ahead of the runner-up, his teammate Barrichello. This pair finished nine of the 17 races in the first two places.

During the 2002 season, there was some controversy at the Austrian Grand Prix, where Barrichello was leading but in the final metres of the race, under team orders, slowed down to allow Schumacher to win the race. Although the switching of positions did not break any actual sporting or technical regulation, as Ferrari did the same at the Austrian Grand Prix the previous year where Schumacher finished second and Barrichello third, it angered fans and it was claimed that the team's actions showed a lack of sportsmanship and respect to the spectators. Many argued that Schumacher did not need to be given wins in only the sixth race of the season, which he would have won anyway, a view also shared by Jean Todt and Brawn in retrospect, particularly given that he had already won four of the previous five Grands Prix, and that Barrichello had dominated the race weekend up to that point. At the podium ceremony, Schumacher pushed Barrichello onto the top step, and the Ferrari team incurred a $1 million fine for this disturbance.

Schumacher vowed to pay back Barrichello, and later that same year returned the favour in several races to help him finish second in the standings. At the United States Grand Prix, Schumacher returned the favour, by giving Barrichello the win by 0.011 seconds, the second-closest margin on the finishing line in Formula One history in a failed dead heat finish. In an unplanned finish, Schumacher's explanation varied between it being him "returning the favour" for Austria, or trying to engineer a formation finish—a feat derided as near-impossible in a sport where timings are taken to within a thousandth of a second. After the end of the season, the FIA banned "team orders which interfere with the race result"; the ban was lifted for the 2011 season because the ruling was difficult to enforce.

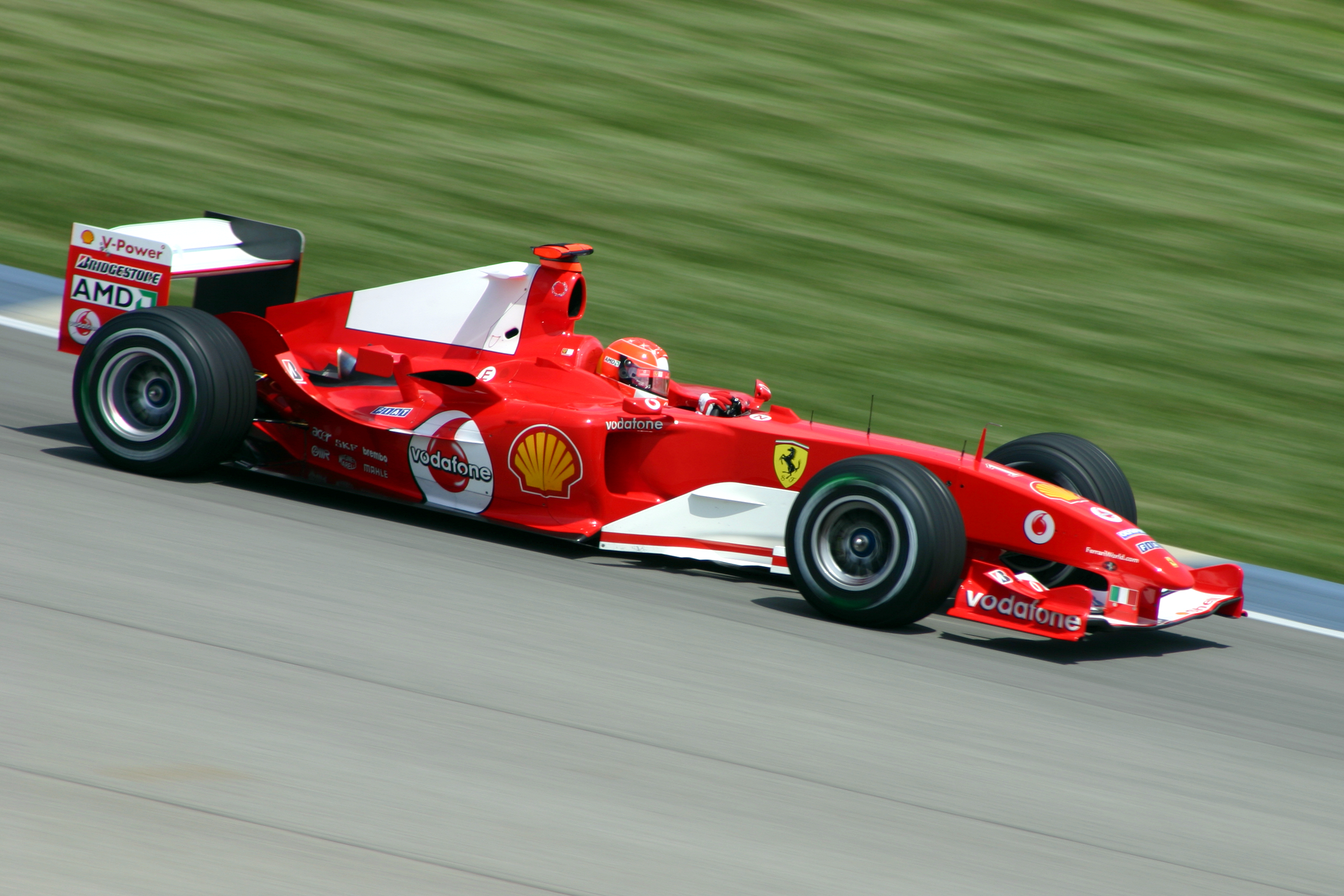
Schumacher at the Indianapolis Motor Speedway in 2004, where he won the United States Grand Prix. 2004 would be the last of his seven Drivers' Championships (a record shared with Lewis Hamilton since 2020), five of which were won consecutively from 2000 to 2004.

Schumacher broke Fangio's 46-year record of five Drivers' Championships by winning the drivers' title for the sixth time in 2003, after a closely contested battle with his main rivals, which was also a result of lobbying regarding the Michelin tyres. Before the season started, the FIA introduced new regulations and a new points system to make the championship more open. The biggest competition came from the McLaren-Mercedes and Williams-BMW teams. In the first race, Schumacher was run off track, and he was involved in collisions in the following two. He fell 16 points behind McLaren's Kimi Räikkönen. Despite the death of his mother Elisabeth just hours before the race, Schumacher won the San Marino Grand Prix despite losing the first position going into turn one.

Schumacher won the next two races and closed within two points of Räikkönen. Aside from Schumacher's victory at the Canadian Grand Prix and Barrichello's victory at the British Grand Prix, the mid-season was dominated by Williams drivers Ralf Schumacher and Juan Pablo Montoya, who each claimed two victories. After the Hungarian Grand Prix, Schumacher led Montoya and Räikkönen by only one and two points, respectively. Ahead of the next race, the FIA announced changes to the way tyre widths were to be measured: this forced Michelin, supplier to Williams and McLaren among others, to rapidly redesign their tyres before the Italian Grand Prix. Schumacher, running on Bridgestone tyres, won the next two races. After Montoya was penalised in the United States Grand Prix, only Schumacher and Räikkönen remained in contention for the title. At the final round, the Japanese Grand Prix, Schumacher needed only one point whilst Räikkönen needed to win. By finishing the race in eighth place, Schumacher took one point and assured his sixth Drivers' title, ending the season two points ahead of Räikkönen.

In 2004, Schumacher won a record 12 of the first 13 races of the season, including the inaugural Bahrain Grand Prix, with the Japanese Grand Prix as his last win of the season, only failing to finish in Monaco after an accident with Montoya during a safety car period. In August 2004, Schumacher's win at the Hungarian Grand Prix contributed to Ferrari's sixth consecutive Constructors' Championship, and he later clinched a seventh Drivers' Championship at the Belgian Grand Prix. Earlier in July at the French Grand Prix, Schumacher beat polesitter Fernando Alonso with a four-stop strategy. He finished the season with a record 148 points, 34 points ahead of the runner-up Barrichello, and set a new record of 13 race wins out of a possible 18, surpassing his previous best of 11 wins from the 2002 season. Between 2000 and 2004, Schumacher achieved five Drivers' Championships, 48 wins, and almost all Formula One records. With his fifth Drivers' Championship in a row, he also broke Fangio's record of consecutive titles that had stood for nearly fifty years.

==== 2005–2006: Regulation changes and first retirement ====
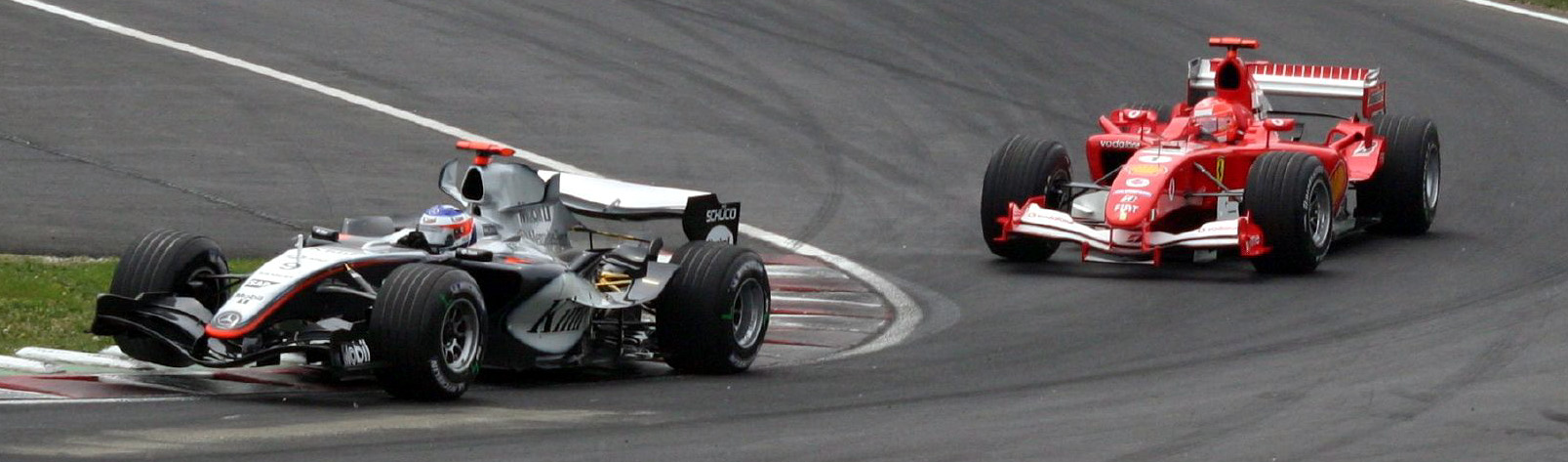
Schumacher battling with Kimi Räikkönen in 2005 during the Canadian Grand Prix. Due to rule changes, he achieved only one win that year.

Rule changes for the 2005 season required tyres to last an entire race, tipping the overall advantage to teams using Michelins over teams like Ferrari that relied on Bridgestone tyres. The rule changes were partly in an effort to dent Ferrari's dominance and make the series more interesting. The most notable moment of the early season for Schumacher was his battle with Renault R25 driver Fernando Alonso at the San Marino Grand Prix, where he started 13th and finished only 0.2 seconds behind Alonso. Less than halfway through the season, Schumacher stated: "I don't think I can count myself in this battle any more. It was like trying to fight with a blunted weapon. If your weapons are weak you don't have a chance." Schumacher's sole win in 2005 came at the United States Grand Prix in a 1–2 finish with Barrichello. Before that race, the Michelin tyres were found to have significant safety issues. When no compromise between the teams and the FIA could be reached, all but the three teams using Bridgestone tyres dropped out of the race after the formation lap, leaving only six drivers on the grid. Schumacher retired in 6 of the 19 races, and finished the season in third with 62 points, fewer than half the points of World Champion Alonso.

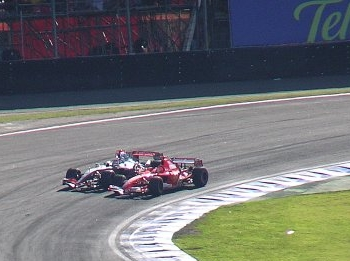
Schumacher overtakes Kimi Räikkönen for fourth with three laps to go of the Brazilian Grand Prix, in what was the last race of a competitive 2006 season and his final race for three years, having dropped to 19th early on.

2006 became the last season of Schumacher's Ferrari career. After three races, Schumacher had just 11 points and was already 17 points behind Alonso. He won the following two races; his pole position at San Marino Grand Prix was his 66th, breaking Senna's 12-year-old record, which was described as perhaps the greatest record that stood in the sport, and was a reversal of the 2005 race. Schumacher was stripped of pole position at the Monaco Grand Prix and started the race at the back of the grid, as he stopped his car and blocked part of the circuit while Alonso was on his qualifying lap; he still managed to work his way up to fifth place on the notoriously cramped Monaco Circuit. Before the Turkish Grand Prix, the fourteenth race of the season, the FIA banned Renault's mass damper, with the superior Renault R26 suddenly no longer as competitive.

By the Canadian Grand Prix, the ninth race of the season, Schumacher was 25 points behind Alonso; he then won the following three races, including at Hockenheim, to reduce his disadvantage to 11, and to 10 by Turkey. Since Canada, Ferrari won six out of seven races, including at the Monza Circuit, with Schumacher winning in five of them. After further victories at the Italian Grand Prix, where he announced his retirement at the end of the season, and at the Chinese Grand Prix, in what would be his 91st and final career win, Schumacher led in the championship standings for the first time during the season. After his win in Italy, Ferrari issued a press release stating that Schumacher would retire from racing at the end of the 2006 season but would continue working for the team. The tifosi and the Italian press, who did not always take to Schumacher's relatively cold public persona, displayed an affectionate response after he announced his retirement.

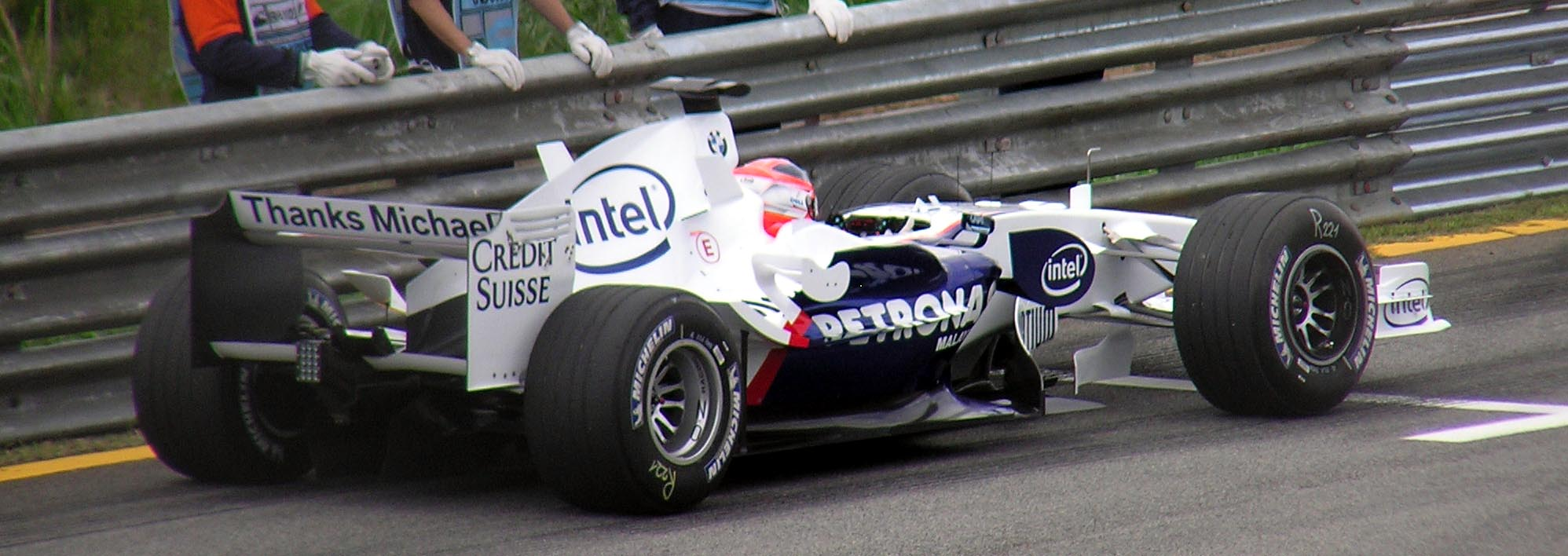
BMW Sauber with "Thanks Michael" messages towards Schumacher on the back of their cars. He and Peter Sauber had worked together in sports cars before entering Formula One in 1992.

After qualifying second, Schumacher led the Japanese Grand Prix in what could have seen him heading into the season finale with two points ahead of Alonso. With only 16 laps to go, his car suffered an engine failure for the first time since the French Grand Prix in 2000, ending a 58-race sequence without a mechanical retirement, handing Alonso the victory. He also conceded the title; to win the Drivers' Championship, Schumacher would have had to win the final race and Alonso had to fail to score any point, and he did not wish to win the title like that.

A fuel pressure problem prevented Schumacher from completing a single lap during the third qualifying session, forcing him to start the race in tenth position. Early in the race, Schumacher moved up to sixth place but suffered a puncture caused by the front wing of Giancarlo Fisichella's Renault. Schumacher fell to 19th place, 70 seconds behind teammate and race leader Felipe Massa. Schumacher recovered and overtook both Fisichella and Räikkönen, his successor at Ferrari following his retirement, to secure fourth place. His performance was praised, as he had the pace to win the race by a lap, and was variously classified in the press as "heroic", an "utterly breath-taking drive", and a "performance that ... sums up his career".

During the following weeks, Schumacher, Brawn, Byrne, and Todt were credited for turning the struggling Ferrari team into the most successful team in Formula One history, with Schumacher winning 72 Grands Prix and five consecutive Drivers' titles there. At the end of 2006, Schumacher's 91 wins were 40 more than his nearest rival Prost. Schumacher held at least 31 records, including for most championship titles (7), consecutive titles (5), race victories (91), consecutive wins (7, 2004), wins with one team (72, Ferrari), wins at same Grand Prix (8, France), wins at different Grands Prix (20), time between first and last wins (14 years, 1 month, and 2 days), second places (43), podiums (154), consecutive podium finishes (19, 2001–2002), points finishes (190), laps leading (4.741, or 22,155 km), pole positions (68), front row starts (115), fastest laps (76), doubles (pole and win, 40), hat-tricks (pole, fastest lap, and win, 22), championship points (1,369), consecutive race finishes (24, 2001–2003), consecutive points finishes (24), points in a season for the runner-up (121 out of 180, 2006), wins in a season for the runner-up (7, 2006), races for same car and engine builder (180, Ferrari), wins at Indianapolis (5), wins at Monza (5), wins in a season (13, 2004), fastest laps in a season (10, 2004), points scored in a season (148, 2004), podium finishes in a season (17, 2002), championship won with most races left (6, 2002), and consecutive years with a win (15).

==== 2007–2009: New roles at Ferrari, motorcycle racing, and injury ====
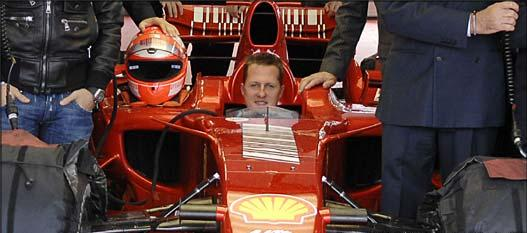
Schumacher in the Ferrari F2007 at Fiorano. It is the last Ferrari to have won the Driver's Championship since Schumacher.

During the 2007 season, Schumacher acted as Ferrari's adviser and Jean Todt's super assistant. Schumacher also helped Ferrari with their development programme at the Jerez Circuit. He focused on testing electronics and tyres for the 2008 season. During 2008, Schumacher also competed in motorcycle racing in the IDM Superbike series. At a Superbike cup race at the Pannónia-Ring, Schumacher finished third out of twenty-seven—behind professional motorcycle racers Martin Bauer and Andreas Meklau—riding a Honda CBR1000RR.

At the Hungarian Grand Prix on 25 July 2009, Ferrari's Felipe Massa was seriously injured after being struck by a suspension spring during qualifying. Ferrari announced that they planned to draft in Schumacher for the European Grand Prix and subsequent Grands Prix until Massa was able to race again. Schumacher tested a modified Ferrari F2007 to prepare himself as he had been unable to test the Ferrari F60 due to testing restrictions. Ferrari appealed for special permission for Schumacher to test in a 2009 season spec car; Williams, Red Bull, and Toro Rosso were against this test. In the end, Schumacher was forced to call off his return due to the severity of the neck injury he had received in a motorcycle accident earlier in the year. Instead, Massa's place was first filled by Luca Badoer and later on by Fisichella. Schumacher described this aborted return to Formula One as his "toughest moment".

=== Mercedes (2010–2012) ===
"He played a crucial role when we re-joined F1 and was one of the people who laid the foundation for our future success. We're extremely grateful for everything he did for us."

— Mercedes' team principal Toto Wolff about Schumacher's influence on the Mercedes team

In December 2009, Schumacher announced his return to Formula One for the 2010 season alongside fellow German driver and 24-year-old Nico Rosberg in the new Mercedes GP team. The 2009 season had ended with Brawn GP (taking over from Honda) winning both titles, after winning six of the first seven races. For the 2010 season, Mercedes returned to the sport as a constructor for the first time since 1955, and Schumacher rejoined team principal Ross Brawn, who was behind all of his seven World Championships. Schumacher stated that his preparations to replace the injured Massa had initiated a renewed interest in Formula One, which, combined with the opportunity to fulfil a long-held ambition to drive for Mercedes and to be working again with Brawn, led Schumacher to accept the offer once he was passed fit. Speaking to the BBC, Schumacher said: "I want to have fun out there and I feel as fresh as ever. I've recharged myself after a three-year break. The challenge is what I look for—I want to know it."

Schumacher signed a three-year contract, reportedly worth £20 million. Schumacher's comeback was the most high profile in Formula One since Niki Lauda came out of a two-year retirement for the 1982 season to race for McLaren and went on to win a third world title in 1984. He turned 41 in 2010, the same age Mansell won the 1994 Australian Grand Prix after having stepped in as a substitute following Senna's death, and his prospects with Mercedes were compared with Mansell, who had won a title at 39 and last competed aged 41; Hill, who competed his final season at 39; and Fangio, Formula One's oldest champion who was 46 when he won his fifth title.

==== 2010: Return from retirement ====
After having impressed in the free practices, Schumacher finished sixth in the first race of the season at the Bahrain Grand Prix, 1,239 days after his previous Formula One race. He finished behind teammate Rosberg in each of the first four qualifying sessions and races; former driver Stirling Moss suggested that Schumacher might be "past it". Several other former Formula One drivers thought otherwise, including Hill, who warned "you should never write Schumacher off". GrandPrix.com identified the inherent understeer of the Mercedes car, exacerbated by the narrower front tyres introduced for the 2010 season, as contributing to Schumacher's difficulties. Jenson Button would later claim that Mercedes's car was designed for him, as he would initially drive for the team, and that their differing driving styles may have contributed to Schumacher's difficulties.

Mercedes upgraded their car for the Spanish Grand Prix where Schumacher finished fourth. At the Monaco Grand Prix, Schumacher finished sixth after passing Ferrari's Fernando Alonso on the final corner before the finish line when the safety car returned to the pits. Mercedes held that "the combination of the race control messages 'Safety Car in this lap' and 'Track Clear' and the green flags and lights shown by the marshals after safety car line one indicated that the race was not finishing under the safety car and all drivers were free to race." An FIA investigation found Schumacher guilty of breaching safety car regulations and awarded him a 20-second penalty, dropping him to 12th. In doing so, the FIA sought to clarify the regulations post-race, as the new and old rules appeared to be in conflict.

At the Turkish Grand Prix, Schumacher qualified fifth and finished fourth in the race, both his best results since his return. At the European Grand Prix in Valencia, Schumacher finished 15th, the lowest recorded finish in his career. At the Hungarian Grand Prix, Barrichello attempted to pass Schumacher down the inside on the main straight. Schumacher closed the inside line to force Barrichello onto the outside; Barrichello persisted on the inside at 180 mph (290 km/h) despite the close proximity of a concrete wall and Schumacher leaving him only inches to spare. Schumacher, who finished 12th, was found guilty of dangerous driving and was demoted ten places on the grid for the following race, the Belgian Grand Prix, where he finished seventh despite starting 21st after his grid penalty. At the Abu Dhabi Grand Prix, Schumacher was involved in a major accident on the first lap, after Vitantonio Liuzzi's car collided with Schumacher's, barely missing his head. Schumacher finished the season in ninth place with 72 points. For the first time since 1991, Schumacher finished a year without a win, pole position, podium, or fastest lap.

==== 2011–2012: Final podium and second retirement ====
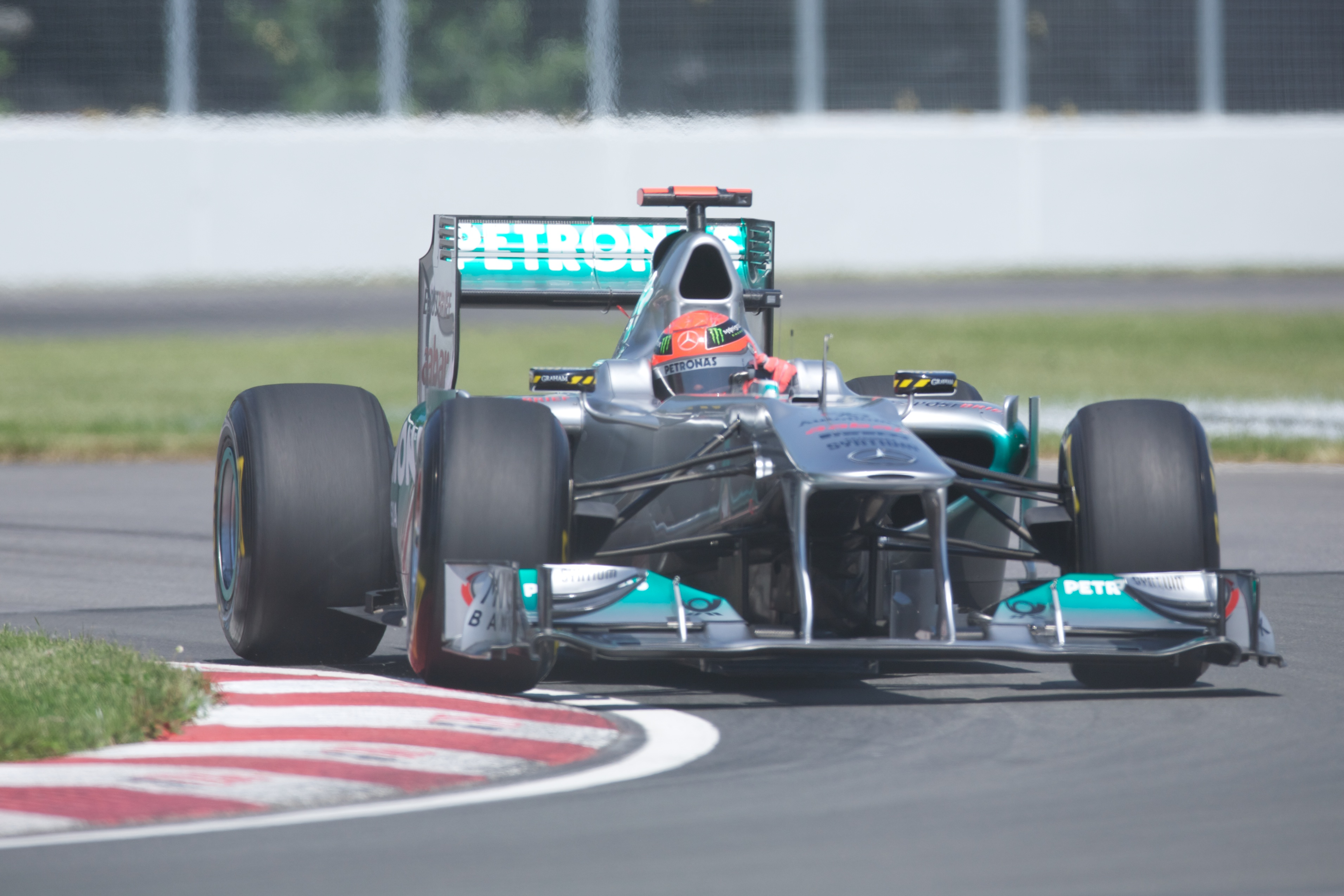
In 2011, Schumacher finished fourth in the Canadian Grand Prix. It was his best result for the season.

After starting the 2011 season with a retirement, Schumacher's first points were scored at the Malaysian Grand Prix where he finished ninth. Schumacher later came sixth at the Spanish Grand Prix, and he took fourth place at the Canadian Grand Prix, after running as high as second in a wet race; his Canadian race was seen at the time as his most convincing performance since he came out of retirement. Despite starting last at the Belgian Grand Prix, twenty years after his debut, Schumacher finished fifth. The Japanese Grand Prix saw Schumacher lead three laps during the race, marking the first time he had led a race since 2006. In doing so, he became the oldest driver to lead a race since Jack Brabham in 1970. Schumacher finished the season in eighth place in the Drivers' Championship, with 76 points.

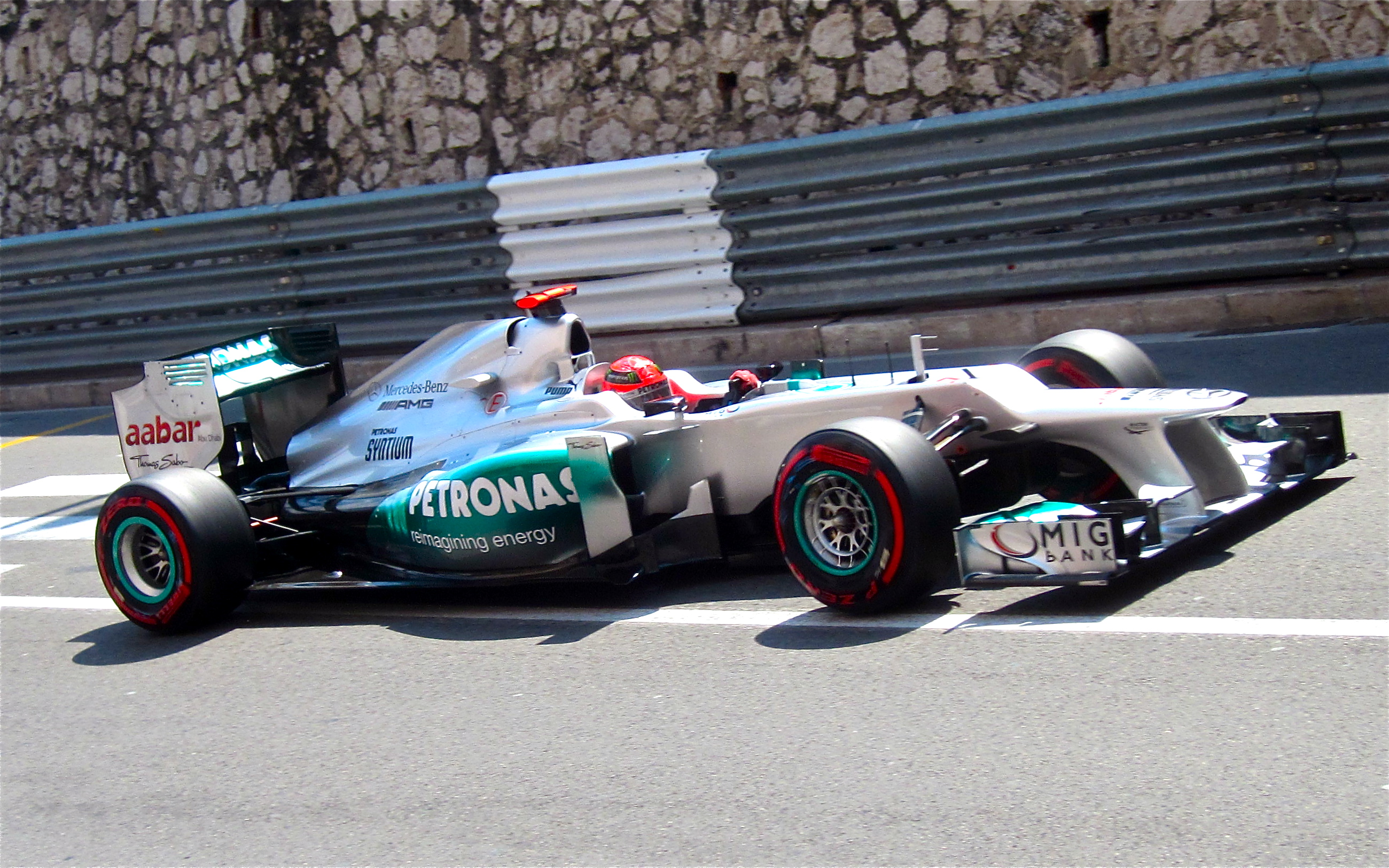
In 2012, Schumacher qualified fastest at the Monaco Grand Prix, for the first time since 2006.

Schumacher was again partnered by Rosberg at Mercedes for the 2012 season. After qualifying fourth in what was his best qualifying since his return, he retired from the season's inaugural Australian Grand Prix, and scored a point in the second round at the Malaysian Grand Prix with intermittent rain, after qualifying third. At the Chinese Grand Prix, Schumacher started on the front row but retired due to a loose wheel after a mechanic's error during a pit stop.

After causing a collision with Bruno Senna at the Spanish Grand Prix, Schumacher received a five-place grid penalty for the Monaco Grand Prix. Twenty-one years into his career, Schumacher was fastest in qualifying in Monaco but started sixth owing to his penalty. He later retired from seventh place in the race. At the European Grand Prix, Schumacher finished third, his only podium finish since his return to Formula One. At 43 years and 173 days, he became the oldest driver to achieve a podium since 1970, when Brabham finished second at the British Grand Prix. At the German Grand Prix, Schumacher set the fastest lap for the 77th time in his career. At the Belgian Grand Prix, Schumacher became the second driver in history (after Barrichello) to race in 300 Grands Prix; he took seventh place after starting 13th.

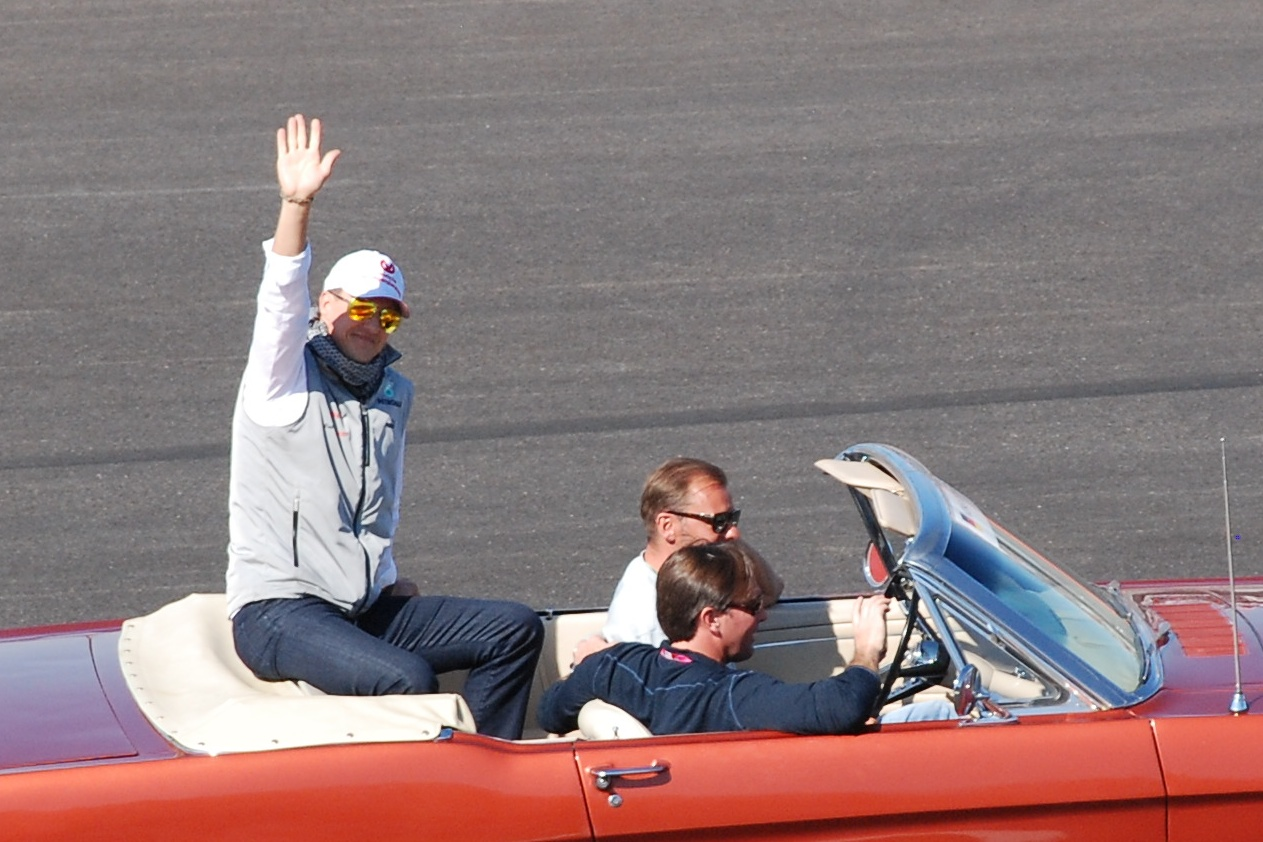
Schumacher at the United States Grand Prix in 2012. It was his penultimate career race.

Schumacher's indecision over his future plans led to him being replaced by Lewis Hamilton at Mercedes for the 2013 season. In October 2012, days before the Japanese Grand Prix, Schumacher announced he would retire for a second time, stating: "There were times in the past few months in which I didn't want to deal with Formula One or prepare for the next Grand Prix." Schumacher finished seventh at the Brazilian Grand Prix, his 308th and final entry and 306th race start, to end his season. This was also the starting position for his debut Formula One race. During the race, he symbolically pulled over for fellow German Sebastian Vettel en route to his then third Drivers' Championship. Schumacher finished 13th in the 2012 Drivers' Championship. During his comeback, he led three laps but never won a race, finishing no higher than eighth in the overall Formula One standings. He closed his career with 91 wins, 155 podiums, and 68 pole positions, which at the time were all records. Before Hamilton surpassed it in 2020, Schumacher's 91 wins were one fewer of Senna and Prost's combined total.

Despite a difficult three years, which included adaptation to significant different regulations and new Pirelli tyres, as well as rust, and being bested by his teammate, he had improved in the last two years where he arguably outraced Rosberg but bad luck and mechanical failures did not reflect it at the standings. It has been argued that it was his 2009 motorcycle accident why the comeback had not been successful. In the words of Mark Hughes, "I believe his motorcycle accident, and the damaged neurons from a neck injury that in 90 per cent of cases is fatal, was probably more responsible for his lack of form second time around than age or length of absence."

From 2014 to 2021, Mercedes went on to win a record-breaking (of Schumacher's Ferrari from 1999 to 2004) eight Constructors' Championships under Hamilton, Rosberg, and Valtteri Bottas. Brawn said that "Michael's contribution to our development and the future of our team has been significant", and observed: "In my opinion, he is the greatest Formula One driver, and the records which he holds in our sport speak volumes for his success and commitment." Brawn also stated that had Schumacher not retired in 2012 and not suffered a ski injury in 2013, he would have had a chance at winning his eighth World Championship in 2014. In 2023, Williams team principal James Vowles, who was Mercedes chief strategist during Schumacher's time at the team between 2010 and 2012 and was instrumental in the team's success in the mid-to-late 2010s, said that Schumacher brought Mercedes together. Vowles added: "[Schumacher] also knew his performance was perhaps not quite at the same level, but he made up for it in terms of the amount of work and dedication he put in. From that, Nico learned a lot and conversely, Lewis learned a lot from Nico."

== Driver profile and legacy ==
=== Profile ===
"Nobody will ever be greater than Schumi. [...] Michael shaped a generation like no other. He is iconic."

— Toto Wolff about Schumacher

Schumacher was noted throughout his career for his speed and racecraft, and his ability to produce fast laps at crucial moments in a race and to push his car to the very limit for sustained periods. He was also noted for his work ethic, pioneering fitness regimen, and ability to galvanise teams around him. In 2004, Nick Schulz of Slate described Schumacher as "the ultimate driving machine" and "the most dominant athlete in the world" due to him having become "quicker, stronger, and fitter than the competition by outworking them in the weight room". Schulz also stated that Schumacher changed the sport as he set a new benchmark for other drivers and built the team and technologies around him. Schumacher exercised four hours a day, mostly to strengthen his neck muscles to better withstand G-forces during races. After his gym session, he would often head to the race track for testing. In 2003, Deutsche Welle highlighted Schumacher's "natural talent" for racing and his "discipline and leadership". In 2023, Fisichella observed that Schumacher "did not even seem to have sweated" during races, adding that Schumacher is the greatest Formula One driver of all time and "rewrote the history of Formula One".

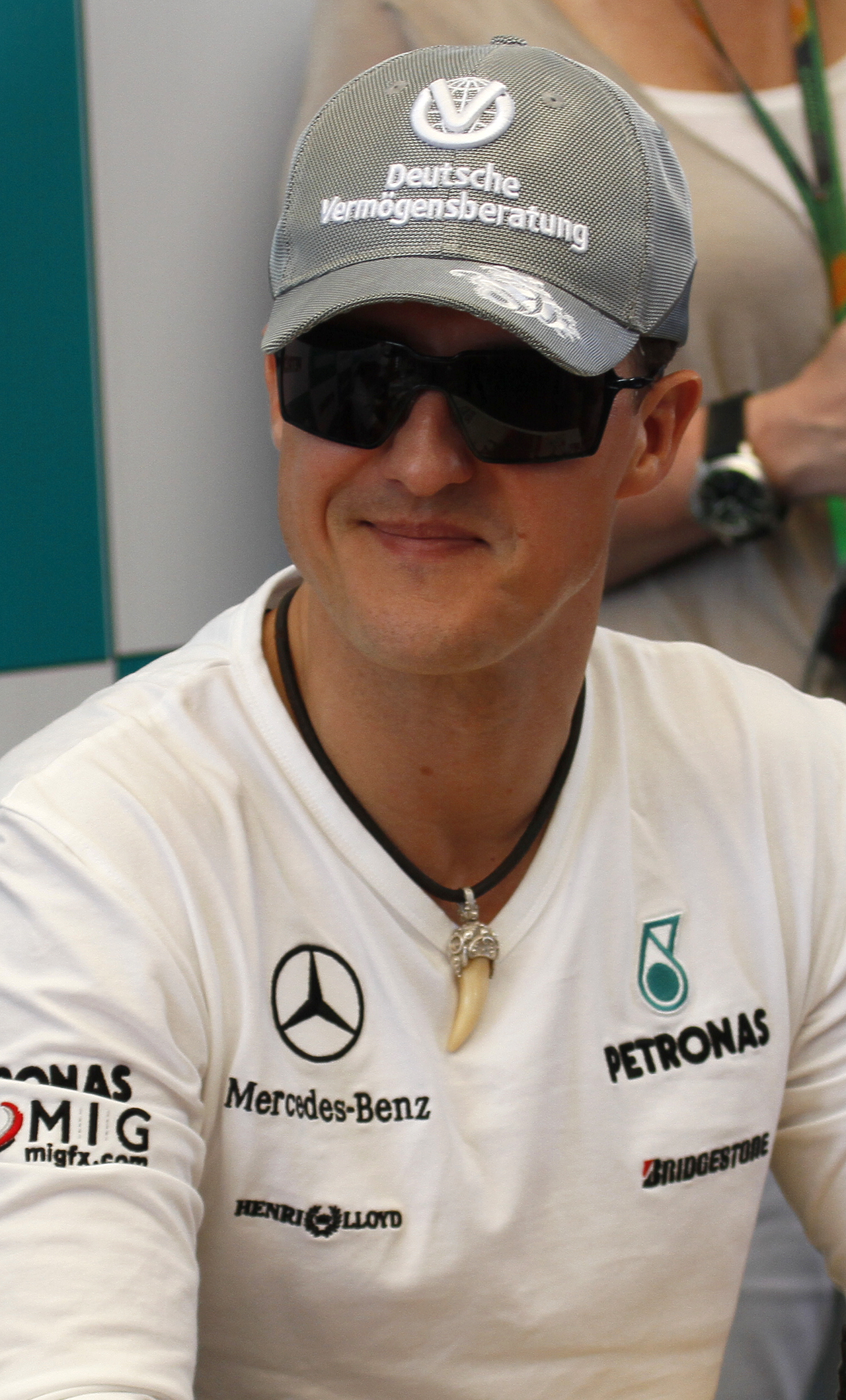
Schumacher in 2010, the year he made his comeback at 40

In 2003, F1 Racing analysed Schumacher's driving style using telemetry data. It was observed that Schumacher was very sensitive and flexible on the accelerator and brakes. Compared with his Ferrari teammate Barrichello, who often either braked or accelerated in a corner, Schumacher usually braked later into a corner and stabilised his car by accelerating slightly, often using both the brake and accelerator pedals at the same time. Exiting a corner, Schumacher accelerated considerably and balanced his car by braking lightly. Martin Brundle talked about being in awe upon seeing Schumacher's telemetry showing he took turn one on full throttle at the Suzuka Circuit. With his driving style, Schumacher also went 25 km/h faster through the hairpin corner of Suzuka compared to Barrichello, who lost 0.3 seconds to Schumacher in this corner. It was also observed that when needed, such as when the brakes started to overheat, Schumacher adapted his driving style to protect the brakes.

Motor Sport author Christopher Hilton observed in 2003 that a "measure of a driver's capabilities is his performance in wet races, because the most delicate car control and sensitivity are needed", and commented that, like other great drivers, Schumacher's record in wet conditions shows very few mistakes; up to the end of 2003, Schumacher won 17 of the 30 races in wet conditions he contested. Some of Schumacher's best performances occurred in such conditions, earning him the nicknames Regenkönig ("Rain King"), or Regenmeister ("Rain Master"), even in the non-German-language media. He is further known as "the Red Baron" because of his red Ferrari and in reference to the German Manfred von Richthofen, the famous flying ace of the First World War. Schumacher's nicknames also include "Schumi", "Schuey", and "Schu". In a 2006 FIA survey, Schumacher was voted the most popular driver of the season among Formula One fans.

Schumacher was noted for beating all his teammates during his Formula One career, except for his not-fully debut season against three-time World Champion Nelson Piquet, once for 1999 World Championship runner-up Irvine due to missing six races after a leg injury, and future 2016 World Champion Rosberg when he was in his 40s. Schumacher was also noted for outperforming his cars and for his ability to operate at his peak on every lap, having won significantly more races than he had either pole positions or fastest laps. Apart from dominating the 1995, 2001, 2002, and 2004 World Championships (with 2002 and 2004 being the sole years where he drove the clear-cut fastest car as Barrichello was the runner-up both years), he won the competitive 2003 World Championship and either won (three times) or narrowly missed (two times) World Championships despite arguably driving an inferior car (1994, 1995, 1997, 1998, and 2000), and arguably would have won in 1999 had it been for the injury, as the performance gap from McLaren was far smaller than in 1998.

=== Rivalries and anti-German prejudices ===
"The make-up of a champion is one of such inner self-belief that occasionally it shows up as flaws. The majority of the sporting greats I've met drive themselves forwards because they are always dissatisfied. But look at what Michael achieved, the speed at which he achieved it, and what he accomplished at two different teams. It's so hard to get to F1, to stay in it, to score podiums, and win races. And that guy won 91 of them, some of them in a class of one."

— Martin Brundle about Schumacher

Since Senna's death in 1994, Schumacher was widely regarded as Formula One's fastest driver and the most dominant driver of his era. During his long career, Schumacher was also involved in several controversies, most notably the 1994 and 1997 World Championship seasons finals and the 2006 Monaco qualifying. These episodes have been seen as a result of Schumacher's will-to-win mentality. Schumacher was subject to anti-German prejudices throughout his career, especially from the British media. About his collision with Schumacher in 1994, Hill wrote: "There are two things that set Michael apart from the rest of the drivers in Formula One − his sheer talent and his attitude. I am full of admiration for the former, but the latter leaves me cold."

According to Brawn, Schumacher was a "pretty misunderstood character", adding that "nobody I know who ever worked with Michael ever had a bad opinion about him because of his integrity, his commitment, his human side." In addition to Hill, Schumacher also had rivalries with Häkkinen, whom he beat for his first World Championship at Ferrari and the team's first Drivers' Championship since the 1979 season, and Alonso, who ended Schumacher's five-consecutive titles in the 2000s. Despite only facing him during Schumacher's brief comeback in the 2010s, Hamilton is also seen a rival due to their similar achievements and driving styles, and cited Schumacher as an inspiration.

=== Helmet ===
Schumacher, in conjunction with Schuberth, helped develop the first lightweight carbon fibre reinforced polymer helmet. In 2004, a prototype was publicly tested by being driven over by a tank; it survived intact. The helmet kept the driver cool by funneling directed airflow through 50 holes. Schumacher's original helmet sported the colours of the German flag and his sponsor's decals. On the top was a blue circle with white astroids. From the 2000 Monaco Grand Prix, in order to differentiate his colours from his new teammate Barrichello—whose helmet was predominantly white with a blue circle on top and a red ellipsis surrounding the visor—Schumacher changed the upper blue colour and some of the white areas to red. For the 2006 Brazilian Grand Prix, he wore an all-red helmet bearing the names of his 91 Grand Prix victories. Schumacher wore a special gold-leafed helmet for the 2011 Belgian Grand Prix, which marked the 20th anniversary of his Formula One debut as well as the seasons of his seven Drivers' titles. For his 300th Grand Prix appearance, the 2012 Belgian Grand Prix, he wore a platinum-leafed helmet with a message of the achievement.

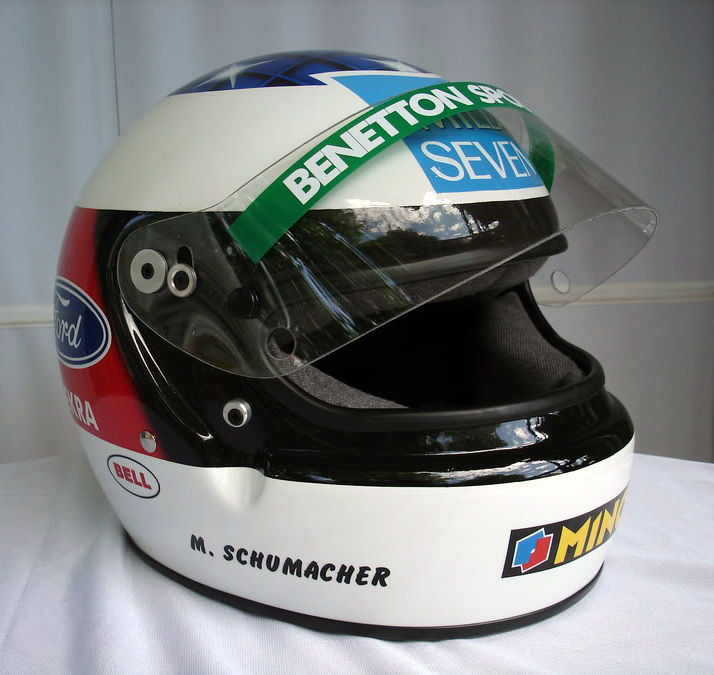
Helmet for the 1994 season (Benetton); Schumacher used the Bell Sports helmet for nine years in Formula One, from the Canadian Grand Prix to the Australian Grand Prix.

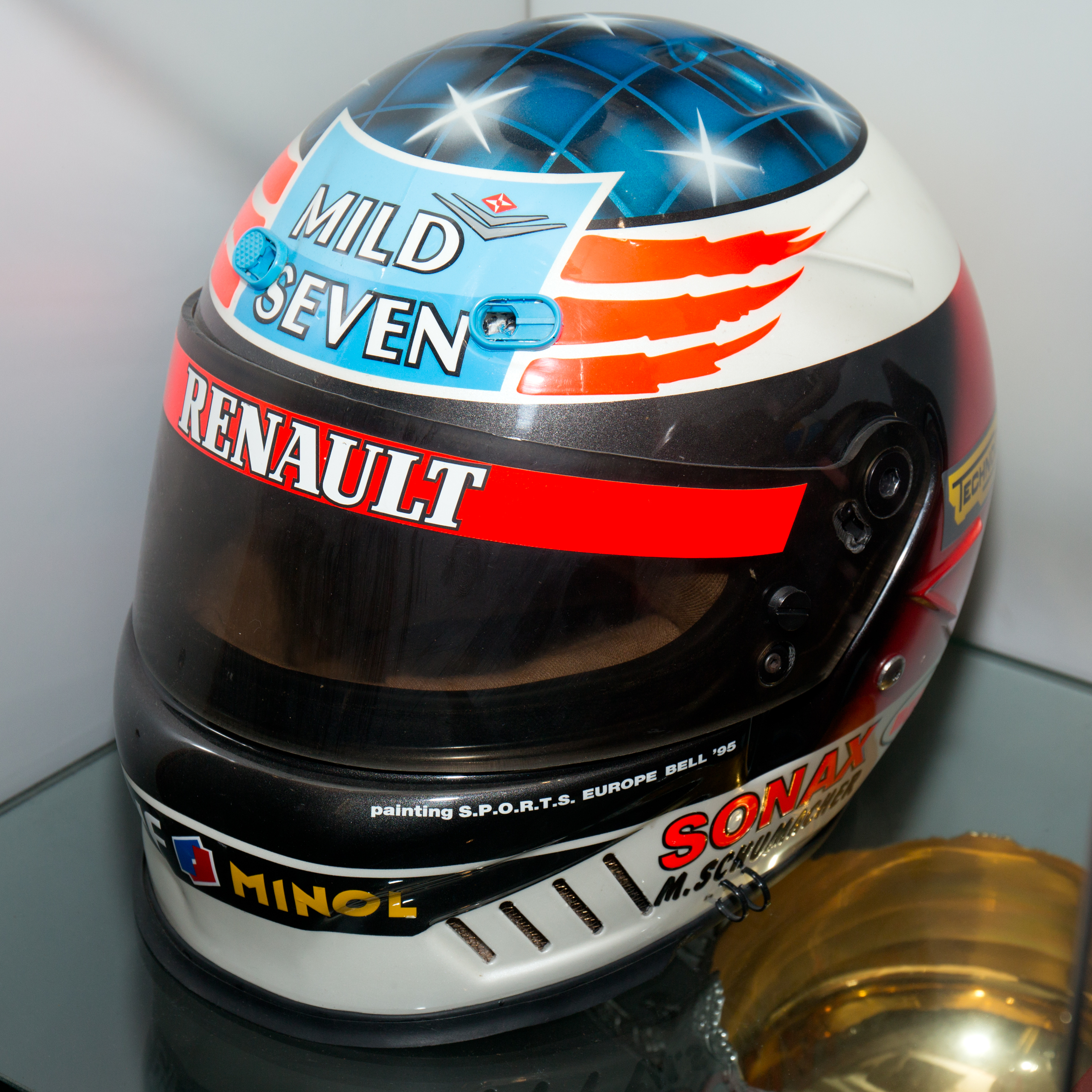
Bell helmet for the 1995 season (Benetton); Schumacher kept using this white-coloured helmet after moving to Ferrari in 1996 until he switched its colour to red at the Monaco Grand Prix.

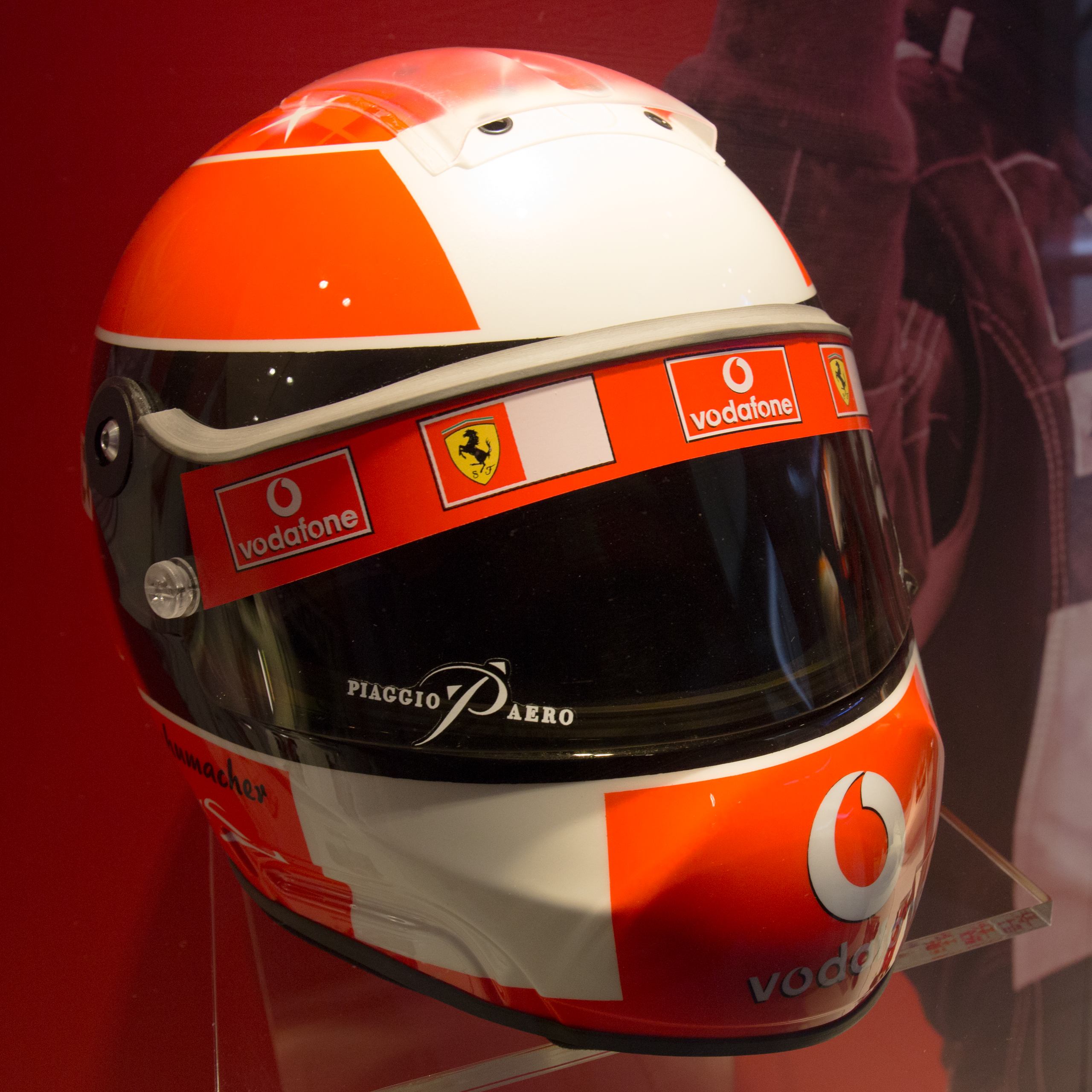
Schuberth helmet for the 2002 season (Ferrari); at the Malaysian Grand Prix, Schumacher switched his helmet from Bell to Schuberth, although there was a contract with Bell for the 2001 season. From the 2001 season, Schumacher continued to use the Schuberth helmet until his last race in Formula One.

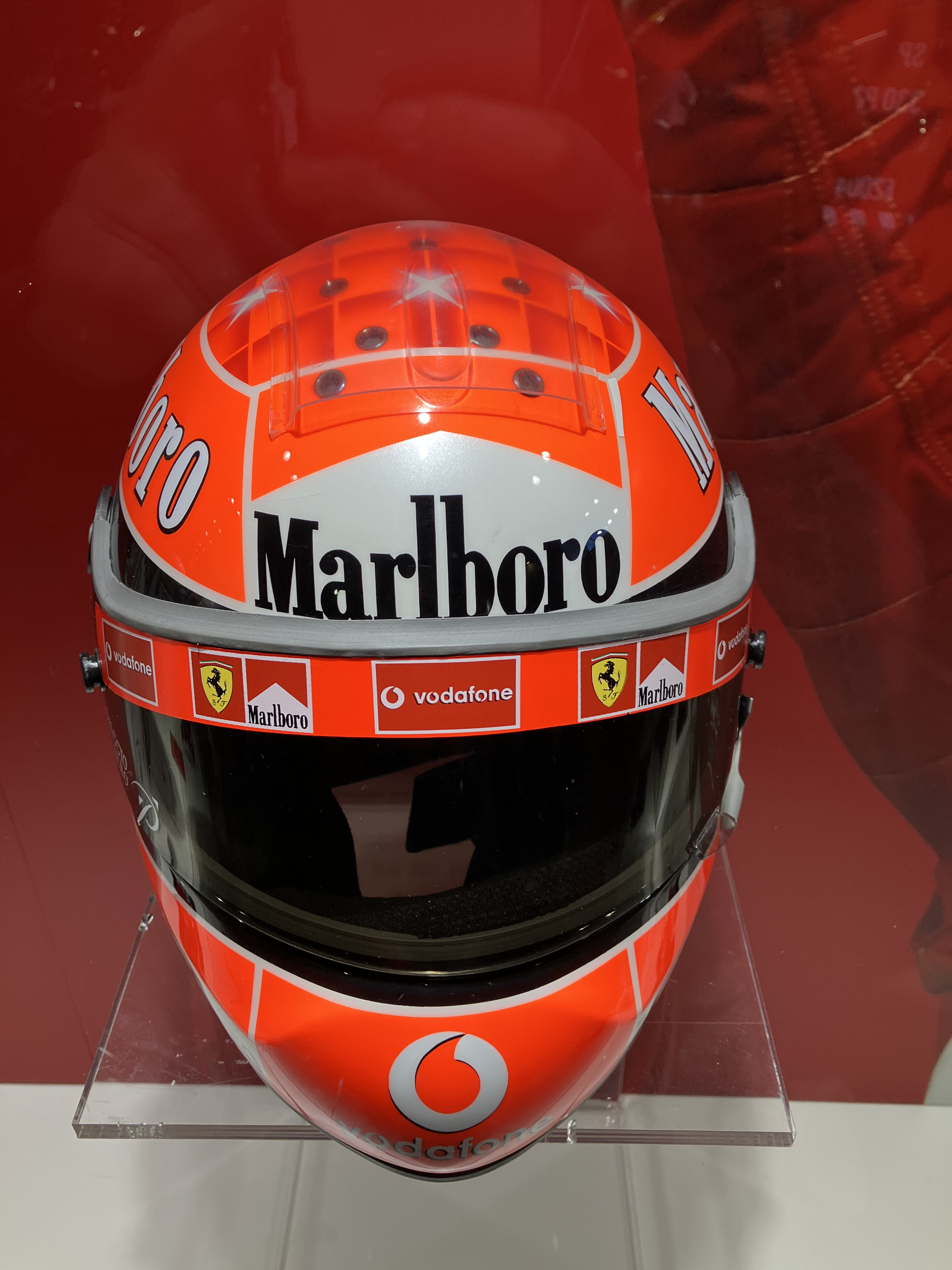
Schuberth helmet at the Museo Ferrari with the Marlboro logo, which sometimes had to be removed in countries where tobacco advertising was illegal

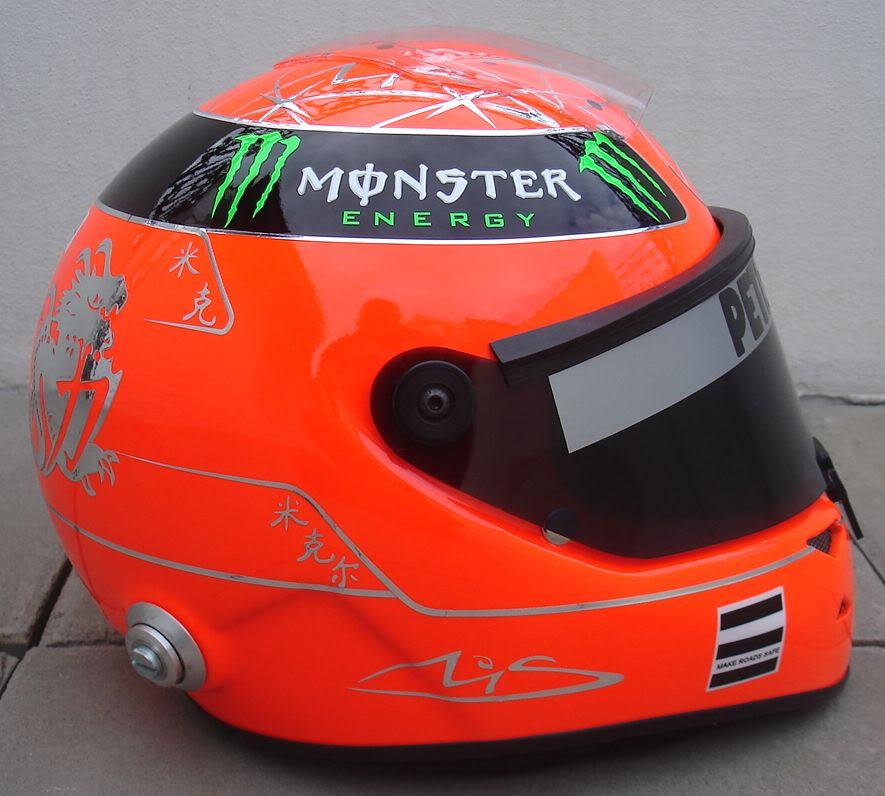
Schuberth helmet for the 2011 season (Mercedes GP); Schumacher kept using a red-coloured helmet at Silver Arrows. Chinese dragon illustration and a Chinese character (力, which stands for "power") are inscribed on the back of the helmet.

=== Legacy ===
Schumacher's three-decade career had a profound effect on motorsport in general and Formula One in particular, and his influence went beyond his own racing career; in 2020, he was voted the most influential person in Formula One history. Andrea Stella, performance engineer at Ferrari during the 2000s, said that Schumacher's influence is "felt in the DNA of Formula One. How we plan, how we analyse, how we work — it all started with him."

During a large part of his Formula One career, Schumacher was the president of the Grand Prix Drivers' Association, a representative body originally set up in 1961 that had been disbanded in 1982 and Schumacher had helped to relaunch in 1994. Schumacher has also often been credited with popularising Formula One worldwide, especially in Germany, where it was formerly considered a fringe sport. When Schumacher first retired in 2006, three of the top ten drivers in that year's Drivers' standings were German, more than any other nationality. Younger German drivers, such as Vettel, felt Schumacher was key in them becoming Formula One drivers. Schumacher was also credited for turning Ferrari into Formula One's most successful team; multi-time World Champion Jackie Stewart believed the transformation of the Ferrari team was Schumacher's greatest feat.

By the time of his first retirement in 2006 and his final retirement in 2012, Schumacher was widely considered among the greatest Formula One drivers, a trend that continued into the 2020s. Several commentators and drivers, including among others multi-time World Champions Lauda and Vettel, former drivers Coulthard, Fisichella, and Mercedes team bosses Ross Brawn and Toto Wolff, have at times described him as the greatest of all time. Schumacher has been described as statistically the most successful driver in Formula One history and the most complete Formula One driver ever. Objective mathematical models, such as Eichenberger and Stadelmann (2009, 3rd), original F1metrics (2014, 4th), Bell et al. (2015, 3rd), FiveThirtyEight (2018, 2nd), and updated F1metrics (2019, 1st), put Schumacher consistently among the top five greatest Formula One drivers ever.

== Personal life ==
In August 1995, Schumacher married Corinna Betsch. They have two children, a daughter Gina-Maria (born 1997) and a son, Mick (born 1999). Schumacher has always been very protective of his private life and is known to dislike the celebrity spotlight. From 1992 to 1996, Schumacher resided in the Fontvieille district in Monaco before moving to Vufflens-le-Château, Switzerland. While in Monaco, he was a neighbour of multiple motorcycle road racing World Champion Mick Doohan, and the two developed a friendship. The Schumacher family moved to a newly built mansion near Gland, Switzerland, in 2007, covering an area of 650 square metres (7,000 sq ft) with a private beach on Lake Geneva and featuring an underground garage and petrol station, with a vintage Shell fuel pump. Schumacher and his wife own horse ranches in Texas and Switzerland.

Schumacher's younger brother Ralf, his son Mick, his nephew David, and step-brother Sebastian Stahl have also been racing drivers. Ralf competed in Formula One for ten years, starting from 1997 until the end of 2007. Mick became the third Schumacher to race in Formula One, making his debut with Haas in the 2021 season.

Before his skiing accident in 2013, Schumacher's main hobbies included horse riding, motorcycle racing, sky diving, and playing football for his local team FC Echichens. Schumacher appeared in several charity football games, and organised games between Formula One drivers. In 2008, Schumacher declined an offer from Sammarinese football club SS Murata to join their squad for their upcoming UEFA Champions League qualifying matches. He is a supporter of 1. FC Köln, the local football club when he grew up.

Schumacher is a Roman Catholic. In 2005, he, Barrichello, and other Ferrari employees met John Paul II. They gave him a miniature replica of the Ferrari F2004, the car in which Schumacher won his seventh world title. Months later, Pope Benedict XVI was presented with the steering wheel of the F2004, which was autographed by Schumacher. Archbishop Georg Gänswein visited Schumacher in mid-2018.

In 2006, Schumacher voiced a Ferrari F430 in the Disney/Pixar film Cars, and cameoed as a chariot driver in the French film Asterix at the Olympic Games. In 2009, he appeared on the BBC motoring programme Top Gear as the Stig. Presenter Jeremy Clarkson hinted later in the programme that Schumacher was not the regular Stig, which the BBC subsequently confirmed. Schumacher was present because Ferrari did not let anyone else drive the unique black Ferrari FXX shown in the programme. He is the subject of the 2021 Netflix documentary film Schumacher.

=== Finance and sponsorship ===
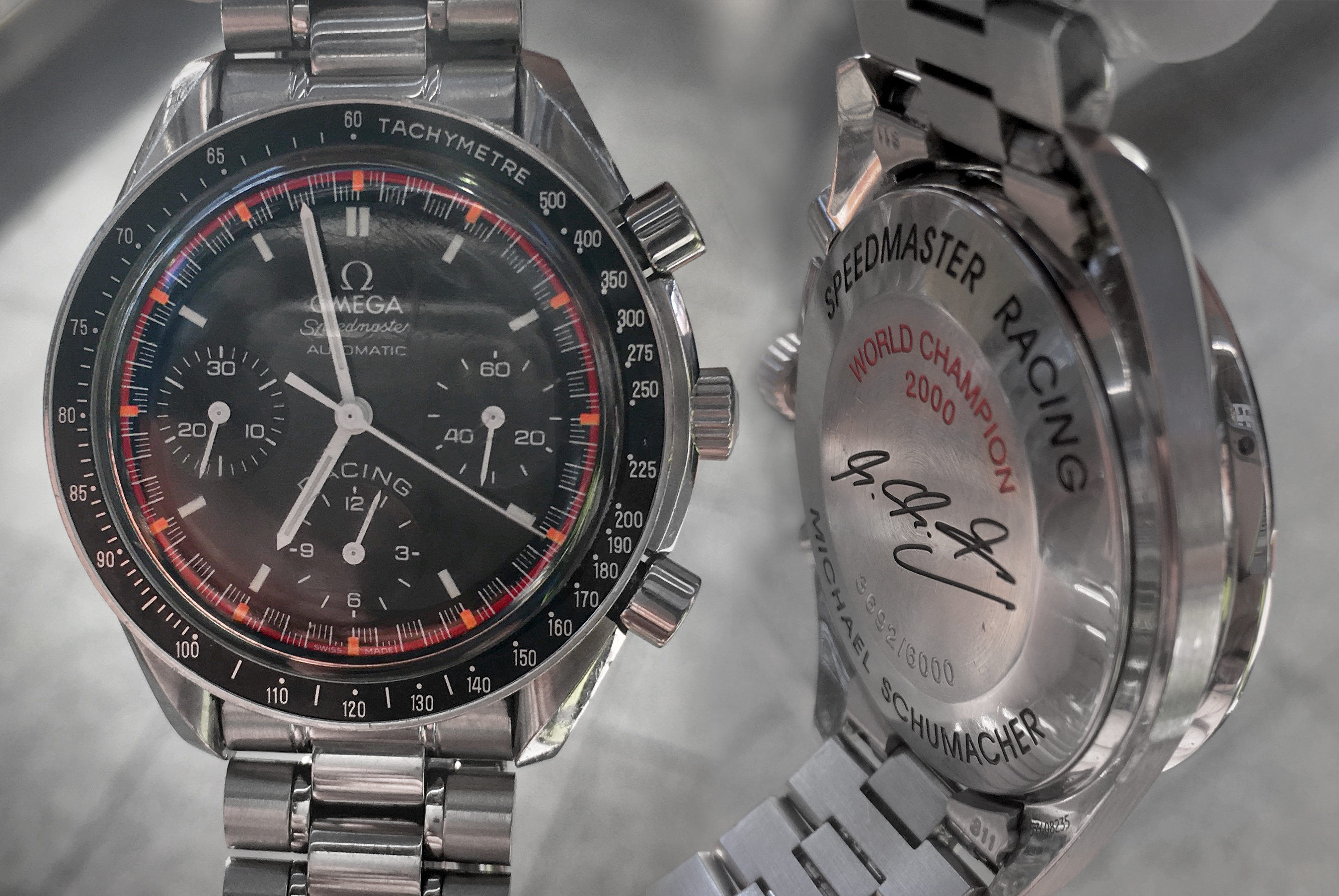
Schumacher was an advertising partner for watchmaker Omega SA. When he won his third title in 2000, which was the first with Ferrari, the Speedmaster Racing was issued in a Schumacher Edition having his signature on the back.

In 1999 and 2000, Forbes listed him as the highest paid athlete in the world. In 2005, EuroBusiness identified Schumacher as the world's first billionaire athlete. In 2005, Forbes ranked him 17th in its "The World's Most Powerful Celebrities" list. A significant share of his income came from advertising; Deutsche Vermögensberatung paid him $8 million over three years from 1999 for wearing a 10 by 8 centimetre advertisement on his post-race cap. In 2010, his personal fortune was estimated at £515 million. In 2017, Forbes designated Schumacher as the athlete with the fifth highest career earnings of all-time.

=== Philanthropy ===
Schumacher was a special ambassador to UNESCO and has donated €1.5 million to the organisation. Additionally, he paid for the construction of a school for poor children and for area improvements in Dakar, Senegal. He supported a hospital for child victims of the siege in Sarajevo, which specialises in caring for amputees. In Lima, Peru, he funded the Palace for the Poor, a centre for helping homeless children obtain an education, clothing, food, medical attention, and shelter. Schumacher told F1 Magazine: "It's great if you can use your fame and the power your fame gives you to draw attention to things that really matter."

For the 2002 European floods, Schumacher donated €1 million; years later, Schumacher did the same when he donated €500,000 after the 2013 European floods. He donated $10 million for aid after the 2004 Indian Ocean earthquake, which surpassed that of any other sports person, most sports leagues, many worldwide corporations and even some countries. From 2002 to 2006, he donated at least $50 million to various charities. In 2008, he donated between $5 million and $10 million to the Clinton Foundation.

Since his participation in an FIA European road safety campaign, as part of his punishment after the collision at the 1997 European Grand Prix, Schumacher continued to support other campaigns, such as Make Roads Safe, which is led by the FIA Foundation and calls on G8 countries and the United Nations to recognise global road deaths as a major global health issue. In 2008, Schumacher was the figurehead of an advertising campaign by Bacardi to raise awareness about responsible drinking through television, cinema and online media, supported by consumer engagements, public relations and digital media across the world.

== 2013 skiing accident ==
On 29 December 2013, Schumacher was skiing with his then 14-year-old son Mick, descending the Combe de Saulire below the Dent de Burgin above Méribel in the French Alps. An experienced skier, while crossing an unsecured off-piste area between Piste Chamois and Piste Mauduit, he fell and hit his head on a rock, sustaining a serious head injury despite wearing a ski helmet. According to his physicians, he would most probably have died had he not been wearing a helmet. He was airlifted to Grenoble Hospital where he underwent two surgical interventions. He was put into a medically-induced coma because of traumatic brain injury. In early April 2014, he was showing moments of consciousness as he was gradually withdrawn from the medically induced coma.

In June 2014, he left Grenoble Hospital for further rehabilitation at the Lausanne University Hospital, Switzerland. In September 2014, he was brought home for further rehabilitation. Since his accident, there has been little public information about his condition, with his family asking for privacy. In November 2014, it was reported that he was "paralysed and in a wheelchair", and that he "cannot speak and has memory problems". In May 2015, Schumacher's manager Sabine Kehm stated that his condition was slowly improving "considering the severeness of the injury he had".

In September 2016, Felix Damm, lawyer for Schumacher, told a German court that his client "cannot walk", in response to reports from December 2015 in German publication Die Bunte that he could walk again. In July 2019, former Ferrari manager Jean Todt stated that Schumacher was making "good progress" but also "struggles to communicate". Todt also said that Schumacher was able to watch Formula One races on television at his home. In September 2019, Le Parisien reported that Schumacher had been admitted to the Hôpital Européen Georges-Pompidou in Paris for treatment by cardiovascular surgeon Philippe Menasché, described as a "pioneer in cell surgery". Following the treatment, which involved him receiving an anti-inflammatory stem cell perfusion, medical staff stated that he was "conscious".

His family has maintained strict privacy about his condition since his accident in 2013. In April 2023, Die Aktuelle published without permission what it advertised as a "first interview" with him, including quotes from him about his health and family; it stated only at the end that these responses had been fabricated using generative AI. Schumacher's family said that they would sue the magazine, which fired the editor responsible; they ultimately reached a settlement, with the magazine's owner paying the Schumacher family €200,000. In February 2025, Schumacher's former bodyguard, Markus Fritsche, was given a two-year suspended sentence for stealing images, videos and medical records and passing them to Yilmaz Tozturkan, who threatened to "upload them on to the dark web" unless the Schumacher family paid money. Tozturkan, a nightclub bouncer, was sentenced to three years in prison, and his son was given a six-month suspended sentence.

== Honours and achievements ==
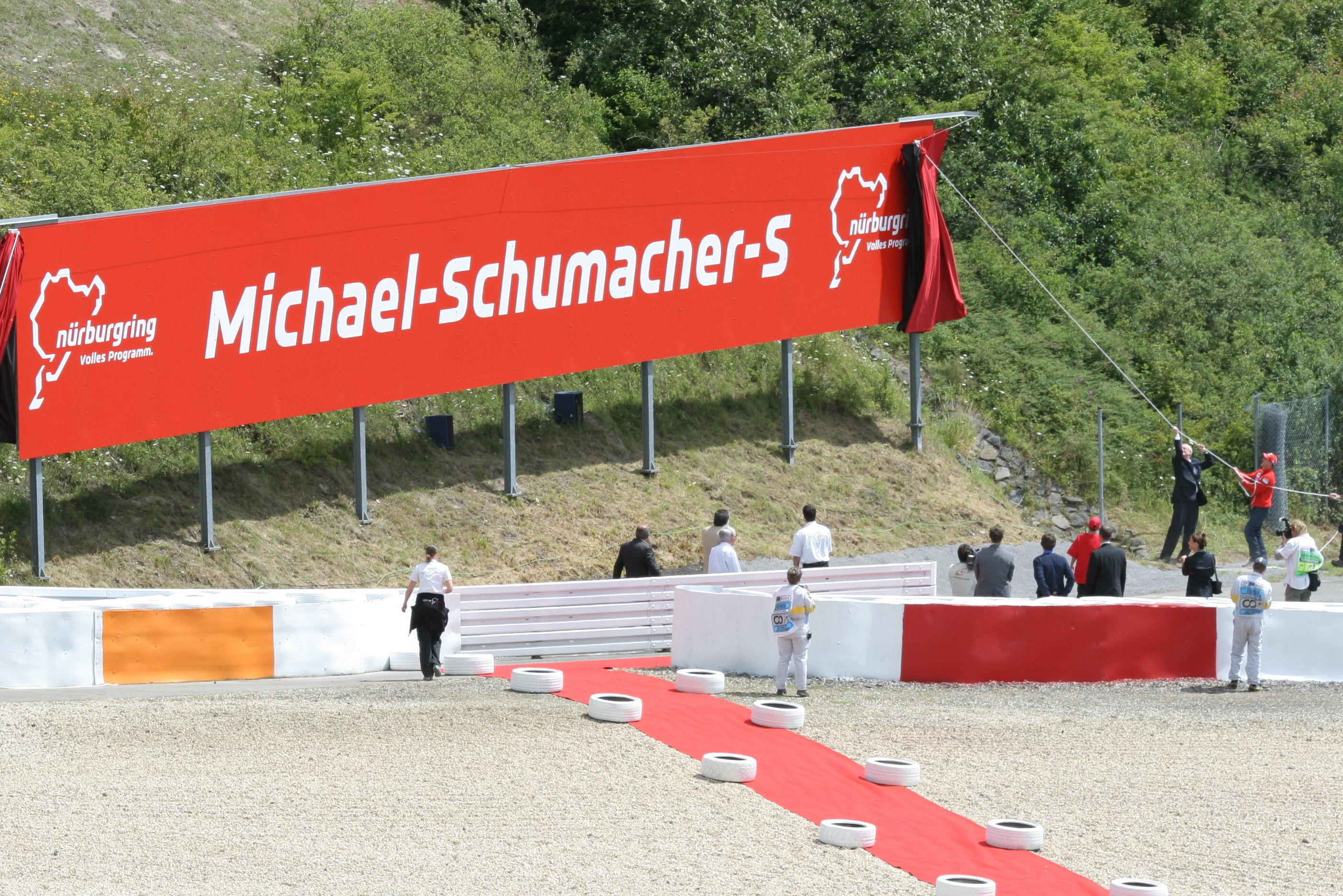
Turns 9 and 10 of the Nürburgring were renamed after Schumacher in 2007.

Schumacher has been honoured many times. In 1992, 1994, 1995 and 2002, the German Motor Sport Federation awarded him the ONS Cup, German motorsport's highest accolade. In 1993, he won a Bambi Award (Sports) and was the first racing driver to receive the Golden Steering Wheel. In 1994 and from 2001 to 2003, Schumacher was voted European Sportsperson of the Year by the International Sports Press Association. He was voted by Polish Press Agency the European Sportsperson of the Year from 2001 to 2003. In 1995 and from 2000 to 2002, he was named Autosport International Racing Driver of the Year. Schumacher was voted German Sportspersonality of the Year in 1995 and 2004. During the latter year, he was voted Germany's greatest sportsperson of the 20th century, beating Birgit Fischer and Steffi Graf to the accolade. For his sports achievements and his commitment to road safety, Schumacher was awarded Germany's highest sporting accolade, the Silbernes Lorbeerblatt, in 1997. In 2002, for his contributions to sport and his contributions in raising awareness of child education, Schumacher was named as one of the UNESCO Champions for Sport.

Schumacher won the Laureus World Sportsman of the Year in 2002 and 2004, received the Marca Leyenda award in 2001, was named L'Équipe Champion of Champions three times (from 2001 to 2003), won the Gazzetta World Sports Award twice (2001 and 2002), and won the 2003 Lorenzo Bandini Trophy. In honour of Schumacher's racing career and his efforts to improve road safety and the sport, he was awarded an FIA Gold Medal for Motor Sport in 2006. The same year, ahead of his final race for Ferrari in Brazil on 22 October, football player Pelé presented a "Lifetime Achievement Award" to Schumacher. In 2007, he received the Prince of Asturias Award for Sport for his sporting prowess and his humanitarian record. Together with Vettel, Schumacher won the Race of Champions Nations' Cup six times in a row for Germany, from 2007 to 2012. In 2017, Schumacher was inducted into the FIA Hall of Fame and Germany's Sports Hall of Fame. In 2020, Todt honoured Schumacher with the FIA President Award, in recognition of Schumacher's seven World Championships and the "inspiration his sporting and personal commitments brought to the world".

The Assembly of the Sarajevo Canton renamed a major city street after Schumacher, and earlier a group of artists painted a large street mural in Dobrinja. Maranello, Modena, Spa, and Sarajevo, granted honorary citizenship. He was appointed Chevalier de la Légion d'honneur, made a Commander of the Order of Merit of the Italian Republic, and was appointed an ambassador of San Marino. In 2008, the Swiss Football Association appointed Schumacher as the country's ambassador for UEFA Euro 2008, hosted by Switzerland and Austria. In recognition of his contribution to Formula One, the Nürburgring Circuit renamed turns 9 and 10 as the Schumacher S in 2007. In 2014, the first corner of the Bahrain International Circuit was renamed in honour of Schumacher. In 2026, turn 12 of the Hungaroring was named in honor of Schumacher. He was awarded the State Prize of North Rhine-Westphalia in 2022.

== Karting record ==
=== Karting career summary ===
Season	Series	Team	Position
1984	CIK-FIA Junior World Cup – ICA		NC
1984	German Championship – Junior		1st
1985	CIK-FIA Junior World Cup – ICA		2nd
1985	German Championship – Junior		1st
1986	German Championship – Senior		3rd
1987	German Championship – Senior		1st
1987	CIK-FIA European Championship – 100cc		1st
1994	Masters of Paris-Bercy – F1 Stars		1st
1996	CIK-FIA Monaco Kart Cup – FA		1st
1996	Masters of Paris-Bercy – CIK		1st
2001	CIK-FIA World Championship – FSA	Tony Kart	21st
2007	Desafio Internacional das Estrelas		1st
2008	Desafio Internacional das Estrelas		8th
2009	SKUSA SuperNationals – SuperPro		9th
2009	Desafio Internacional das Estrelas		1st

== Racing record ==
=== Career summary ===
Season	Series	Team	Races	Wins	Poles	F/Laps	Podiums	Points	Position
1988	European Formula Ford 1600	Eufra Racing	4	1	1	0	3	50	**2nd**
1988	German Formula Ford 1600	Eufra Racing	7	3	0	0	5	124	6th
1988	Formula König	Hoecker Sportwagenservice	10	9	1	1	10	192	**1st**
1989	German Formula Three	WTS Racing	12	2	2	0	7	163	**3rd**
1989	FIA European Formula 3 Cup	WTS Racing	1	0	0	0	0	N/A	NC
1989	Macau Grand Prix	WTS Racing	1	0	0	0	0	N/A	NC
1990	World Sportscar Championship	Team Sauber Mercedes	3	1	0	1	3	21	5th
1990	German Formula Three	WTS Racing	11	5	6	4	7	148	**1st**
1990	FIA European Formula 3 Cup	WTS Racing	1	0	1	1	0	N/A	NC
1990	Macau Grand Prix	WTS Racing	1	1	0	0	0	N/A	**1st**
1990	Deutsche Tourenwagen Meisterschaft	HWA AG	1	0	0	0	0	0	NC
1991	Formula One	Team 7UP Jordan	1	0	0	0	0	0	14th
1991	Formula One	Camel Benetton Ford	5	0	0	0	0	4	14th
1991	World Sportscar Championship	Team Sauber Mercedes	8	1	0	2	2	43	9th
1991	Deutsche Tourenwagen Meisterschaft	Zakspeed Racing	4	0	0	0	0	0	NC
1991	Japanese Formula 3000	Team LeMans	1	0	0	0	1	6	12th
1992	Formula One	Camel Benetton Ford	16	1	0	2	8	53	**3rd**
1993	Formula One	Camel Benetton Ford	16	1	0	5	9	52	4th
1994	Formula One	Mild Seven Benetton Ford	14	8	6	8	10	92	**1st**
1995	Formula One	Mild Seven Benetton Renault	17	9	4	8	11	102	**1st**
1996	Formula One	Scuderia Ferrari S.p.A.	16	3	4	2	8	59	**3rd**
1997	Formula One	Scuderia Ferrari Marlboro	17	5	3	3	8	78	DSQ
1998	Formula One	Scuderia Ferrari Marlboro	16	6	3	6	11	86	**2nd**
1999	Formula One	Scuderia Ferrari Marlboro	10	2	3	5	6	44	5th
2000	Formula One	Scuderia Ferrari Marlboro	17	9	9	2	12	108	**1st**
2001	Formula One	Scuderia Ferrari Marlboro	17	9	11	3	14	123	**1st**
2002	Formula One	Scuderia Ferrari Marlboro	17	11	7	7	17	144	**1st**
2003	Formula One	Scuderia Ferrari Marlboro	16	6	5	5	8	93	**1st**
2004	Formula One	Scuderia Ferrari Marlboro	18	13	8	10	15	148	**1st**
2005	Formula One	Scuderia Ferrari Marlboro	19	1	1	3	5	62	**3rd**
2006	Formula One	Scuderia Ferrari Marlboro	18	7	4	7	12	121	**2nd**
2010	Formula One	Mercedes GP Petronas F1 Team	19	0	0	0	0	72	9th
2011	Formula One	Mercedes GP Petronas F1 Team	19	0	0	0	0	76	8th
2012	Formula One	Mercedes-AMG Petronas F1 Team	20	0	0	1	1	49	13th

=== Complete German Formula Three results ===
(key) (Races in bold indicate pole position) (Races in italics indicate fastest lap)

Year	Entrant	Engine	1	2	3	4	5	6	7	8	9	10	11	12	DC	Pts
1989	WTS Racing	Volkswagen	HOC; 3	NÜR; 3	AVU; 3	BRN; 5	**ZEL**; 1	HOC; 3	WUN; 12	HOC; 19	DIE; 4	NÜR; 5	**NÜR**; 1	HOC; 3	**3rd**	**163**
1990	WTS Racing	Opel	**ZOL**; Ret	**HOC**; 19	NÜR; 5	AVU; 1	**WUN**; 1	NOR; 2	**ZEL**; 1	DIE; 1	**NÜR**; 1	**NÜR**; 4	HOC; 2		**1st**	**148**

=== Complete World Sportscar Championship results ===
(key) (Races in bold indicate pole position; races in italics indicate fastest lap)

Year	Entrant	Class	Chassis	Engine	1	2	3	4	5	6	7	8	9	Pos.	Pts
1990	Team Sauber Mercedes	C	Mercedes-Benz C11	Mercedes-Benz M119 5.0 V8 t	SUZ	MNZ	SIL; DNQ	SPA	DIJ; 2	NÜR; 2	DON	CGV	MEX; 1	5th	21
1991	Team Sauber Mercedes	C1	Mercedes-Benz C291	Mercedes-Benz M291 3.5 F12	SUZ; Ret	MNZ; Ret	SIL; 2		NÜR; Ret	MAG; Ret	MEX; Ret	AUT; 1		7th	43
1991	Team Sauber Mercedes	C2	Mercedes-Benz C11	Mercedes-Benz M119 5.0 V8 t				LMS; 5						7th	43

=== Complete Deutsche Tourenwagen Meisterschaft results ===
Year	Team	Car	1	2	3	4	5	6	7	8	9	10	11	12	13	14	15	16	17	18	19	20	21	22	23	24	Pos.	Pts
1990	AMG Motorenbau GmbH	Mercedes 190 E 2.5–16 Evo II	ZOL; 1	ZOL; 2	HOC; 1	HOC; 2	NÜR; 1	NÜR; 2	AVU; 1	AVU; 2	MFA; 1	MFA; 2	WUN; 1	WUN; 2	NÜR; 1	NÜR; 2	NOR; 1	NOR; 2	DIE; 1	DIE; 2	NÜR; 1	NÜR; 2	HOC; 1 Ret	HOC; 2 DNS			NC	0
1991	Zakspeed Racing	Mercedes 190 E 2.5–16 Evo II	ZOL; 1	ZOL; 2	HOC; 1	HOC; 2	NÜR; 1	NÜR; 2	AVU; 1	AVU; 2	WUN; 1	WUN; 2	NOR; 1; 25	NOR; 2 Ret	DIE; 1 Ret	DIE; 2; 14	NÜR; 1	NÜR; 2	ALE; 1	ALE; 2	HOC; 1	HOC; 2	BRN; 1	BRN; 2	DON; 1	DON; 2	NC	0
Source: Key

=== 24 Hours of Le Mans results ===
Year	Team	Co-drivers	Car	Class	Laps	Pos.	Class pos.
1991	(Germany) Team Sauber Mercedes	(Austria) Karl Wendlinger (Germany) Fritz Kreutzpointner	Mercedes-Benz C11	C2	355	5th	5th

=== Complete Japanese Formula 3000 Championship results ===
(key)

Year	Entrant	Chassis	Engine	1	2	3	4	5	6	7	8	9	10	11	Pos.	Pts
1991	Team LeMans	Ralt RT23	Mugen	SUZ	AUT	FUJ	MIN	SUZ	SUG; 2	FUJ	SUZ	FUJ	SUZ	FUJ	12th	6

=== Complete Formula One results ===
(key) (Races in bold indicate pole position; races in italics indicate fastest lap)

Year	Entrant	Chassis	Engine	1	2	3	4	5	6	7	8	9	10	11	12	13	14	15	16	17	18	19	20	WDC	Pts
1991	Team 7UP Jordan	Jordan 191	Ford-Cosworth HBA4 4 3.5 V8	USA	BRA	SMR	MON	CAN	MEX	FRA	GBR	GER	HUN	BEL; Ret										14th	4
1991	Camel Benetton Ford	Benetton B191	Ford-Cosworth HBA5 3.5 V8												ITA; 5	POR; 6	ESP; 6	JPN; Ret	AUS; Ret					14th	4
1992	Camel Benetton Ford	Benetton B191B	Ford-Cosworth HBA6 3.5 V8	RSA; 4	MEX; 3	BRA; 3																		**3rd**	**53**
1992	Camel Benetton Ford	Benetton B192	Ford-Cosworth HBA6 3.5 V8				ESP; 2	SMR; Ret	MON; 4	CAN; 2	FRA; Ret	GBR; 4	GER; 3	HUN; Ret	BEL; 1	ITA; 3	POR; 7	JPN; Ret	AUS; 2					**3rd**	**53**
1993	Camel Benetton Ford	Benetton B193	Ford-Cosworth HBA7 3.5 V8	RSA; Ret	BRA; 3																			4th	52
1993	Camel Benetton Ford	Benetton B193B	Ford-Cosworth HBA7 3.5 V8			EUR; Ret	SMR; 2	ESP; 3	MON; Ret	CAN; 2	FRA; 3	GBR; 2	GER; 2	HUN; Ret	BEL; 2	ITA; Ret	POR; 1	JPN; Ret	AUS; Ret					4th	52
1994	Mild Seven Benetton Ford	Benetton B194	Ford-Cosworth EC Zetec-R 3.5 V8	BRA; 1	PAC; 1	SMR; 1	**MON**; 1	**ESP**; 2	**CAN**; 1	FRA; 1	GBR; DSQ	GER; Ret	**HUN**; 1	BEL; DSQ	ITA	POR	**EUR**; 1	**JPN**; 2	AUS; Ret					**1st**	**92**
1995	Mild Seven Benetton Renault	Benetton B195	Renault RS7 3.0 V10	BRA; 1	ARG; 3	**SMR**; Ret	**ESP**; 1	MON; 1	**CAN**; 5	FRA; 1	GBR; Ret	GER; 1	HUN; 11^{†}	BEL; 1	ITA; Ret	POR; 2	EUR; 1	PAC; 1	**JPN**; 1	AUS; Ret				**1st**	**102**
1996	Scuderia Ferrari S.p.A.	Ferrari F310	Ferrari 046 3.0 V10	AUS; Ret	BRA; 3	ARG; Ret	EUR; 2	**SMR**; 2	**MON**; Ret	ESP; 1	CAN; Ret	**FRA**; DNS	GBR; Ret	GER; 4	**HUN**; 9^{†}	BEL; 1	ITA; 1	POR; 3	JPN; 2					**3rd**	**59**
1997	Scuderia Ferrari Marlboro	Ferrari F310B	Ferrari 046/2 3.0 V10	AUS; 2	BRA; 5	ARG; Ret	SMR; 2	MON; 1	ESP; 4	**CAN**; 1	**FRA**; 1	GBR; Ret	GER; 2	**HUN**; 4	BEL; 1	ITA; 6	AUT; 6	LUX; Ret	JPN; 1	EUR; Ret				DSQ‡	78
1998	Scuderia Ferrari Marlboro	Ferrari F300	Ferrari 047 3.0 V10	AUS; Ret	BRA; 3	ARG; 1	SMR; 2	ESP; 3	MON; 10	CAN; 1	FRA; 1	GBR; 1	AUT; 3	GER; 5	HUN; 1	BEL; Ret	**ITA**; 1	**LUX**; 2	**JPN**; Ret					**2nd**	**86**
1999	Scuderia Ferrari Marlboro	Ferrari F399	Ferrari 048 3.0 V10	AUS; 8	BRA; 2	SMR; 1	MON; 1	ESP; 3	**CAN**; Ret	FRA; 5	GBR; DNS	AUT	GER	HUN	BEL	ITA	EUR	**MAL**; 2	**JPN**; 2					5th	44
2000	Scuderia Ferrari Marlboro	Ferrari F1-2000	Ferrari 049 3.0 V10	AUS; 1	BRA; 1	SMR; 1	GBR; 3	**ESP**; 5	EUR; 1	**MON**; Ret	**CAN**; 1	**FRA**; Ret	AUT; Ret	GER; Ret	**HUN**; 2	BEL; 2	**ITA**; 1	**USA**; 1	**JPN**; 1	**MAL**; 1				**1st**	**108**
2001	Scuderia Ferrari Marlboro	Ferrari F2001	Ferrari 050 3.0 V10	**AUS**; 1	**MAL**; 1	**BRA**; 2	SMR; Ret	**ESP**; 1	**AUT**; 2	MON; 1	**CAN**; 2	**EUR**; 1	FRA; 1	**GBR**; 2	GER; Ret	**HUN**; 1	BEL; 1	ITA; 4	**USA**; 2	**JPN**; 1				**1st**	**123**
2002	Scuderia Ferrari Marlboro	Ferrari F2001B	Ferrari 050 3.0 V10	AUS; 1	**MAL**; 3																			**1st**	**144**
2002	Scuderia Ferrari Marlboro	Ferrari F2002	Ferrari 051 3.0 V10			BRA; 1	**SMR**; 1	**ESP**; 1	AUT; 1	MON; 2	CAN; 1	EUR; 2	GBR; 1	FRA; 1	**GER**; 1	HUN; 2	**BEL**; 1	ITA; 2	**USA**; 2	**JPN**; 1				**1st**	**144**
2003	Scuderia Ferrari Marlboro	Ferrari F2002	Ferrari 051 3.0 V10	**AUS**; 4	MAL; 6	BRA; Ret	**SMR**; 1																	**1st**	**93**
2003	Scuderia Ferrari Marlboro	Ferrari F2003-GA	Ferrari 052 3.0 V10					**ESP**; 1	**AUT**; 1	MON; 3	CAN; 1	EUR; 5	FRA; 3	GBR; 4	GER; 7	HUN; 8	**ITA**; 1	USA; 1	JPN; 8					**1st**	**93**
2004	Scuderia Ferrari Marlboro	Ferrari F2004	Ferrari 053 3.0 V10	**AUS**; 1	**MAL**; 1	**BHR**; 1	SMR; 1	**ESP**; 1	MON; Ret	**EUR**; 1	CAN; 1	USA; 1	FRA; 1	GBR; 1	**GER**; 1	**HUN**; 1	BEL; 2	ITA; 2	CHN; 12	**JPN**; 1	BRA; 7			**1st**	**148**
2005	Scuderia Ferrari Marlboro	Ferrari F2004M	Ferrari 053 3.0 V10	AUS; Ret	MAL; 7																			**3rd**	**62**
2005	Scuderia Ferrari Marlboro	Ferrari F2005	Ferrari 055 3.0 V10			BHR; Ret	SMR; 2	ESP; Ret	MON; 7	EUR; 5	CAN; 2	USA; 1	FRA; 3	GBR; 6	GER; 5	**HUN**; 2	TUR; Ret	ITA; 10	BEL; Ret	BRA; 4	JPN; 7	CHN; Ret		**3rd**	**62**
2006	Scuderia Ferrari Marlboro	Ferrari 248 F1	Ferrari 056 2.4 V8	**BHR**; 2	MAL; 6	AUS; Ret	**SMR**; 1	EUR; 1	ESP; 2	MON; 5	GBR; 2	CAN; 2	**USA**; 1	**FRA**; 1	GER; 1	HUN; 8^{†}	TUR; 3	ITA; 1	CHN; 1	JPN; Ret	BRA; 4			**2nd**	**121**
2010	Mercedes GP Petronas F1 Team	Mercedes MGP W01	Mercedes FO 108X 2.4 V8	BHR; 6	AUS; 10	MAL; Ret	CHN; 10	ESP; 4	MON; 12	TUR; 4	CAN; 11	EUR; 15	GBR; 9	GER; 9	HUN; 11	BEL; 7	ITA; 9	SIN; 13	JPN; 6	KOR; 4	BRA; 7	ABU; Ret		9th	72
2011	Mercedes GP Petronas F1 Team	Mercedes MGP W02	Mercedes FO 108Y 2.4 V8	AUS; Ret	MAL; 9	CHN; 8	TUR; 12	ESP; 6	MON; Ret	CAN; 4	EUR; 17	GBR; 9	GER; 8	HUN; Ret	BEL; 5	ITA; 5	SIN; Ret	JPN; 6	KOR; Ret	IND; 5	ABU; 7	BRA; 15		8th	76
2012	Mercedes AMG Petronas F1 Team	Mercedes F1 W03	Mercedes FO 108Z 2.4 V8	AUS; Ret	MAL; 10	CHN; Ret	BHR; 10	ESP; Ret	MON; Ret	CAN; Ret	EUR; 3	GBR; 7	GER; 7	HUN; Ret	BEL; 7	ITA; 6	SIN; Ret	JPN; 11	KOR; 13	IND; 22^{†}	ABU; 11	USA; 16	BRA; 7	13th	49

^{‡} Schumacher was disqualified from the 1997 World Drivers' Championship due to dangerous driving in the European Grand Prix, where he caused an avoidable accident with Jacques Villeneuve. His points tally would have placed him in second place in that year's standings.
^{†} Driver did not finish the Grand Prix but was classified as he completed over 90% of the race distance.

=== Formula One records ===
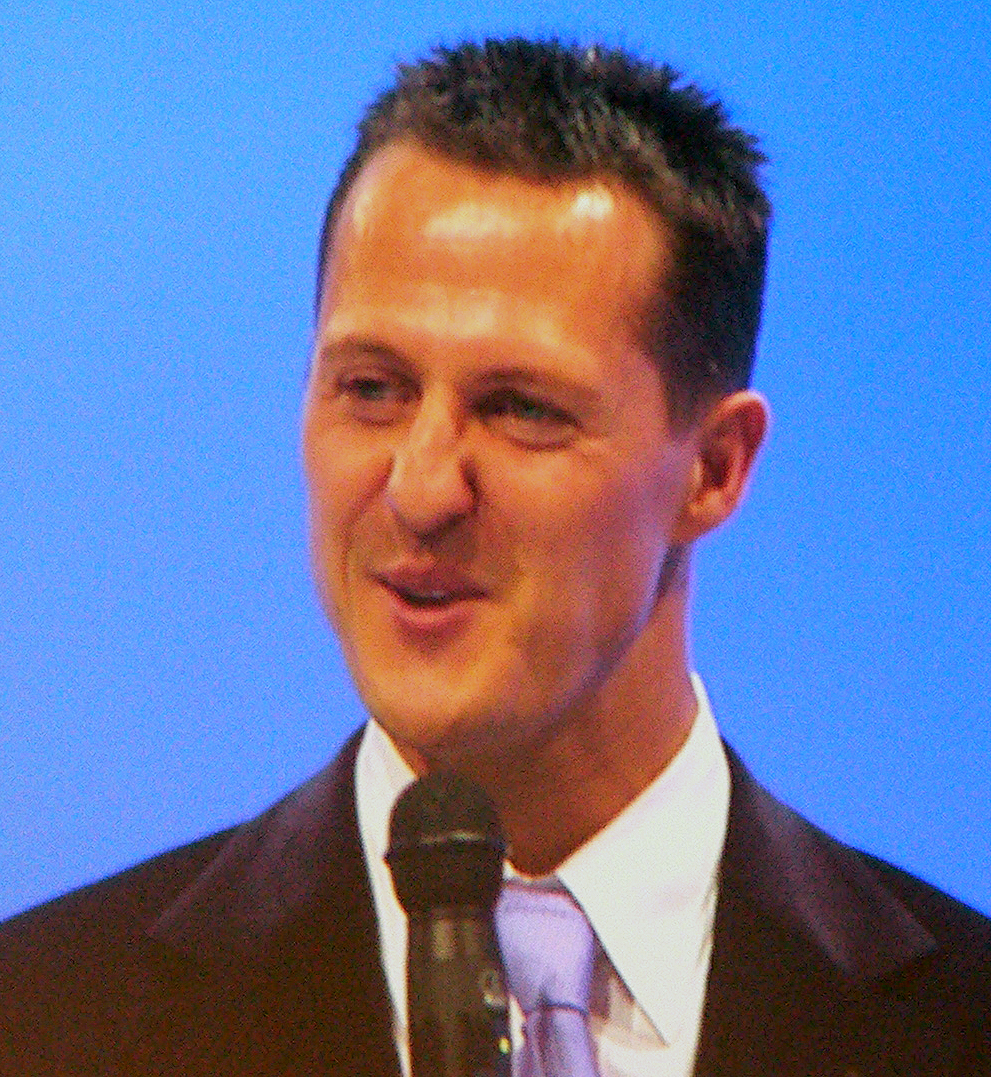
Schumacher in 2007, the year after he first retired. By this time, he had achieved most of Formula One's records.

Schumacher came to hold most major Formula One records by 2004, and by 2006 his name was inscribed in almost all of Formula One's record books, including for most World Championships (7), most wins (91), most podiums (155), most pole positions (68), and most fastest laps (77), the latter a record he still holds. Although several of his records were later equalled or beaten, such as the most wins in a season at 13 (a record he first broke in 1995 and then equalled in 2000 and 2001, and further improved in 2002 and 2004), others remain his, such as his 100% podium finish in 2002 (17), which included eleven wins, five second places, and one third place.

In 2006, Schumacher had made the most starts with the same engine manufacturer and constructor (both Ferrari, 180 starts). As teammates, he and Barrichello had the most starts (102, 2000–2005) and most 1–2 finishes (24 during the same time frame). Schumacher tied Senna for the most pole positions at the same track (eight, with Schumacher at Suzuka and Senna at Imola), and in 2004 tied Mansell for the most wins at the start of a season. He has won at least one race in 15 consecutive seasons, a record he shares with Hamilton. He also holds the records for most victories at the same track (eight, at the Magny-Cours Circuit in France) and the most victories in the same Grand Prix (eight, France). He set the record for the fastest-ever race winning average speed of 247.586 km/h (153.843 mph) at the 2003 Italian Grand Prix. By 2006, he had led 141 races and spent a record 5,108 laps in the lead. In addition, he had the most consecutive points-finishing races (24, from 2001 to 2003), the most front-row starts (115), the most points (1,369 before the point system was overhauled in 2010), and the record for the most consecutive fastest laps at the same track (7). In 2002, he became World Champion with six rounds to spare—earlier than anyone before him (21 July).

Schumacher, who dominated the sport in the 1990s and early 2000s becoming in 1995 the youngest back-to-back World Champion at the time, was noted for his ability in the rain, winning many of the wet races he took part in, most notably Spain in 1996, and for his race pace, being able to set consecutive qualifying fastest laps; due to refuelling, he missed out several pole positions, having set his race strategy through more fuel on board (from his debut in 1991 through to the end of 2002 before the introduction of race-fuel qualifying from 2003 onwards, Schumacher was only outqualified 13 times in 178 race entries), and won 23% more races than getting pole positions. He also respectively won 51 and 24 times without starting first or from the front row, and had 48 wins with fastest lap, all three being more than any other driver, and converted 40 of his pole positions to wins at 58%, a record number that was later beaten by Hamilton. By the time he first retired in 2006, with 91 wins in 248 starts out of 250 entries (only behind Patrese), Schumacher had a win ratio of 36% of starts, ahead of Senna and Prost, both of them at 25% of starts. He also had 27% of pole positions, 30% of fastest laps, and the most victories from pole with fastest lap (22). He also could have won even more races had he joined the dominant teams of the 1990s (Williams and McLaren) and not joined Ferrari in 1996, a view echoed by his former teammate Irvine, and could have become the first driver to win 100 races were it not for some situations outside his control, such as reliability issues causing him to finish lower than first in 1994, one revoked win in 1994, two collisions with Coulthard and Montoya in 1998 and 2004, the two wins he gave to Irvine and Barrichello in 1999 and 2002, and retirements at the 1993 Monaco Grand Prix, the 2006 Japanese Grand Prix, and the 2012 Monaco Grand Prix.

Record	Date first achieved	Current record
Most World Championship titles	2002	7 (Note: Record shared with Lewis Hamilton)
Most consecutive titles	2000–2004	5
Most races left in the season when becoming World Champion	2002	6 (Note: Record shared with Max Verstappen (2023))
Most consecutive seasons with a win	1992–2006	15
Most wins in a driver's home country	German Grand Prix (1995, 2002, 2004, 2006); European Grand Prix (1995, 2000, 2001, 2004, 2006)	9
Most wins not starting from pole position	2002 Australian Grand Prix	51
Most wins with fastest lap	2000 Brazilian Grand Prix	48
Most consecutive top two finishes	2002 Brazilian Grand Prix – 2002 Japanese Grand Prix	15 (Note: Record shared with Max Verstappen)
Highest percentage of podium finishes in a season	2002	100%
Most consecutive podium finishes	2001 United States Grand Prix – 2002 Japanese Grand Prix	19
Most consecutive podium finishes from first race of season	2002 Australian Grand Prix – 2002 Japanese Grand Prix	17
Most fastest laps	2001 Australian Grand Prix	77
Most fastest laps in a season	2004	10 (Note: Record shared with Kimi Räikkönen (2005 and 2008))
Most fastest laps at the same Grand Prix	Spanish Grand Prix (1993, 1994, 1996, 1999, 2001, 2002, 2004)	7 (Note: Record shared with Nigel Mansell (British Grand Prix) and Lewis Hamilton (Italian Grand Prix))
Most fastest laps at the same circuit	Barcelona-Catalunya (1993, 1994, 1996, 1999, 2001, 2002, 2004)	7 (Note: Record shared with Lewis Hamilton (Monza))
Most fastest laps in a driver's home country	German Grand Prix (1993, 1995, 2002, 2006, 2012); European Grand Prix (1995, 2000, 2002, 2004, 2006)	10
Most hat-tricks (pole, win, and fastest lap)	2002 Japanese Grand Prix	22

Footnotes

== See also ==
- 15761 Schumi
- Forbes list of the world's highest-paid athletes
- Formula One drivers from Germany
- Michael Schumacher Racing World Kart 2002

== Bibliography ==
- Allen, James (1999). Michael Schumacher: Driven to Extremes. Bantam Books. ISBN 978-0-553-81214-5.
- Allen, James (2007). Edge of Greatness. Headline. ISBN 978-0-7553-1678-6.
- Collings, Timothy (2004). The Piranha Club. Virgin Books. ISBN 978-0-7535-0965-4.
- Collings, Timothy (2005). Team Schumacher. Highdown. ISBN 978-1-905156-03-0.
- Domenjoz, Luc (2002). Michael Schumacher: Rise of a genius. Parragon. ISBN 978-0-7525-9228-2.
- Henry, Alan, ed. (1992). Autocourse 1992–93. Hazleton Publishing. ISBN 978-0-905138-96-1.
- Henry, Alan (1996). Wheel to Wheel: Great Duels of Formula One Racing. Weidenfeld Nicolson Illustrated. ISBN 978-0-7538-0522-0.
- Hilton, Christopher (2003). Michael Schumacher: The greatest of all. Haynes. ISBN 978-1-84425-044-8.
- Hilton, Christopher (2006). Michael Schumacher: The Whole Story. Haynes. ISBN 978-1-84425-008-0.
- Kehm, Sabine (2003). Michael Schumacher. Driving Force. Random House. ISBN 978-0-09-189435-1.
- Matchett, Steve (1995). Life in the Fast Lane: The Story of the Benetton Grand Prix Year. London: Weidenfeld and Nicolson. ISBN 978-0-297-81610-2.
- Matchett, Steve (1999). The Mechanic's Tale: Life in the Pit Lanes of Formula One. Osceola, Wisconsin: MBI Pub. ISBN 978-0-7603-0754-0.
- Mol, Olav; Houben, Erik (2025). Michael Schumacher: De Formule 1-legende (in Dutch). Amsterdam: Uitgeverij Het Spectrum. ISBN 978-9-0003-9342-8.
- Williams, Richard (1999). The Death of Ayrton Senna. Bloomsbury. ISBN 978-0-7475-4495-1.

Sporting positions
Preceded by None	Formula König champion 1988	Succeeded by Thomas Winkelhock
Preceded by Karl Wendlinger	German Formula Three champion 1990	Succeeded by Tom Kristensen
Preceded by David Brabham	Macau Grand Prix; Winner; 1990	Succeeded by David Coulthard
Preceded by Alain Prost	Formula One World Champion; 1994–1995	Succeeded by Damon Hill
Preceded by Mika Häkkinen	Formula One World Champion; 2000, 2001, 2002, 2003, 2004	Succeeded by Fernando Alonso
Preceded by Heikki Kovalainen; Marcus Grönholm	Race of Champions; Nations' Cup; 2007, 2008, 2009, 2010, 2011, 2012	Succeeded by Tom Kristensen; Petter Solberg (2014)
Preceded by Felipe Massa	Desafio Internacional das Estrelas; Winner; 2007	Succeeded by Rubens Barrichello
Preceded by Rubens Barrichello	Desafio Internacional das Estrelas; Winner; 2009	Succeeded by Lucas di Grassi
Awards
Preceded by Markus Wasmeier	German Sportsman of the Year; 1995	Succeeded by Frank Busemann
Preceded by Damon Hill	Autosport; International Driver of the Year; 1995	Succeeded by Damon Hill
Preceded by Mika Häkkinen	Autosport; International Driver of the Year; 2000–2002	Succeeded by Juan Pablo Montoya
Preceded by Tiger Woods	L'Équipe Champion of Champions; 2001–2003	Succeeded by Hicham El Guerrouj
Preceded by Tiger Woods	Laureus World Sportsman of the Year; 2002	Succeeded by Lance Armstrong (rescinded)
Preceded by Juan Pablo Montoya	Lorenzo Bandini Trophy; 2003	Succeeded by Kimi Räikkönen
Preceded by Lance Armstrong (rescinded)	Laureus World Sportsman of the Year; 2004	Succeeded by Roger Federer
Preceded by Jan Ullrich	German Sportsman of the Year; 2004	Succeeded by Ronny Ackermann
Preceded by Spain national basketball team	Prince of Asturias Award for Sports; 2007	Succeeded by Rafael Nadal
Records
Preceded by Alain Prost; 51 wins (1980–1991, 1993)	Most Grand Prix wins 91 wins, 52nd at the 2001 Belgian GP	Succeeded by Lewis Hamilton; 106 wins, 92nd at the 2020 Portuguese GP
