= Williams FW19 =

Formula One racing car

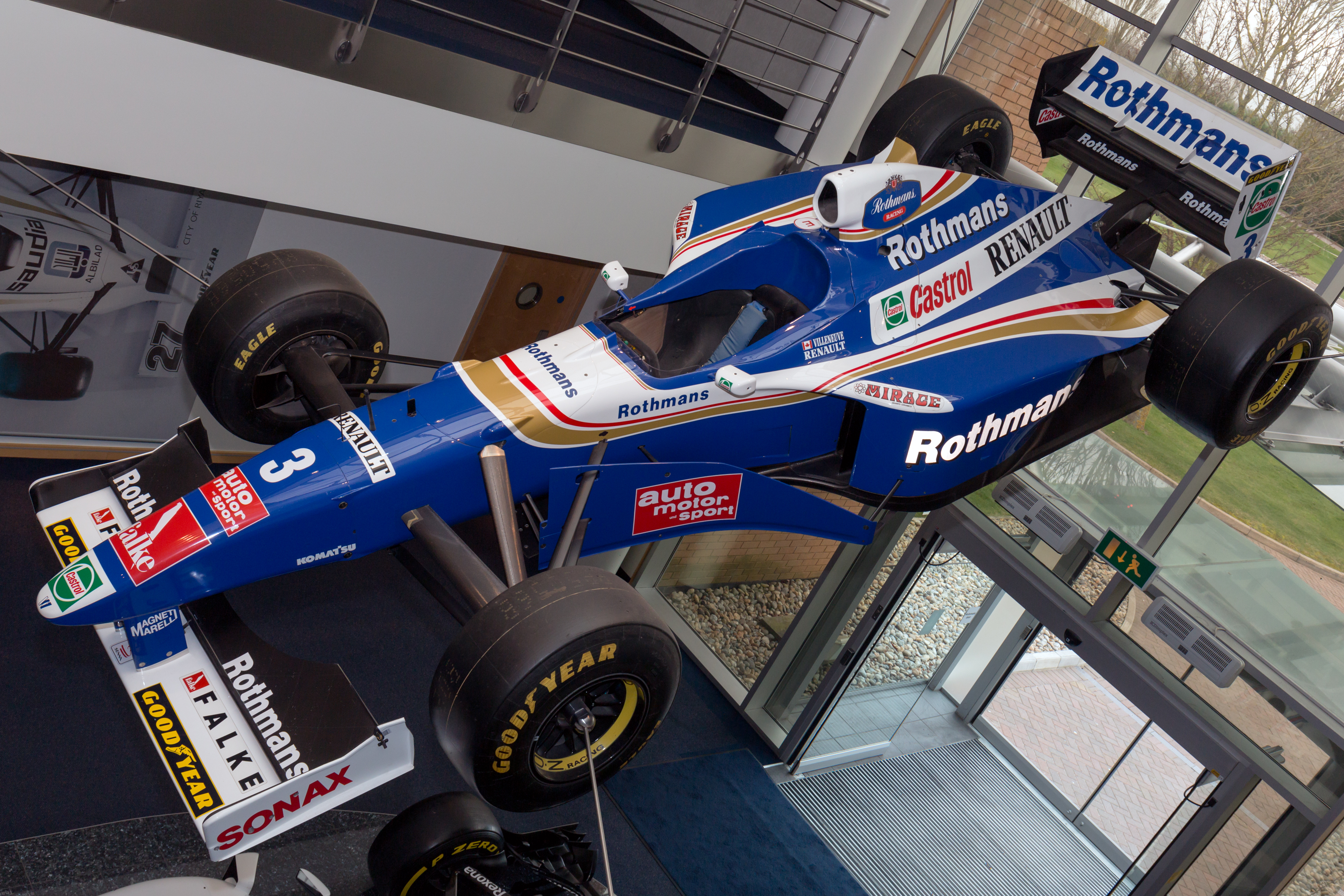
- The FW19 of Jacques Villeneuve at the Williams Conference Centre
- Category: Formula One
- Constructor: Williams (chassis); Renault Sport (engine)
- Designers: Patrick Head (Technical Director); Adrian Newey (Chief Designer); Geoff Willis (Chief Aerodynamicist); Bernard Dudot (Chief Engine Designer (Renault))
- Predecessor: Williams FW18
- Successor: Williams FW20

Technical specifications
- Chassis: Carbon-fibre and honeycomb composite structure
- Suspension (front): Williams inboard torsion bar, double wishbone, operated by a push-rod bellcrank
- Suspension (rear): Williams inboard coil-spring/double wishbone, operated by a push-rod bellcrank
- Engine: Renault RS9 / RS9A / RS9B 3.0-litre V10 (71°), naturally-aspirated, mid-engined
- Transmission: Williams/Komatsu 6-speed transverse sequential semi-automatic
- Power: 730–760 hp (544–567 kW; 740–771 PS) @ 17,000 rpm
- Fuel: Elf
- Lubricants: Castrol
- Tyres: Goodyear

Competition history
- Notable entrants: Rothmans Williams Renault
- Notable drivers: 3. (Canada) Jacques Villeneuve; 4. (Germany) Heinz-Harald Frentzen
- Debut: 1997 Australian Grand Prix
- First win: 1997 Brazilian Grand Prix
- Last win: 1997 Luxembourg Grand Prix
- Last event: 1997 European Grand Prix
Races	Wins	Podiums	Poles	F/Laps
17	8	15	11	9
- Constructors' Championships: 1 (1997)
- Drivers' Championships: 1 (1997, Jacques Villeneuve)

The Williams FW19 was the car with which the Williams team competed in the 1997 Formula One World Championship. It was driven by Jacques Villeneuve, in his second year with the team, and Heinz-Harald Frentzen, who moved from Sauber to replace the defending 1996 champion, Damon Hill who was let go before the season began. Williams also employed test drivers Jean-Christophe Boullion and Juan Pablo Montoya.

To this date, the FW19 remains the last Williams car to win either championship. It was also the last Renault-powered Formula One car to win a world championship title until the Renault R25 in 2005 and also the last Renault-powered non-full-works Formula One car outside the Enstone-based team to win a world championship title until the Red Bull RB6 in 2010.

== Design ==
The car was a logical development of the extremely successful FW18, which had comfortably won both titles in 1996. It was also the last Williams chassis to receive input from designer Adrian Newey, who left the team to join McLaren before the season began. His work was finished by Geoff Willis. The FW19 was the last Williams to run a works Renault engine before the French marque's temporary withdrawal. It also benefited from design input from Patrick Head. The new car was designed to be lighter and stiffer than the FW18. The car was the last Williams to use the highly successful naturally aspirated Renault RS9 V10 engine along with the in-house Williams gearbox. The car used Elf fuel, Castrol oil, Penske shock absorbers and AP Racing carbon disc brakes.

Villeneuve later said that the FW19 was his favourite Formula One car but that it operated best in a very small window which therefore made it tough out of which to extract the maximum performance. Furthermore, he added that the car was amazing once it got into its operating window and was especially great in qualifying as the car would reward the driver when put on the 'knife edge' of performance. Villeneuve also stated that the car was very difficult to drive in wet conditions and that it couldn't be driven fast with understeer, saying how it felt like driving on ice but with a lot of grip. Frentzen also found the car difficult to drive, and struggled setting it up to his liking all season.

== 1997 season ==
The car succeeded the 1996 FW18, which won both titles with drivers Damon Hill -who subsequently moved to Arrows- and Jacques Villeneuve, who remained with the team.

The season began in the way 1996 left off for Williams, with Villeneuve taking pole and Frentzen joining him on the front row for the opening race in Australia. Villeneuve's pole lap was particularly noteworthy as he was 1.7 seconds faster than his teammate and 2.1 seconds faster than Ferrari's Michael Schumacher in 3rd place. However, Villeneuve was in trouble right from the beginning of the race as a bad start pulled him back into the field and he was taken out by Eddie Irvine in the second Ferrari at the first corner, pushing the Williams into Johnny Herbert in the Sauber and into the gravel trap. This left Frentzen in the lead on a two stop strategy, but he was jumped by David Coulthard's one stopping McLaren after the German's second stop. He was still on for second place, however, but his brakes failed three laps from the end and it was a no score for Williams.

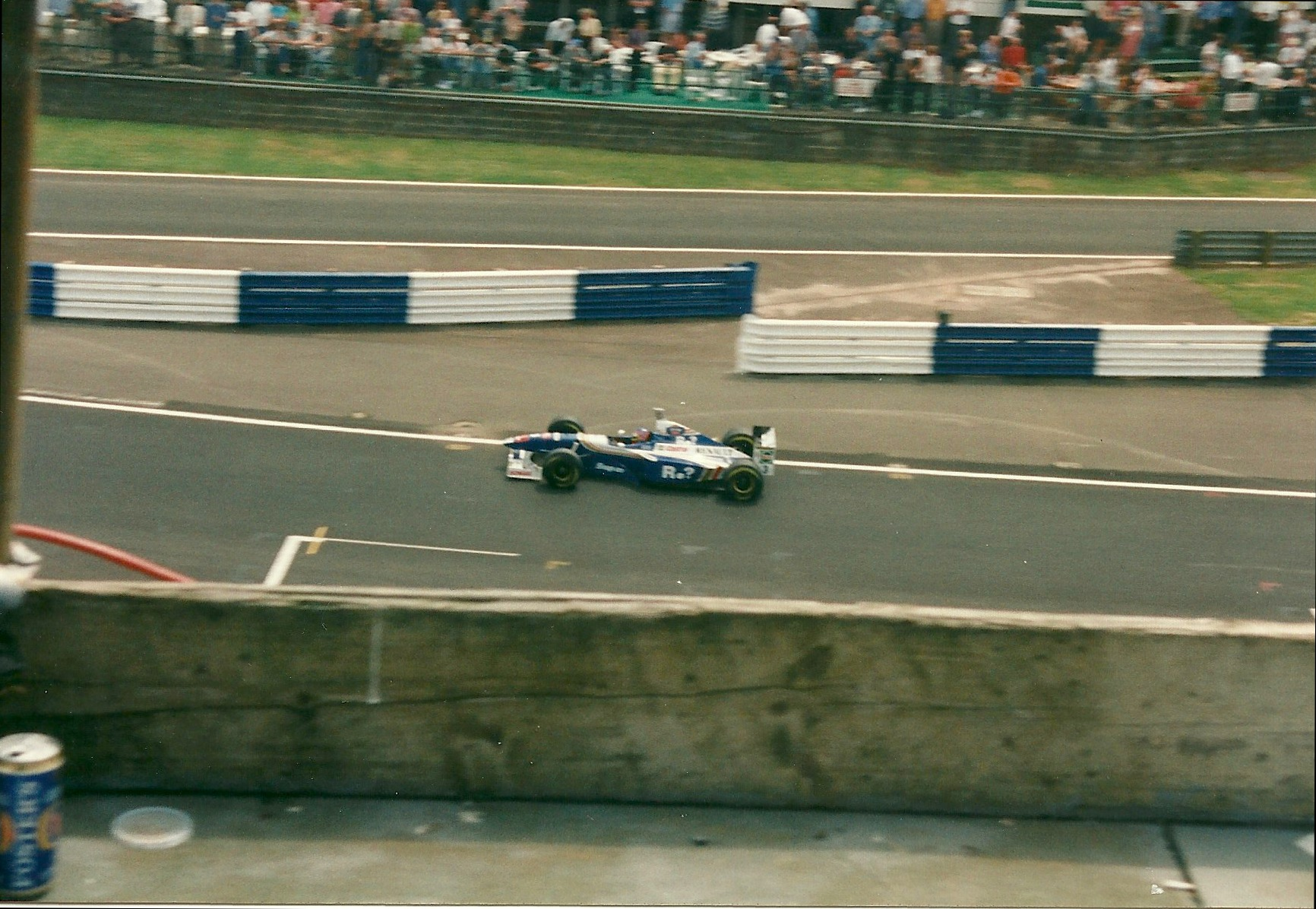
Jacques Villeneuve driving the "Ro?"-branded FW19 at the 1997 British Grand Prix.

Villeneuve took pole again in Brazil, with Frentzen down in a disappointing 8th. The Canadian led the entire race apart from three laps during the second round of pitstops and held on to take his and Williams's first win of the season. Frentzen, however, had a far more exciting race, dropping to 13th at the start, being passed by Hill, Ralf Schumacher in the Jordan, Rubens Barrichello's Stewart, Coulthard and Herbert. He repassed Barrichello and Herbert in the early laps, but remained in 11th after the first stops. The second stops were better for him, and he passed Ralf Schumacher, Hill and Coulthard, emerging in 8th. He was passed late on by Giancarlo Fisichella in the Jordan and demoted to 9th, so once again scored no points. This result left Villeneuve equal top of the championship with Coulthard and Williams equal second with Benetton and behind McLaren.

An early safety car was triggered in Argentina due to the collision between Coulthard and Ferrari's Michael Schumacher. This was good for the Williams team, who had started 1–2, with Villeneuve on pole for the third consecutive time. It didn't last very long for Frentzen, though, as his clutch broke after only five laps, meaning he had still scored no points for the season. Villeneuve was able to hold on to the lead for the vast majority of the race, with only five laps during the pitstops led by the Ferrari of Eddie Irvine. The Canadian's second win of the season left him and the team clear at the top of the championship table, despite Frentzen being yet to score.

The Grove based team locked out the front row yet again in San Marino, and Villeneuve retained his 100% pole position record for 1997. Frentzen was jumped by Michael Schumacher at the start, and the Williams cars ran 1st and 3rd until the first round of pitstops, when Villeneuve was already suffering from gearbox problems. Frentzen jumped his compatriot Schumacher and took the lead while Villeneuve dropped to 3rd with his problems. He finally retired on lap 41. Frentzen was under pressure from Schumacher to the very end, but held on to take his first ever F1 victory. Villeneuve held on to his championship lead, as did the team, and Frentzen moved up to equal third — he, Gerhard Berger of Benetton, Mika Häkkinen of McLaren, Irvine and Coulthard all had 10 points.

Frentzen took his first career pole at the Monaco Grand Prix, with Villeneuve back in third and Michael Schumacher splitting them. Villeneuve had been on course to challenge Schumacher's initial provisional pole before making a mistake at the final corner on his quickest lap and subsequently clouting the wall on the following lap, ending his session early after breaking his left rear suspension at the Sainte-Dévote corner. Rain on race day saw a wet start but Williams started their drivers on dry slick tyres, believing the rain to be only a short shower. Michael Schumacher on wet tyres jumped Frentzen at the very wet start and the Jordans of Fisichella and Ralf Schumacher also got through. Villeneuve had an awful start and was down to 9th, behind Coulthard, Herbert, Barrichello and Olivier Panis's Prost as well. Frentzen had a spin and Villeneuve had technical problems, and they were soon running 16th and 17th after pitting for wet tyres. As the rain continued to fall, they picked up places due to the accidents of Herbert and Jarno Trulli in the Minardi, Berger having to stop for a new front wing and actually passing Shinji Nakano's Prost on the racetrack. This left them in 11th and 12th with Frentzen still leading his teammate, but on lap 17 Villeneuve pulled into the pits with a problem, later identified as accident damage after a brush with the barrier at Sainte-Dévote again and retired. Frentzen picked up a place on the same lap due to Jean Alesi spinning his Benetton out of the race. The German passed Ukyo Katayama in the other Minardi a lap later, and was in 9th. He was still in 9th on lap 40 when he ran wide at the seafront chicane and bounced across the kerbs, damaging his right front suspension. He then hit the wall on the other side of the track, which caused almost identical damage to the left front suspension. He was out of the race, and the Williams Monaco challenge was over. Michael Schumacher's victory left him top of the championship by four points from Villeneuve. Frentzen had been demoted to fourth due to Eddie Irvine's 3rd place, and Williams had been bumped down to 2nd by the Ferrari performance.

The Williams cars were back on the front row in Spain, with Villeneuve on pole again. Villeneuve held position at the start despite intense pressure from Coulthard and Michael Schumacher. Frentzen, however, dropped down to 6th as the McLaren and the Ferrari swept passed him along with Alesi and Häkkinen. Frentzen had run as high as third, but by the time the second pitstops were over he was down to 8th - Herbert and Panis had got passed him as well. At the end Villeneuve was able to hold onto the lead only because Olivier Panis, an unlikely challenger, was caught in the traffic of Eddie Irvine and Jos Verstappen's Tyrrell. Frentzen was not much help to the Canadian, only moving up to 8th with a last lap move on Fisichella. This result allowed Villeneuve to move back to the lead of the championship, but meanwhile Frentzen was slipping, from 4th to 6th as Panis and Coulthard overtook him.

Round 7 of the Championship took place in Montreal, Canada, Villeneuve's home race. However, the event would mark a mid-season slump in fortunes for the team in both results and car performance. Villeneuve, having been beaten to pole position in the dying moments of qualifying by Michael Schumacher, crashed into the Wall of Champions on lap 2, thus enabling the German to record victory and retake the championship lead. Frentzen meanwhile, could only qualify and finish 4th after a lacklustre race that consisted of a poor start and 3 pit stops.

Williams would fall further behind in the title race at the French Grand Prix as Michael Schumacher recorded a dominant win from pole position, 23 seconds ahead of second placed Frentzen. The Williams cars would start and finish 2nd and 4th, Villeneuve's qualifying pace hindered by having to use the spare car after crashing his race car in Saturday mornings practice session. For Frentzen, the race was a straightforward run, unable to keep pace with Schumacher but pulling clear of Irvine's 3rd place Ferrari. Villeneuve, having dropped behind Irvine at the start after passing Schumacher's Jordan off the line, made a late switch to wet tyres in the closing laps as a late thunderstorm hit the Nevers region. Rejoining 6th, Villeneuve would repass Ralf Schumacher and Coulthard into the Adelaide hairpin before mounting a last lap challenge on Irvine's podium place. Approaching the final Lycée corner, Villeneuve looked at diving down the Ferrari's inside before dipping his rear wheel on the inside grass and spinning across the track into the pit lane entry, wiping out the entry bollards as he did so. Villeneuve would straight-line the final corner in his attempts to rejoin the track to take 4th place, which earned him a summons from the stewards who let the Canadian off with a warning. The result meant Frentzen climbed back up to 3rd in the standings while Villeneuve slipped 14 points behind Schumacher and Williams fell 13 points behind Ferrari in their respective Championships - their largest deficits of the season.

Villeneuve struck back at Silverstone, winning the British Grand Prix whilst Schumacher would retire with a wheel bearing issue, closing the Germans lead to 4 points. The Williams Renaults locked out the front row of the grid with Villeneuve ahead of Frentzen after the pair displaced Mika Häkkinen's McLaren in the final minutes of qualifying. However, Frentzen would stall on the parade lap and subsequently be forced to line up last, a hurdle he never recovered from after being punted off by Verstappen's Tyrrell on the opening lap at Becketts corner. Meanwhile, Villeneuve led away from 1st and together with Schumacher pulled away from the chasing pack in the first stint. Unfortunately, a 33-second pit stop after a wheel nut delay on the left rear tyre dropped the Canadian to 7th place whilst giving Schumacher the lead. Villeneuve would later pass Coulthard and the one stopping Benettons on his two stop strategy which, combined with Irvine's retirement promoted him to 3rd place. This became 2nd after Schumacher's demise from the lead. In the closing laps, Villeneuve rapidly closed on Häkkinen's McLaren before the Finns Mercedes engine blew out of Club corner on lap 53 of 59, thus handing Williams their 100th Formula 1 victory at the same venue as their first win at Silverstone in 1979.

Fortunes would plummet again at the German Grand Prix at Hockenheim, with Williams enduring their most uncompetitive race of the season with Frentzen and Villeneuve qualifying 5th and 9th prior to both recording driver error race retirements. Frentzen would suffer broken left front suspension after contact with Irvine's Ferrari on the first lap. Villeneuve initially benefitted from this collision and Coulthard's lap 1 excursion to run in 6th place. However, on lap 34 Villeneuve spun off from 5th place under braking for the Jim Clark chicane, beaching his Williams in the gravel. Schumacher and Ferrari's 6 points for 2nd place stretched their Drivers and Constructors Championship leads to 10 and 9 points respectively.

The title pendulum would swing back to the blue corner of Williams Renault at August's Hungarian Grand Prix, with Villeneuve's 5th win of the season and second consecutive at the Hungaroring. Villeneuve would qualify on the front row whilst Frentzen started 6th after electing to run Goodyear's harder compound tyre. Villeneuve initially made a poor start on the circuits dirty side and dropped to 5th behind Schumacher, Hill, Irvine and Häkkinen, with Frentzen behind in 6th. Villeneuve would move past Irvine for 4th with a daring move around the outside into turn 2 before being promoted to 3rd following Häkkinen's retirement. The Canadian would then pass title rival Schumacher into turn 1 to run 2nd with Frentzen 3rd following the Ferrari's first of 3 pit stops. With the majority of the Goodyear runners struggling with blistered tyres, Villeneuve would make a 2 stop strategy work, however he was unable to keep up with the scintillating pace of Hill's Bridgestone shod Arrows Yamaha. The reigning champion was also 2 stopping, and after he made his first stop, the 1 stopping Frentzen took the lead, setting the race's fastest lap. Frentzen's hard tyre gamble looked like reaping the rewards of a second win, until on lap 29 his fuel valve detached which resulted in a fuel leak. On lap 74, with three laps left, the hydraulic pump failed on Hill's car, causing it to become stuck in third gear, giving him an intermittent throttle. As a result, Hill started losing time and was overtaken by Villeneuve part-way through the final lap. Villeneuve won the race with Hill finishing second while Herbert took third place on the podium. With Schumacher only 4th, Villeneuve closed to within 3 points in the title race with Frentzen slipping to 5th in the standings after three consecutive retirements.

The Belgian Grand Prix witnessed a pre-race heavy rain shower that engulfed Spa Francorchamps and with it flooded away Villeneuve's aspirations of winning in the Ardennes Forest. Villeneuve had taken a dominant pole position in dry conditions and having been fastest in the morning warm up, looked set to dominate the Belgian Grand Prix. However, heavy rain initiated a safety car start for the first time in Formula 1, with the opening 3 laps under a full course yellow. When the safety car came in Villeneuve led the 4th lap on his wet tyres ahead of Alesi's Benetton and the intermediate tyred Schumacher. On lap 5, Schumacher passed Villeneuve for the lead into Rivage, before opening up a 5.8 second lead which grew to 16.9 seconds by the end of the following lap. With Villeneuve having been on the wrong wet tyre, he then compounded one mistake by making two more. He would brake too late into the Bus Stop chicane and had to elect to take to the pit lane entry, by which point the team used the opportunity to switch to intermediates after a delay getting the tyres ready. However, the track was rapidly drying which saw other runners take to the slicks, an action that recalled Villeneuve back in on lap 12 to fit dries as he dropped to 16th. Meanwhile, Frentzen, who started 7th, had fallen back in the opening laps before pitting for slicks, an approach that saw him jump ahead of his teammate. Frentzen would run 4th for much of the race before taking 3rd post race after Häkkinen's disqualification. Villeneuve meanwhile rocketed up the order in dry conditions, setting the race's fastest lap by a full second before taking a damage limitation 5th after Häkkinen's exclusion. Villeneuve remained 2nd in the Drivers Championship on 55 points and Frentzen moved back up to 3rd place onto 23 points.

Qualifying for the Italian Grand Prix saw the Williams cars line up 2nd and 4th with Frentzen ahead. The power circuit, with similar characteristics to Hockenheim, did not suit the cars as well, a fact illustrated by their finishing positions of 3rd and 5th, again Frentzen ahead. With Schumacher finishing 6th, Villeneuve closed to within 10 points of the German, while Williams moved to within 1 point of Ferrari. Despite Frentzen's podium, he dropped to 4th place in the standings, 1 point behind Alesi in the Benetton. Also notable was Villeneuve's second warning of the season during Friday practice for failing to slow down adequately for yellow flags, the same offence he committed as that at the San Marino Grand Prix.

With form having been erratic between the Canadian and Italian race meetings, a late season resurgence which ultimately steered the team back on the path to title glory began at the Austrian Grand Prix. Another late showing in qualifying saw Villeneuve snatch pole position on his final run, with Frentzen lined up 4th. The pair fell back to 4th and 6th at the start, which became 3rd and 5th at the end of lap 1 when Häkkinen's Mercedes engine blew again. Villeneuve then passed Barrichello's Stewart Ford for second place before overcutting Trulli's Prost to regain the lead at just over half distance. Frentzen was running 3rd when Michael Schumacher passed him under waved yellow flags, resulting in a 10-second stop-go penalty for the championship leader, which gave Frentzen 3rd whilst Schumacher fell to 7th, passing Hill's Arrows on the final lap to take 6th. Villeneuve's victory promoted the Canadian to 67 points, one shy of Schumacher's 68 with 3 rounds to go. Frentzen moved back above Alesi into 3rd place on 31 points. Meanwhile, Williams overtook Ferrari in the Constructors championship to move onto 98 points, 12 clear of the Scuderia.

The Luxembourg Grand Prix saw Villeneuve and Williams victorious and both seemingly on the brink of capturing the World title, with Villeneuve sealing his seventh win of the campaign and Frentzen following into 3rd place whilst title rivals Ferrari failed to score a single point. The Williams cars qualified 2nd and 3rd with Villeneuve ahead, however the pair would touch in the run down to the first corner, with Villeneuve dropping to 3rd behind the two McLaren's whilst Frentzen, in the confusion, accidentally knocked his ignition switch which briefly cut out his Renault engine. As a result, Frentzen dropped back into the midfield. Both drivers were aided in their recovery drives by the two McLaren's almost simultaneously blowing up their Mercedes engines on laps 42 and 43. Villeneuve thus inherited the lead and stroked his car home to record his eleventh and final Formula 1 victory at the same venue as his first in early 1996. The result left the Canadian 9 points ahead of Schumacher with Frentzen defending a 1 point lead over season rival Alesi. Williams extended their lead to 26 points over Ferrari after the Grove teams second consecutive 1-3 finish.

A tumultuous yet victorious Japanese Grand Prix weekend provided a microcosm for the team's 1997 season, where crushing lows were still subsided by ultimate success. Villeneuve would arrive in Japan with a 9-point advantage in the championship but leave with a 1-point deficit, whilst Williams Renault needed just 6 points to clinch the Constructors championship, a result they duly delivered upon courtesy of Frentzen's 2nd place finish. For Villeneuve, the penultimate race meeting of the year turned sour from the moment he was penalised for failing to slow down for waved yellow flags as a result of Verstappen's stationary Tyrrell out of spoon curve during Saturday morning practice. It was the Canadian's third such offence during the season after San Marino and Italy, which consequently resulted in Villeneuve being excluded from the Japanese Grand Prix. The team appealed the decision and Villeneuve was duly able to continue his participation, racing under appeal from pole position. Frentzen qualified the second Williams into 6th spot. As the lights went out, Villeneuve defensively moved straight across Schumacher to keep the lead into turn 1 and then proceeded to back the pack up in the hope that other drivers could take points away from Schumacher, seeing as though any points Villeneuve scored would likely be taken away. Irvine would pass Häkkinen and Schumacher on lap 3 round the outside at turn 6 before passing Villeneuve for 1st into the final chicane on the same lap. Following Irvine's pit stop, Villeneuve would make his first stop on lap 20 from the lead, rejoining briefly in 3rd before Schumacher shot straight up the inside of the Williams into turn 1 after the Canadian's rumbustious attempts to block the German. With Frentzen pitting and rejoining 4th, Irvine regained 1st place then dramatically slowed to allow Schumacher into the lead on lap 25 at the esses, before blocking Villeneuve off. Villeneuve would make his second stop from 3rd place but remained stationary for 13.4 seconds following a refuelling rig issue, relegating him to 5th behind Frentzen and Häkkinen. With both Ferraris stopping for their last stop, Frentzen took the lead and with clear air closed the net gap to Irvine, rejoining ahead of the Irishman into turn 1 on lap 38. Frentzen would close in on Schumacher and set the fastest lap of the race to finish 1.3 seconds adrift; his 6 points tightening his grip on 3rd in the standings and confirming Williams Renault as 1997 Constructors World Champions. Villeneuve would finish 5th but lose the 2 points after the team withdrew their appeal. Consequently, he left Japan 1 crucial point behind Schumacher with one race to go.

The title showdown for 1997's season finale would take place at the European Grand Prix at Jerez in Spain. Schumacher entered the title decider on 78 points, with Villeneuve on 77. The qualifying hour would produce an unprecedented first for Formula 1, with championship rivals Villeneuve and Schumacher followed as well by Frentzen all ensuring that the top 3 set the exact same time to the nearest thousandth of a second, each lapping the Jerez circuit in 1:21.072. Crucially, Villeneuve would secure his 10th pole position of the season courtesy of recording the time first, doing so on his first run in the qualifying hour. Schumacher would match the time just over 20 minutes later, before Frentzen equaled the pair in the final 5 minutes of the session. For Villeneuve, it all paled into insignificance when the red lights went out as too much wheelspin dropped him to 3rd behind Schumacher and Frentzen after letting his teammate by into turn 1. With Schumacher slowly eking out a lead, the Williams Renaults switched positions on lap 8 with Villeneuve picking up both 2nd place and the chase to catch his title rival. Villeneuve would make the first of two stops on lap 23 from the lead, a lap after Schumacher came in, with their status quo remaining after Frentzen and the two McLaren's came in shortly after. The pair continued to race away at the front as they approached their second stops, with Villeneuve having closed a one time 5 second lead down to 2 seconds. Following their final stops on laps 42 and 43, Villeneuve rapidly closed further to move to within 0.3 seconds of Schumacher on lap 47. Approaching the Dry Sac turn 6 hairpin on lap 48, Villeneuve pulled out under braking to launch down the inside of Schumacher's Ferrari to retake the lead, the two controversially colliding after Schumacher, who initially refrained from turning right to avoid his title rival, then steered right into the Williams as the lead changed hands. The ensuing collision saw the Ferrari bounce off the side-pod of the Williams and into the gravel, beached. The knock, which left Villeneuve's battery hold damaged, meant that the battery was now only connected through its own electrical cables. Suspecting potential damage, Villeneuve would round off the final 21 laps at a reduced pace, passing the win to the McLaren of Häkkinen as he and Coulthard went by on the final lap after Villeneuve willingly moved aside. Crossing the line in 3rd place, the 4 points crowned Jacques Villeneuve the 1997 FIA Formula 1 World Champion. Heinz Harald Frentzen came home 6th after sacrificing his race to play a supporting role to Villeneuve.

Rothmans Williams Renault ultimately retained their Constructors title with 123 points. Villeneuve's winning total was confirmed with 81 points, whilst Frentzen would be promoted to 2nd place in the Drivers Championship on 42 points after Michael Schumacher was disqualified from his runner-up position as punishment for his perceived foul play against Villeneuve in the season finale at Jerez.

In total, of the season's 17 Grand Prix the Williams Renault FW19 would record 8 victories, 11 pole positions, 9 fastest laps, 15 podiums and 5 front row lockouts.

== Sponsorship and livery ==
For 1997, the blue colour on the engine cover was flipped over from its three predecessors. This was the fourth and final year for Rothmans as the team's title sponsor before a sponsorship deal with Winfield was signed for 1998, which therefore brought the curtain down on the teams iconic blue, white, red and gold livery at the seasons conclusion. Williams displayed Rothmans logos, except at the French, British and German Grands Prix due to anti-tobacco laws. Instead of continuing to censor the brand with "Racing" like in previous seasons, the logo was replaced with "Ro?" in Britain, a barcode in Germany and a question mark in France.

Throughout the year, the team gained several sponsors including Burg-Wächter, Auto Motor und Sport, ProSieben, Snap-on, Hype Energy and Pagine Gialle, all of which were showcased across the season on the FW19's bargeboards.

== Later uses ==
On 22-23 April 1998, WRC champion Tommi Mäkinen and 5-time 500cc world champion Mick Doohan test drove the FW19 in FW20 livery during the Winfield Champions Test at the Barcelona-Catalunya circuit.

== Complete Formula One results ==
(key) (results in bold indicate pole position; results in italics indicate fastest lap)

Year	Team	Engine	Tyres	Drivers	1	2	3	4	5	6	7	8	9	10	11	12	13	14	15	16	17	Points	WCC
1997	Williams	Renault V10	**G**		AUS	BRA	ARG	SMR	MON	ESP	CAN	FRA	GBR	GER	HUN	BEL	ITA	AUT	LUX	JPN	EUR	**123**	**1st**
1997	Williams	Renault V10	**G**	Jacques Villeneuve	**Ret**	**1**	**1**	**Ret**	Ret	**1**	Ret	4	**1**	Ret	1	**5**	5	**1**	1	**DSQ**	**3**	**123**	**1st**
1997	Williams	Renault V10	**G**	Heinz-Harald Frentzen	8	9	Ret	1	**Ret**	8	4	2	Ret	Ret	Ret	3	3	3	3	2	6	**123**	**1st**

== Sponsors ==
Brand	Country	Placed on
Rothmans	United Kingdom	Rear wing, fin, sidepods, front wing
Renault	France	Sides, nose, fin
Komatsu	Japan	Side
Mirage	Italy	Sidepods
Sonax	Germany	Front wing end plate
Castrol	United Kingdom	Rear wing end plate, mirrors, nose
Falke	Germany	Front wing
Auto Motor und Sport	Germany	Nose, barge board

Awards
Preceded by Williams FW18	Autosport; Racing Car Of The Year; 1997	Succeeded by McLaren MP4/13
