= Heinz-Harald Frentzen =

German racing driver (born 1967)

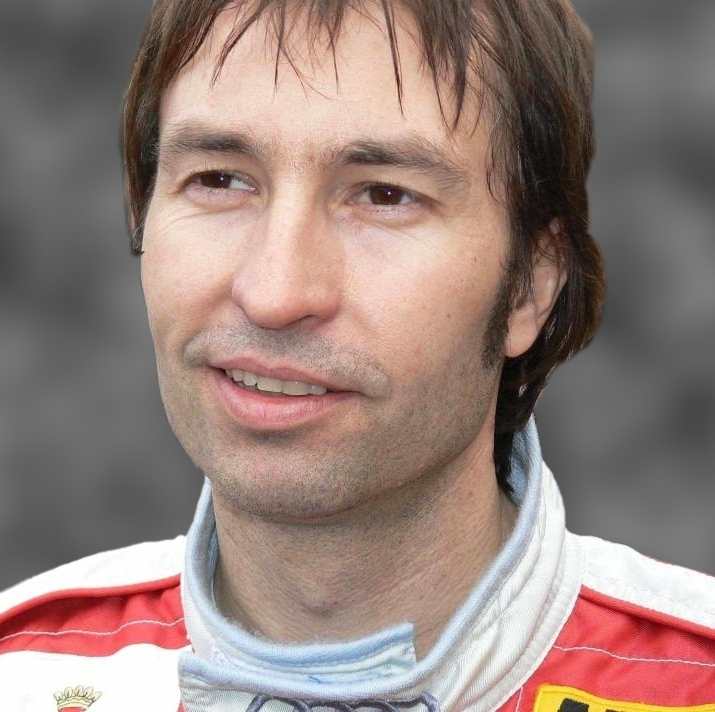
- Frentzen in 2006
- Born: 18 May 1967 (age 59); Mönchengladbach, West Germany
- Spouse: Tanja Nigge (m. 1999)
- Children: 3

Formula One World Championship career
- Nationality: (Germany) German
- Active years: 1994–2003
- Team(s): Sauber, Williams, Jordan, Prost, Arrows
- Entries: 160 (156 starts)
- Championships: 0
- Wins: 3
- Podiums: 18
- Career points: 174
- Pole positions: 2
- Fastest laps: 6
- First entry: 1994 Brazilian Grand Prix
- First win: 1997 San Marino Grand Prix
- Last win: 1999 Italian Grand Prix
- Last entry: 2003 Japanese Grand Prix

24 Hours of Le Mans career
- Years: 1992, 2008
- Teams: Lola, Aston Martin
- Best finish: 13th (1992)
- Class wins: 0

Heinz-Harald Frentzen (German: [ˈhaɪnts ˈhaːʁalt ˈfʁɛntsn̩]; born 18 May 1967) is a German former racing driver who competed in Formula One from 1994 to 2003. Frentzen was runner-up in the Formula One World Drivers' Championship in 1997 with Williams, and won three Grands Prix across 10 seasons.

Born in Mönchengladbach, Frentzen began his racing career aged 12 in karting, winning several titles including the junior German Championship. He progressed to junior formulae in 1985, winning several races in Formula Ford before finishing runner-up in the 1989 German Formula Three Championship amidst a title battle with Karl Wendlinger and Michael Schumacher. After three seasons of racing in Japan, Frentzen signed with Sauber in 1994, making his Formula One debut at the Brazilian Grand Prix. He remained at Sauber—now under Red Bull sponsorship—the following season, achieving his maiden podium at the Italian Grand Prix.

After scoring several point finishes in his 1996 campaign, Frentzen joined Williams to replace reigning World Champion Damon Hill alongside Jacques Villeneuve. Frentzen achieved his maiden victory at the San Marino Grand Prix, taking several podiums as he finished runner-up to Villeneuve after Schumacher's collision with Villeneuve at the last race of the season saw his disqualification from the standings. (Note: Michael Schumacher was excluded from the results of the 1997 World Drivers' Championship, promoting Frentzen to second behind teammate Jacques Villeneuve.) Williams suffered their first winless season since 1988 with the FW20, prompting his departure to Jordan in a swap with Ralf Schumacher. Frentzen achieved further wins at the French and Italian Grands Prix in 1999, finishing third in the World Drivers' Championship to Mika Häkkinen and Eddie Irvine. After struggling for form in 2000, Frentzen was dropped by Jordan after the 2001 British Grand Prix, swapping with Jean Alesi to join Prost. After Prost went bankrupt at the end of the 2001 season, Frentzen spent two seasons with Arrows and Sauber before retiring at the conclusion of 2003, having achieved three wins, two pole positions, six fastest laps and 18 podiums in Formula One.

Outside of Formula One, Frentzen competed full-time in the Deutsche Tourenwagen Masters from 2004 to 2006, as well as competing in the all-star Speedcar Series in both of its seasons. Frentzen entered two editions of the 24 Hours of Le Mans in 1992 and 2008, finishing fourth in class at the latter with Aston Martin.

== Early career ==
Frentzen was born on 18 May 1967 in the West German city of Mönchengladbach (North Rhine-Westphalia) to Heinrich-Harald Frentzen (1933–2012), a German entrepreneur and his Spanish wife Angela Lladosa (1937–2020). He has two sisters (Sylvia, a theologian, and Sonja, a teacher) and two half-sisters (Samantha, a former student, and Nicole-Nadine). His family was connected to motorsport; his father raced between 1950 and 1957. Frentzen's parents divorced when he was eight years old and his father subsequently married Mexican-born Arazelli while Angela returned to Spain.

Frentzen began karting at the age of twelve, after his father bought him his first kart, and made an extraordinarily successful start. In 1981, aged fourteen, Frentzen won the German Junior Kart Championship. Two years later, Frentzen entered the CIK Asia Pacific Championships in Australia driving a Dino although he did not finish. In 1984, he finished runner-up in the 100cc class. He was funded and supported by his father—a funeral director—who also acted as both team boss and head mechanic.

In 1985, Frentzen moved into car racing by entering the German Formula Ford 2000 series. After two seasons in Formula Ford, he was runner-up in the 1987 series, despite not participating in all races. Frentzen progressed to German Formula Opel Lotus in 1988 in the Junior Team of former Formula One driver Jochen Mass, who had been impressed by Frentzen's performances in Formula Ford. Frentzen was champion of the German series in his first year and his teammate Marco Werner finished third in the championship. He also participated in the Formula Opel Lotus Euroseries, where he finished sixth in the championship, scoring 56 points.

The next step was the German Formula 3 Championship in 1989, where Frentzen competed against many future stars including Michael Schumacher and Karl Wendlinger. At the time, there was a big push by Bernie Ecclestone to have a German driver in the Formula One World Championship, so the ONS (the German National Motorsports committee) decided to support both Frentzen and Schumacher. The ONS put up the reward of a Formula One test to the driver who first would take a victory in a Formula 3 race. This ultimately ended up being Schumacher, in a controversial race at Zeltweg, Austria in which Frentzen claimed Schumacher had forced him off the track; however, Schumacher did not get the Formula One test drive anyway. Karl Wendlinger won the German Formula 3 Championship and Frentzen became joint runner-up with Schumacher (the two finishing on identical points totals).

In 1990, Frentzen entered the International Formula 3000 series driving for Eddie Jordan Racing and was partnered by Eddie Irvine. Frentzen finished the season 16th in the championship, scoring three points. In the same year, he also participated in the World Sports Prototype Championship driving a Mercedes-Benz C11 scoring one podium and six points. In 1991, Frentzen continued to drive in International Formula 3000, moving to Vortex Motorsport and scored five points in that year's series.

== Formula One ==
=== Sauber (1994–1996) ===
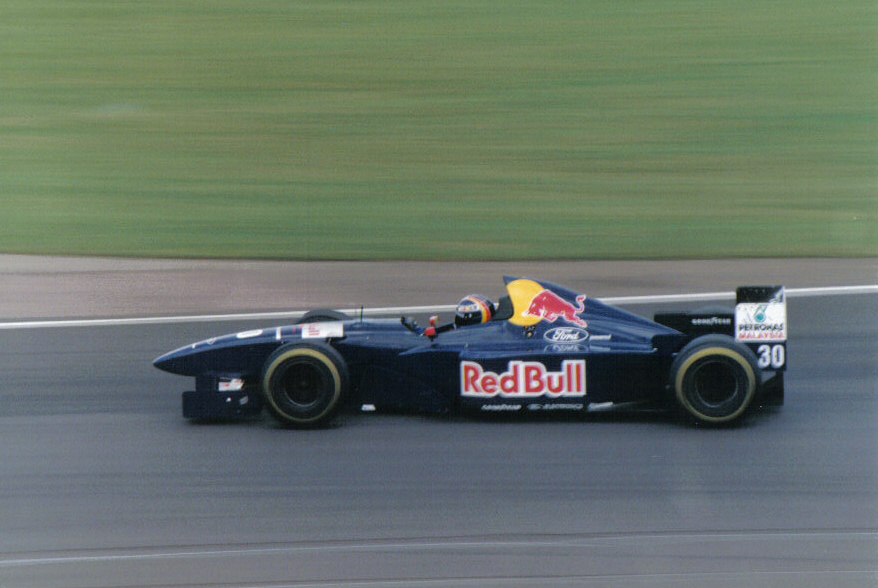
Frentzen driving for Sauber at the 1995 British Grand Prix

In 1994, Frentzen was given a Formula One drive by Peter Sauber in a Mercedes powered car, as teammate to fellow Mercedes junior Wendlinger, who had made it to F1 in 1991 and was in his second year with the team. Frentzen began the year strongly, qualifying fifth for his début in Brazil (albeit spinning off in the race) and scoring his first points with fifth in the Pacific Grand Prix. He was then thrust into the role of de facto team leader after Wendlinger crashed during qualifying for the fourth round of the season in Monaco, leaving him with severe head injuries that ruled him out for the remainder of the year. Frentzen had the measure of substitute team-mates Andrea de Cesaris and JJ Lehto, scoring points on three further occasions and finishing thirteenth in the World Drivers' Championship. A particularly noteworthy performance came in the European Grand Prix at Jerez, where he qualified fifth and ran third in the race. The team's decision to run a one-stop refuelling strategy caused his pace to suffer and he slipped back to sixth by the finish.

Sauber's performance was not sufficient to keep the partnership with Mercedes alive: the marque moved to McLaren, leaving the team to acquire a supply of Ford V8 engines for the 1995 season instead. The engines had powered Michael Schumacher to the World Drivers' Championship in 1994, but were now completely outpowered by the V10 and V12 engines used by the leading teams. The Sauber C14 chassis was also uncompetitive at the start of the year, but Frentzen produced consistent performances to finish in the points on multiple occasions. The performance of the car improved with development throughout the year, culminating in Frentzen taking the team's first podium finish at the Italian Grand Prix and qualifying a season's-best fifth in Portugal. He also easily had the measure of his team-mates: first, the returning Wendlinger, who was then replaced by Williams test driver Jean-Christophe Boullion mid-season. Frentzen's performance against the latter was particularly significant in the team ultimately signing him to drive for the 1997 season. He finished ninth in the World Drivers' Championship with 15 points.

In 1996, Frentzen was joined by Johnny Herbert and Ford upgraded to a V10 engine configuration, promising more power. The unit was still lacking in performance compared to the top teams, and was also less reliable than the trusty V8 had been the previous season. Frentzen was therefore limited to just three points-scoring finishes—in Monaco, Spain and Japan—whilst Herbert was also closer to him in performance than his team-mates in previous years had been. He finished the season twelfth in the World Drivers' Championship with seven points; by this stage, his move to Williams for 1997 had been announced.

=== Williams (1997–1998) ===
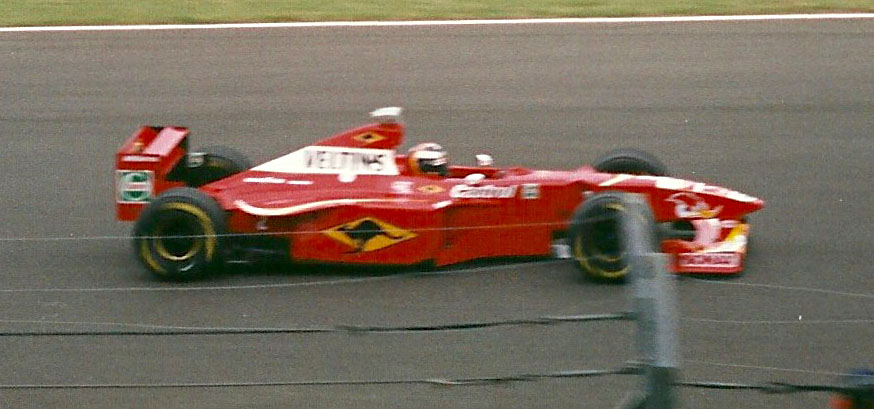
Frentzen at the 1998 British Grand Prix

For the 1997 season, Frentzen replaced 1996 champion Damon Hill at the Williams-Renault team. At the first race of the season, Frentzen took the lead at the first corner and remained there until his first pit stop. He was running second late in the race when a brake disc exploded, throwing him off the circuit and into retirement. He took his first win at the fourth race of the year at San Marino. Frentzen followed this with his first pole position of his career at the following round in Monaco, but did not finish the race. After inconsistency marked the first half of the season, Frentzen finished the second half of season with six points scoring performances including five consecutive podiums. Despite eight front-row starts and seven podium finishes, Frentzen was generally out-performed by team-mate Jacques Villeneuve, out-qualifying the French-Canadian only four times during the season. Frentzen was unable to secure another victory and finished third in the driver's championship standings with 42 points to teammate Villeneuve's 81. He would be elevated to second after the disqualification of Michael Schumacher.

Renault discontinued factory support for the Williams engines in 1998. Williams also lost chief designer Adrian Newey to McLaren during the off-season. Consequently the team suffered a loss of performance compared to eventual title winners McLaren and Williams' 1997 title-rivals Ferrari. Frentzen would start the season with a podium at Albert Park. This would be the highlight of Frentzen's year, as he was unable to repeat the podium, and was once again out-performed by team mate Jacques Villenuve. Frentzen finished the season placed seventh in the championship with 17 points. Frentzen would depart Williams during the off-season after two difficult years, with the time considered disappointing due to difficulty adjusting to the different atmosphere at Williams compared to Sauber and disagreements with head engineer Patrick Head.

=== Jordan (1999–mid 2001) and Prost (mid 2001) ===
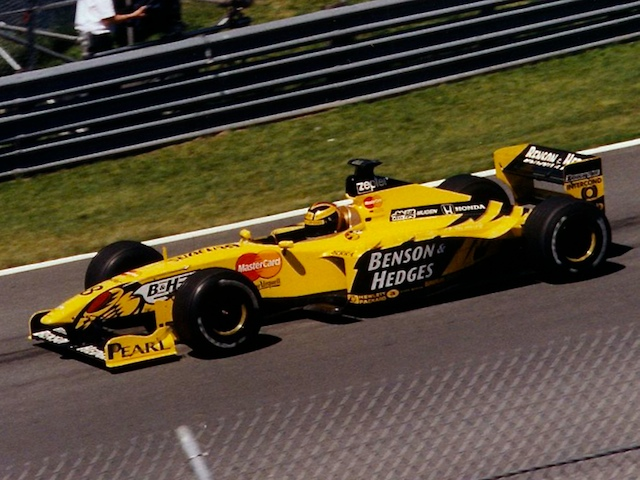
Frentzen driving for Jordan at the 1999 Canadian Grand Prix, during his most successful season in F1

In 1999 Frentzen moved to Jordan in a straight swap with Ralf Schumacher and enjoyed success in the Mugen-Honda powered car, with two race wins and scoring points in the majority of races. During the 1999 European Grand Prix, he was leading after a pole position and with both Häkkinen and Irvine outside of the points (Häkkinen because he pitted for wets during a very very short shower period and Irvine because of a very slow pit stop where the rear right tyre was not ready in time) and with both outside the points and equal on 60 points and with him on 50, if positions would not change, he would be equal on points with both Häkkinen and Irvine with two races to go. But on the 32nd lap, his Jordan stopped. Häkkinen went on to recover and finish fifth. Before the 1999 Malaysian Grand Prix he was 12 points behind championship leader Häkkinen. But his title dreams were dashed on that race, with Frentzen finishing sixth, with Häkkinen and Irvine finishing third and first respectively. With one race to go (and ten points still available for drivers), Frentzen had 51 points, 19 less than championship leader Irvine. Frentzen finished third in the Driver Championship (22 points behind the world champion Mika Häkkinen) and was regarded by many as the driver of the year. After the strong season Frentzen was considered as a favourite to challenge for the championship in 2000.

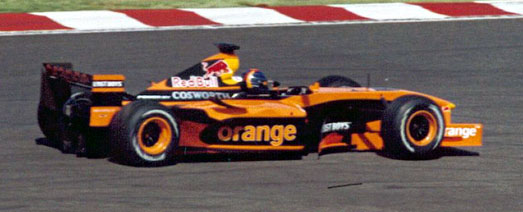
Frentzen driving for Arrows at the 2002 French Grand Prix

2000 and 2001 were critical years as Honda also began to supply the BAR team, resulting in a race between the teams as to who would secure the regular engine supply. In 2000, Frentzen managed two podiums, which were the best results for the team, but Jordan still finished down the grid and, crucially, behind BAR. After some low points finishes, injury, disagreements about the technical direction of the team (Frentzen reportedly offered to pay for the changes to fix the car, out of his own pocket) and then a string of retirements halfway through the 2001 season, Jordan sacked Frentzen and replaced him with Jean Alesi. Eight years later Eddie Jordan revealed that the termination of Frentzen's contract was a move to appease Honda and sign the Japanese driver Takuma Sato to race for the team. Frentzen subsequently took Alesi's place at the struggling Prost team, and managed to qualify fourth at Spa, before the outfit collapsed financially at the end of the season.

=== Arrows (2002) and return to Sauber (2002–03) ===
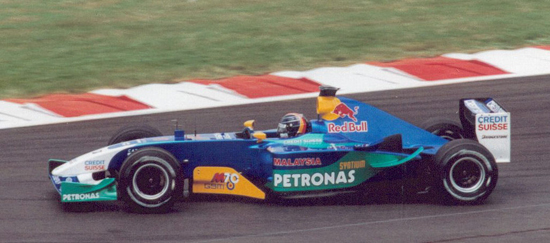
Frentzen driving for Sauber at the 2003 French Grand Prix

On 30 December 2001, Frentzen was signed by Arrows for the 2002 season. He scored points on two occasions and outpaced both the Jaguars who ran the same engine. The team went bankrupt in August and Frentzen was released from his contract. Back with Sauber for 2003, after a one-off drive replacing Felipe Massa at the 2002 United States Grand Prix, Frentzen was evenly matched with his highly rated teammate Nick Heidfeld and scored a final podium finish in the penultimate race of the year in the United States.

== DTM ==
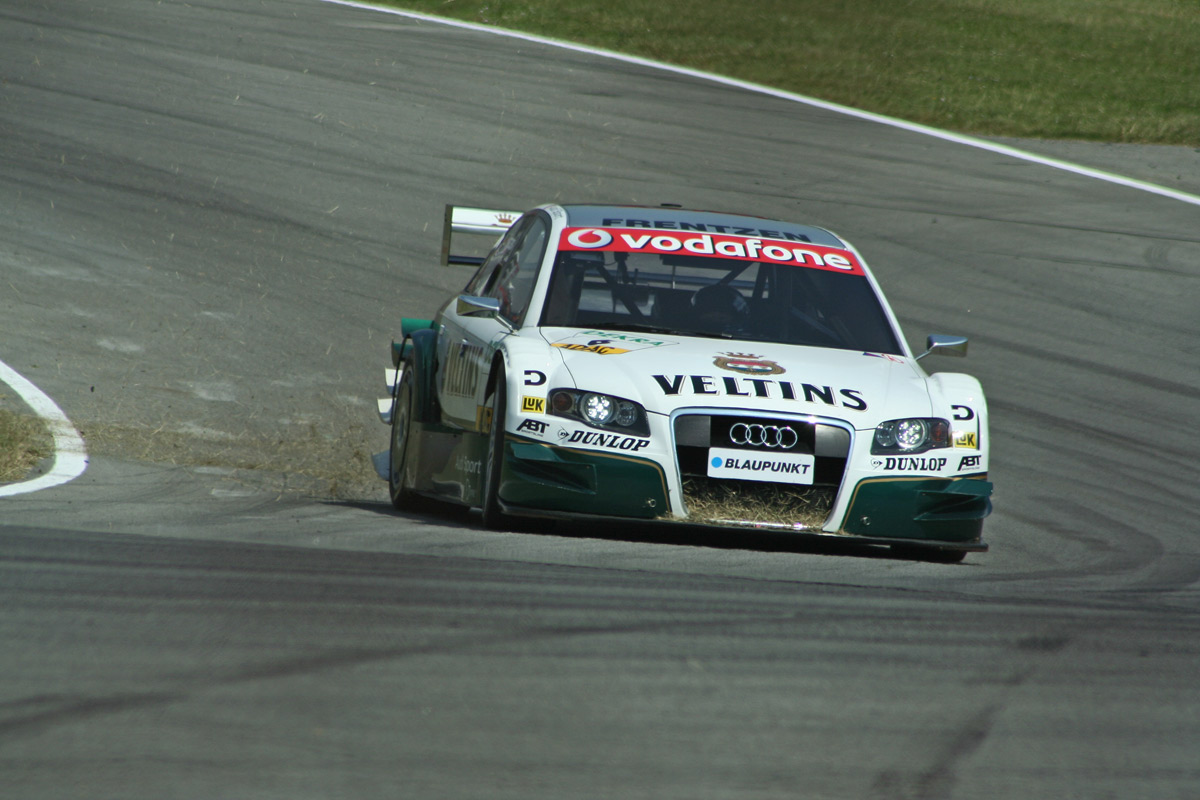
Frentzen driving for Audi (Abt) in the 2006 DTM season

For 2004, Frentzen moved to the German Deutsche Tourenwagen Masters saloon car series to drive for Opel, encouraged by the success achieved in the series by fellow F1 refugee Jean Alesi. His Opel Vectra was not a competitive car, and he was regularly outpaced by not only the Audi and Mercedes drivers but also by his Opel teammates, eventually finishing the season 14th in the championship standings. He remained in the DTM with Opel for the 2005 season and finished the year in eighth as best-placed Opel driver, with his best result a third place from pole position at Brno in the Czech Republic.

After Opel withdrew after the 2005 season, Frentzen joined Audi for 2006. He would finish third at the first race of the season at Hockenheim and again at the eighth race of the season at Barcelona. Frentzen finished the season seventh in the final standings and quit the team stating he had "no support from the team".

== Later career ==
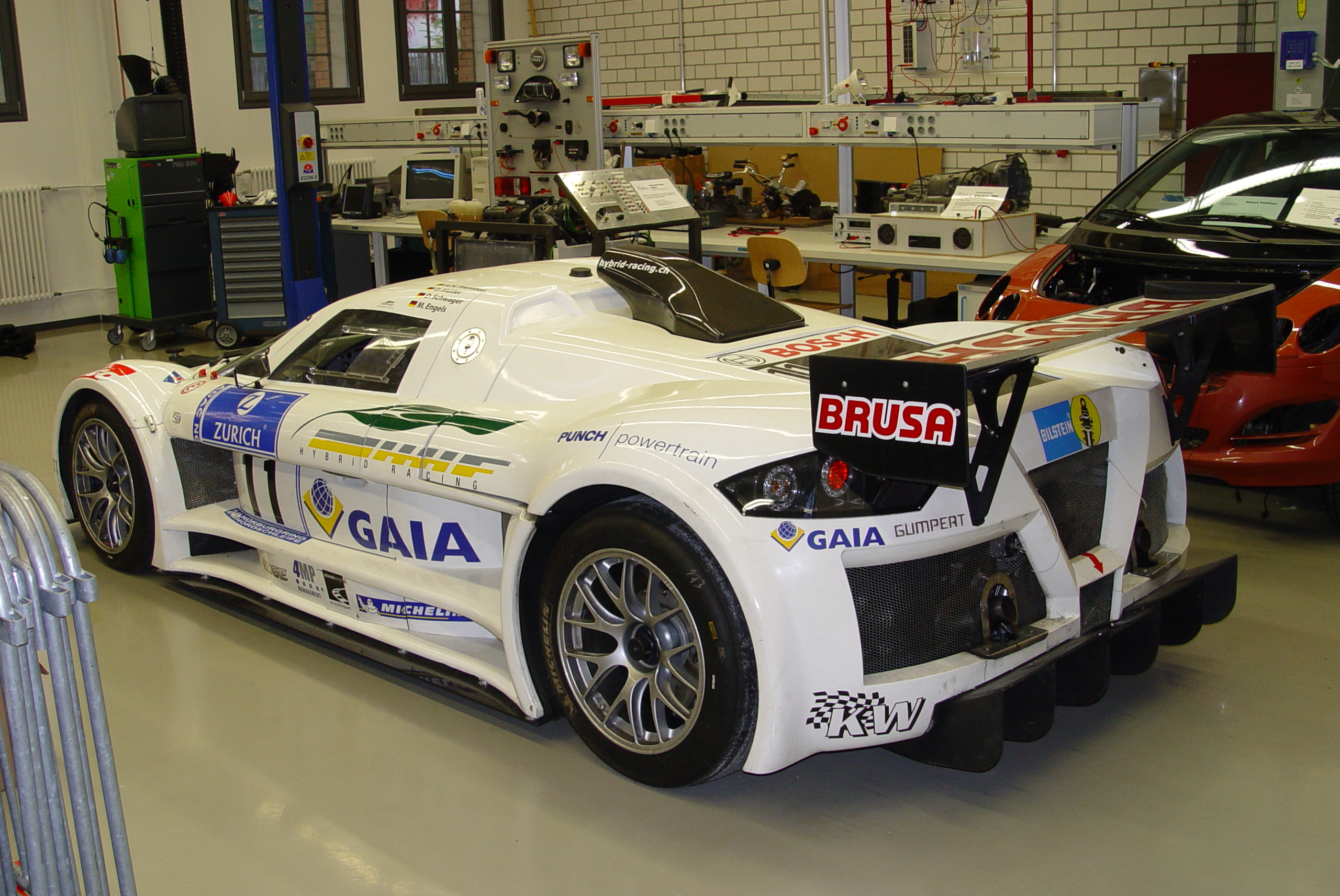
HHF Hybrid Concept Car (Gumpert Apollo)

In April 2008, Frentzen drove the Bahrain race in the Speedcar Series of the 2007/2008 season and later on joined the Speedcar Series for the complete 2008/2009 season. He competed in the 24 Hours of Le Mans for Aston Martin Racing driving one of the two factory Aston Martin DBR9s with Karl Wendlinger and Andrea Piccini in the GT1 class. His team finished fourth in class and 16th overall.

Also in 2008, Frentzen built the HHF Hybrid Concept Car which he entered in the 24 Hours Nürburgring with his own team. The chassis was a bought Gumpert Apollo road car with a 3.3 litre V8 bi-turbo with 520 hp and an electric motor with approximately 136 hp. Frentzen finished the race but was not classified due to two conventional gearbox failures.

In 2011, Frentzen won a special one-off "ROC Legends" race against Hans-Joachim Stuck, Marc Duez and Stig Blomqvist as part of the 2011 Race of Champions. In 2012, Frentzen competed in the ADAC GT Masters season with a Callaway Competition Corvette Z06, and returned to the series in 2014 with a HTP Motorsport Mercedes-Benz SLS AMG GT3.

== Driving style and appraisal ==
Frentzen has been described as a loyal driver. The monthly magazine F1 Racing observed that the key issue for Frentzen was finding the appropriate settings for his car which was done by himself. In his autobiography An Independent Man, Eddie Jordan said that Frentzen did a "great job" at driving the Jordan 199. After leaving Sauber at the end of 2003, BBC Sport described Frentzen as a driver who "never quite made the most of a brilliant natural talent". Sauber team principal Peter Sauber said in 2005 that Frentzen was the most important driver for his team but admitted that the driver needed to work in a specific atmosphere and referred to his time at Williams where he was in conflict with technical director Patrick Head.

== Other notable appearances ==
Frentzen appeared on an episode in the 29th series of British motoring show Top Gear in 2020, in which he appeared as a rival for the presenters in a Germany versus Britain challenge.

== Personal life ==
In the early 1990s, Frentzen was in a relationship with Corinna Betsch. After their relationship ended, Corinna later married fellow Formula 1 driver Michael Schumacher. In 1999, Frentzen married Tanja Nigge. Together they have three children.

== Racing record ==
=== Career summary ===
Season	Series	Team	Races	Wins	Poles	F/Laps	Podiums	Points	Position
1985	German Formula Ford 2000							153	9th
1986	German Formula Ford 2000	Eifelland Racing-Albert Hamper						49	5th
1986	European Formula Ford 2000							0	NC
1987	German Formula Ford 2000	Eifelland Racing-Albert Hamper	12	2	4	2	7	338	**2nd**
1987	European Formula Ford 2000							0	NC
1988	Formula Opel Lotus Germany	Jochen Mass Junior Team	14	7	9	0	8	128	**1st**
1988	EFDA Formula GM Lotus Euroseries	Jochen Mass Junior Team	3	2	2	1	3	56	6th
1989	German Formula Three	Team JSK Baumanagement	12	3	3	1	6	163	**2nd**
1989	Macau Grand Prix	Watsons Water Team Schübel	1	0	0	0	0	N/A	DNF
1989	British Formula Three	Watson's Hong Kong Team	1	0	0	0	0	0	DNF
1990	International Formula 3000	Eddie Jordan Racing	10	0	0	0	0	3	18th
1990	Macau Grand Prix	Camel Alan Docking Racing	1	0	0	0	0	N/A	DNF
1990	World Sportscar Championship	Team Sauber Mercedes	1	0	0	0	1	6	17th
1991	International Formula 3000	Vortex Motorsport	9	0	0	0	0	5	14th
1992	Japanese Formula 3000	Team Nova	3	0	0	0	1	5	14th
1992	World Sportscar Championship	Euro Racing	2	0	0	0	0	16	15th
1992	Porsche Carrera Cup	Porsche AG	2	0	0	0	0	0	NC
1992	All Japan Sports-Prototype Championship	From A Racing	1	0	0	0	1	15	20th
1993	Japanese Formula 3000	Team Nova	9	0	1	2	1	8	9th
1993	All Japan Sports-Prototype Championship	From A Racing	1	0	0	0	1	?	NC
1994	Formula One	Broker Sauber Mercedes	4	0	0	0	0	7	13th
1994	Formula One	Sauber Mercedes	11	0	0	0	0	7	13th
1995	Formula One	Red Bull Sauber Ford	17	0	0	0	1	15	9th
1996	Formula One	Red Bull Sauber Ford	16	0	0	0	0	7	12th
1997	Formula One	Rothmans Williams Renault	17	1	1	6	7	42	**2nd**
1998	Formula One	Winfield Williams	16	0	0	0	1	17	7th
1999	Formula One	B&H Jordan	16	2	1	0	6	54	**3rd**
2000	Formula One	B&H Jordan	17	0	0	0	2	11	9th
2001	Formula One	B&H Jordan Honda	10	0	0	0	0	6	13th
2001	Formula One	Prost Acer	5	0	0	0	0	6	13th
2002	Formula One	Orange Arrows	11	0	0	0	0	2	18th
2002	Formula One	Sauber Petronas	1	0	0	0	0	2	18th
2003	Formula One	Sauber Petronas	15	0	0	0	1	13	11th
2004	Deutsche Tourenwagen Masters	OPC Team Holzer	11	0	0	0	0	3	14th
2005	Deutsche Tourenwagen Masters	OPC Team Holzer	11	0	0	0	2	17	8th
2006	Deutsche Tourenwagen Masters	Abt Sportsline	10	0	1	0	2	24	7th
2008	Speedcar Series	Phoenix Racing	2	0	0	0	0	0	18th
2008	24 Hours of Le Mans - GT1	Aston Martin Racing	1	0	0	0	0	N/A	4th
2008	24 Hours of Nürburgring - E1 XP		1	0	0	1	0	N/A	?
2008-09	Speedcar Series	Phoenix Racing	1	0	0	1	1	44	4th
2008-09	Speedcar Series	Team Lavaggi	6	0	1	2	2	44	4th
2008-09	Speedcar Series	Continental Circus	2	0	0	0	1	44	4th
2011	ADAC GT Masters	Callaway Competition	16	0	0	1	0	16	30th
2012	ADAC GT Masters	Callaway Competition	15	0	0	0	0	48	17th
2014	ADAC GT Masters	HTP Motorsport	8	0	0	0	0	6	36th

=== Complete German Formula Three results ===
(key) (Races in bold indicate pole position) (Races in italics indicate fastest lap)

Year	Entrant	Engine	1	2	3	4	5	6	7	8	9	10	11	12	DC	Pts
1989	Team JSK Baumanagement	Volkswagen	HOC; 11	NÜR; 6	AVU; 5	BRN; 9	ZEL; 2	HOC; 1	WUN; 1	**HOC**; 2	**DIE**; 1	NÜR; 7	NÜR; Ret	**HOC**; 2	**2nd**	**163**

=== Complete International Formula 3000 results ===
(key) (Races in bold indicate pole position) (Races in italics indicate fastest lap)

Year	Entrant	Chassis	Engine	1	2	3	4	5	6	7	8	9	10	11	DC	Points
1990	Eddie Jordan Racing	Reynard 90D	Mugen	DON; Ret	SIL; Ret	PAU; Ret	JER; 17	MNZ; Ret	PER; 5	HOC; 6	BRH; 7	BIR; Ret	BUG; Ret	NOG; DNQ	18th	3
1991	Vortex Motorsport	Lola T91/50	Mugen	VAL; Ret	PAU; Ret	JER; 12	MUG; 6	PER; 5	HOC; DNQ	BRH; 12	SPA; 5	BUG; Ret	NOG; Ret		14th	5

=== Complete Japanese Formula 3000 results ===
(key) (Races in bold indicate pole position) (Races in italics indicate fastest lap)

Year	Entrant	Chassis	Engine	1	2	3	4	5	6	7	8	9	10	11	DC	Points
1992	Team Nova	Lola T92/50	Mugen	SUZ	FUJ	MIN	SUZ	AUT	SUG	FUJ	FUJ	SUZ; 6	FUJ; 7	SUZ; 3	14th	5
1993	Team Nova	Lola T93/50	Mugen	SUZ; Ret	FUJ; Ret	MIN; Ret	SUZ; 8	SUG; 14	**FUJ**; 2	SUZ; 10	FUJ; 12	SUZ; 5			9th	8

=== Complete Formula One results ===
(key) (races in bold indicate pole position; races in italics indicate fastest lap)

Year	Entrant	Chassis	Engine	1	2	3	4	5	6	7	8	9	10	11	12	13	14	15	16	17	WDC	Pts
1994	Broker Sauber Mercedes	Sauber C13	Mercedes 2175B 3.5 V10	BRA; Ret	PAC; 5	SMR; 7	MON; WD	ESP; Ret	CAN; Ret												13th	7
1994	Sauber Mercedes	Sauber C13	Mercedes 2175B 3.5 V10							FRA; 4	GBR; 7	GER; Ret	HUN; Ret	BEL; Ret	ITA; Ret	POR; Ret	EUR; 6	JPN; 6	AUS; 7		13th	7
1995	Red Bull Sauber Ford	Sauber C14	Ford ECA Zetec-R 3.0 V8	BRA; Ret	ARG; 5	SMR; 6	ESP; 8	MON; 6	CAN; Ret	FRA; 10	GBR; 6	GER; Ret	HUN; 5	BEL; 4	ITA; 3	POR; 6	EUR; Ret	PAC; 7	JPN; 8	AUS; Ret	9th	15
1996	Red Bull Sauber Ford	Sauber C15	Ford JD Zetec-R 3.0 V10	AUS; 8	BRA; Ret	ARG; Ret	EUR; Ret	SMR; Ret	MON; 4^{†}	ESP; 4	CAN; Ret	FRA; Ret	GBR; 8	GER; 8	HUN; Ret	BEL; Ret	ITA; Ret	POR; 7	JPN; 6		12th	7
1997	Rothmans Williams Renault	Williams FW19	Renault RS9 3.0 V10	AUS; 8^{†}	BRA; 9	ARG; Ret	SMR; 1	**MON**; Ret	ESP; 8	CAN; 4	FRA; 2	GBR; Ret	GER; Ret	HUN; Ret	BEL; 3	ITA; 3	AUT; 3	LUX; 3	JPN; 2	EUR; 6	**2nd**	**42**
1998	Winfield Williams	Williams FW20	Mecachrome GC37-01 V10	AUS; 3	BRA; 5	ARG; 9	SMR; 5	ESP; 8	MON; Ret	CAN; Ret	FRA; 15^{†}	GBR; Ret	AUT; Ret	GER; 9	HUN; 5	BEL; 4	ITA; 7	LUX; 5	JPN; 5		7th	17
1999	Benson & Hedges Jordan	Jordan 199	Mugen Honda MF-301 HD 3.0 V10	AUS; 2	BRA; 3^{†}	SMR; Ret	MON; 4	ESP; Ret	CAN; 11^{†}	FRA; 1	GBR; 4	AUT; 4	GER; 3	HUN; 4	BEL; 3	ITA; 1	**EUR**; Ret	MAL; 6	JPN; 4		**3rd**	**54**
2000	Benson & Hedges Jordan	Jordan EJ10	Mugen Honda MF-301 HD 3.0 V10	AUS; Ret	BRA; 3	SMR; Ret	GBR; 17^{†}	ESP; 6	EUR; Ret	MON; 10^{†}	CAN; Ret	FRA; 7	AUT; Ret								9th	11
2000	Benson & Hedges Jordan	Jordan EJ10B	Mugen Honda MF-301 HE 3.0 V10											GER; Ret	HUN; 6	BEL; 6	ITA; Ret	USA; 3	JPN; Ret	MAL; Ret	9th	11
2001	Benson & Hedges Jordan Honda	Jordan EJ11	Honda RA001E 3.0 V10	AUS; 5	MAL; 4	BRA; 11^{†}	SMR; 6	ESP; Ret	AUT; Ret	MON; Ret	CAN; PO	EUR; Ret	FRA; 8	GBR; 7	GER						13th	6
2001	Prost Acer	Prost AP04	Acer 01A 3.0 V10													HUN; Ret	BEL; 9	ITA; Ret	USA; 10	JPN; 12	13th	6
2002	Orange Arrows	Arrows A23	Cosworth CR-3 3.0 V10	AUS; DSQ	MAL; 11	BRA; Ret	SMR; Ret	ESP; 6	AUT; 11	MON; 6	CAN; 13	EUR; 13	GBR; Ret	FRA; DNQ	GER; Ret	HUN	BEL	ITA			18th	2
2002	Red Bull Sauber Petronas	Sauber C21	Petronas 02A 3.0 V10																USA; 13	JPN	18th	2
2003	Red Bull Sauber Petronas	Sauber C22	Petronas 03A 3.0 V10	AUS; 6	MAL; 9	BRA; 5	SMR; 11	ESP; Ret	AUT; DNS	MON; Ret	CAN; Ret	EUR; 9	FRA; 12	GBR; 12	GER; Ret	HUN; Ret	ITA; 13^{†}	USA; 3	JPN; Ret		11th	13

^{†} Did not finish, but was classified as he had completed more than 90% of the race distance.

=== Complete Deutsche Tourenwagen Meisterschaft/Masters results ===
(key) (Races in bold indicate pole position) (Races in italics indicate fastest lap)

Year	Team	Car	1	2	3	4	5	6	7	8	9	10	11	12	13	14	15	16	17	18	19	20	21	22	Pos.	Pts
1993	DTM Junior Team	Mercedes 190E 2.5-16 Evo II	ZOL; 1	ZOL; 2	HOC; 1	HOC; 2	NÜR; 1	NÜR; 2	WUN; 1	WUN; 2	NÜR; 1	NÜR; 2	NOR; 1	NOR; 2	DON; 1	DON; 2	DIE; 1	DIE; 2	ALE; 1	ALE; 2	AVU; 1	AVU; 2	HOC; 1 DNS	HOC; 2 DNS	NC	0
2004	OPC Team Holzer	Opel Vectra GTS V8 2004	HOC; 11	EST; 12	ADR; 12	LAU; Ret	NOR; Ret	SHA; 7‡	NÜR; Ret	OSC; 14	ZAN; Ret	BRN; 6	HOC; 12												14th	3
2005	OPC Team Holzer	Opel Vectra GTS V8 2005	HOC; Ret	LAU; 14	SPA; 15	BRN; 3	OSC; 14	NOR; 6	NÜR; 12	ZAN; 3	LAU; 7	IST; Ret	HOC; 18												8th	17
2006	Abt Sportsline	Audi A4 DTM 2006	HOC; 3	LAU; 13	OSC; 4	BRH; 17	NOR; 11	NÜR; 6	ZAN; 5	CAT; 3	BUG; 10	**HOC**; 14													7th	24

^{‡} A non-championship one-off race was held in 2004 at the streets of Shanghai, China.

=== Complete 24 Hours of Le Mans results ===
Year	Team	Co-Drivers	Car	Class	Laps	Pos.	Class Pos.
1992	(Netherlands) Euro Racing	(Netherlands) Charles Zwolsman, Sr. (Japan) Shunji Kasuya	Lola T92/10-Judd	C1	271	13th	6th
2008	(United Kingdom) Aston Martin Racing	(Italy) Andrea Piccini (Austria) Karl Wendlinger	Aston Martin DBR9	GT1	339	16th	4th

== See also ==
- Formula One drivers from Germany
