= Williams FW20 =

Formula One racing car

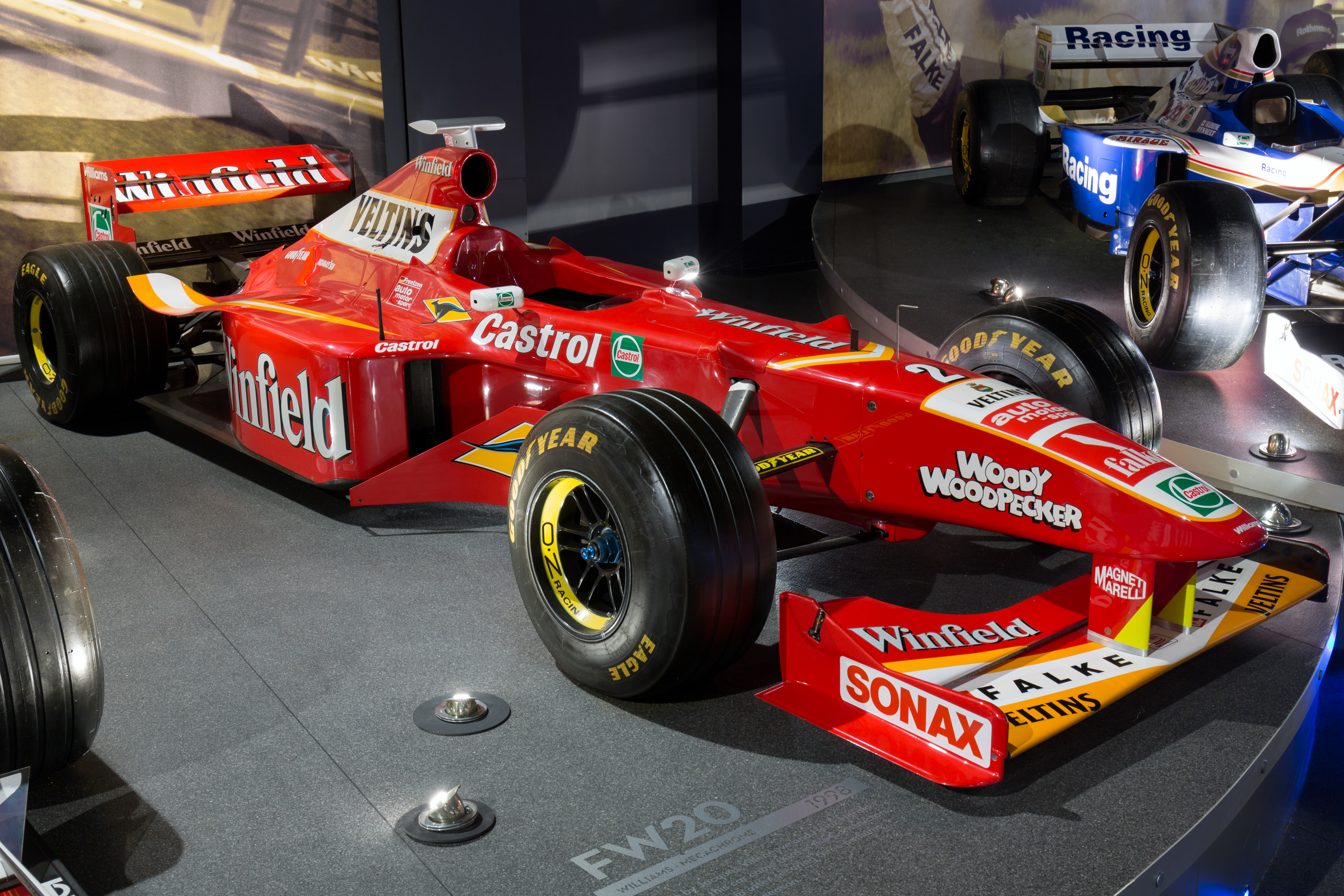
- The FW20 of Heinz-Harald Frentzen on display at Williams Conference Centre
- Category: Formula One
- Constructor: Williams
- Designers: Patrick Head (Technical Director); Gavin Fisher (Chief Designer); Brian O'Roake (Chief Composites Engineer); Mark Tatham (Chief Mechanical Engineer); Geoff Willis (Head of Aerodynamics); Jason Somerville (Senior Aerodynamicist)
- Predecessor: Williams FW19
- Successor: Williams FW21

Technical specifications
- Chassis: Carbon-fibre monocoque
- Suspension (front): Williams torsion bar/double wishbone, pushrod
- Suspension (rear): Williams coil-spring/double wishbone, pushrod
- Engine: Renault (branded as Mecachrome) GC37/01 V10 (71°) naturally aspirated mid-engine
- Transmission: Williams 6-speed longitudinal semi-automatic sequential
- Power: 775 hp (578 kW) @ 15,600 rpm
- Fuel: Castrol
- Lubricants: Castrol
- Tyres: Goodyear

Competition history
- Notable entrants: Winfield Williams
- Notable drivers: 1. (Canada) Jacques Villeneuve; 2. (Germany) Heinz-Harald Frentzen
- Debut: 1998 Australian Grand Prix
- Last event: 1998 Japanese Grand Prix
Races	Wins	Podiums	Poles	F/Laps
16	0	3	0	0
- Constructors' Championships: 0
- Drivers' Championships: 0

The Williams FW20 was the car with which the Williams Formula One team competed in the 1998 Formula One World Championship. It was driven by Jacques Villeneuve, the reigning champion, and Heinz-Harald Frentzen, who was in his second year with the team.

== Design ==
Ahead of the season, Williams were adversely affected by the departure of Chief Designer Adrian Newey to McLaren, and Renault's withdrawal from F1 as an engine supplier. Newey and Renault had made Williams the dominant team of the early and mid-1990s. Whilst Newey had departed at the end of the 1996 season, he had directly contributed to the championship winning FW19. This made the FW20 the first non-Newey designed car since 1990. Cosmetically the FW20 resembled the FW19 with journalist Joe Saward noting the FW20 followed the same basic design concept as the FW19 with adaptations made to comply with 1998 regulations. The car was equipped with a Mecachrome-badged version of what was essentially the previous year's Renault engine.

At the car's launch in January, Patrick Head and Geoff Willis admitted that the FW20 was a fairly conservative design but stressed that they were still hopeful of being competitive.

== Season summary ==
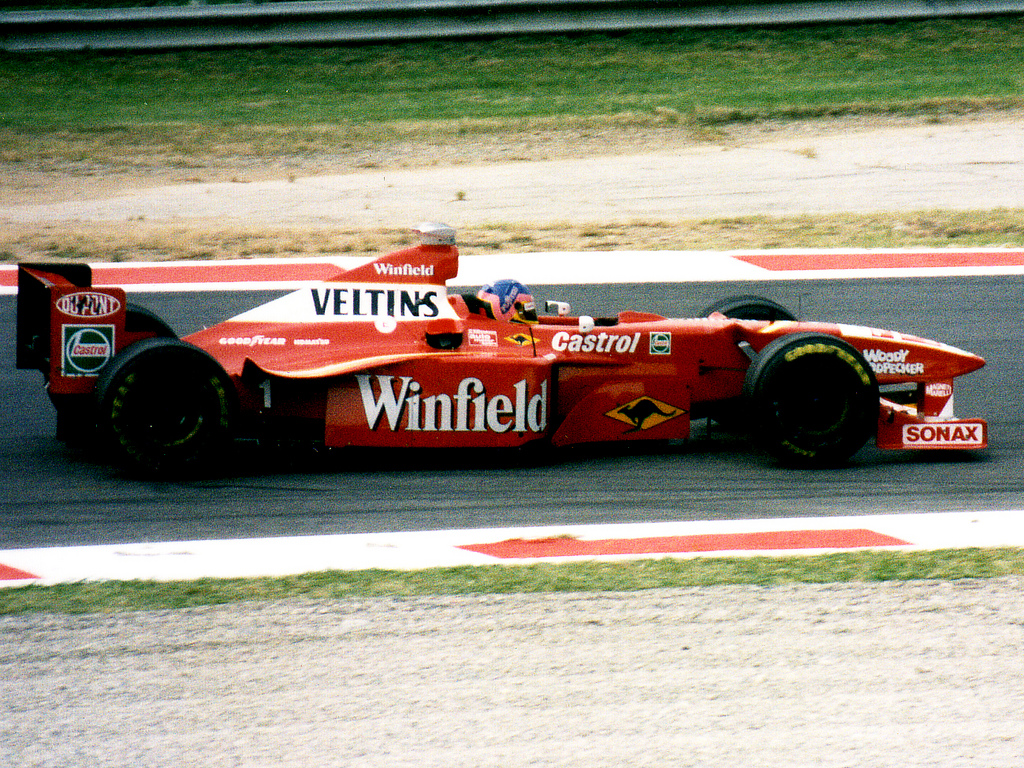
The FW20 at the 1998 Italian Grand Prix

Williams began testing the FW20 ahead of the launch in January 1998, utilising parts from the new car and the previous season's FW19. A key change between seasons was the introduction of grooved tyres, although Williams remained with supplier Goodyear. At the opening round in Melbourne, Frentzen finished third, albeit a lap down on the leading two McLarens. Overall however, this would be one of the few highlights of the FW20 during 1998.

Villeneuve never looked in serious contention to defend his drivers' title, nor was the team as a whole a serious contender to retain their constructors' crown with the FW20 which was not competitive relative to the 1998 front running cars - the Adrian Newey-designed McLaren MP4/13 and the Ferrari F300. Villeneuve scored points at nine Grands Prix with season-high third place finishes at the German Grand Prix and the Hungarian Grand Prix. During practice for the Belgian Grand Prix, he lost control of his car in the Eau Rouge corner and crashed backwards into the barrier at approximately 170 mph (270 km/h). Villeneuve was unhurt. With 21 points, he finished fifth in the Drivers' Championship.

For Frentzen, the opening round podium would be his season highlight, scoring points only on six further occasions with a high of fourth place in Belgium. The German driver suffered five consecutive DNFs including collisions both in Monaco with Eddie Irvine at Loews hairpin, and at Canada where a clash with Michael Schumacher saw him spin and retire.

1998 was Williams' first season without a win since 1988 and they would finish a distant third behind McLaren and Ferrari in the constructors championship. At the end of the season, Villeneuve and Frentzen would depart for British American Racing and Jordan Grand Prix respectively.

Williams new 1999 drivers Ralf Schumacher and Alex Zanardi tested the FW20 at Barcelona after the season had concluded, with Schumacher scoring table topping times. The FW20 would also be tested by Juan Pablo Montoya, Tommi Mäkinen and Mick Doohan.

== Sponsorship and livery ==
In a departure from past seasons, the previous white and blue Williams livery was replaced by a striking all red colour scheme with white and gold accent colours. This significant colour change to the teams visual identity was due to main sponsor Rothmans opting to use the space they had vacated to promote sister brand Winfield as the team's new title sponsor.

Therefore, Williams used 'Winfield' logos on the FW20, except at the French, British and German Grands Prix where they were replaced with a Winfield kangaroo emblem and a leaping kangaroo instead and with text "Williams Racing Team". In Canada, the kangaroo emblem was replaced with a yellow barcode and with text "Winfield Racing Williams F1 Racing Team". In the French Grand Prix, the Veltins logo was completely removed. These changes to the livery occurred at events where tobacco and alcohol advertising were forbidden.

The Universal Studios and Woody Woodpecker logos also featured on the nose cone in certain Grands Prix. At the Australian Grand Prix, the team promoted the film, Blues Brothers 2000, also featured on the nose cone.

== Later use ==
On December 1999, an FW20 was painted in dark blue and white livery, fitted with a BMW V10 engine and ran on Bridgestone tyres. The car was test driven by Jörg Müller.

== Complete Formula One results ==
(key) (results in bold indicate pole position)

Year	Team	Engine	Tyres	Drivers	1	2	3	4	5	6	7	8	9	10	11	12	13	14	15	16	Points	WCC
1998	Williams	Mecachrome V10	**G**		AUS	BRA	ARG	SMR	ESP	MON	CAN	FRA	GBR	AUT	GER	HUN	BEL	ITA	LUX	JPN	**38**	**3rd**
1998	Williams	Mecachrome V10	**G**	Jacques Villeneuve	5	7	Ret	4	6	5	10	4	7	6	3	3	Ret	Ret	8	6	**38**	**3rd**
1998	Williams	Mecachrome V10	**G**	Heinz-Harald Frentzen	3	5	9	5	8	Ret	Ret	15^{†}	Ret	Ret	9	5	4	7	5	5	**38**	**3rd**

== Sponsors ==
Brand	Country	Placed on
Winfield	Australia	Rear wing, fin, sidepods, front wing, barge board
Komatsu	Japan	Fin
Sonax	Germany	Front wing end plate
Castrol	United Kingdom	Rear wing end plate, mirrors, nose, side
Falke	Germany	Front wing
Auto Motor und Sport	Germany	Nose, fin
Veltins	Germany	Fin, nose
Magneti Marelli	Italy	Wing pillar
Woody Woodpecker	United States	Nose cone

== Sources ==
- AUTOCOURSE 1998-99, Henry, Alan (ed.), Hazleton Publishing Ltd. (1998) ISBN 1-874557-43-8
- Downey, Michael, ed. (1998). 1998 Formula One Yearbook: Chronicle of the Grand Prix Year. London, England: Dorling Kindersley. ISBN 0-7894-3754-6 – via Open Library.
- Sparling, Ken (1999). Champion Sport Biographies: Jacques Villeneuve. Toronto, Ontario: Warwick Publishing. ISBN 978-1-894020-57-2 – via Open Library.
