= 1997 Hungarian Grand Prix =

Formula One motor race held in 1997

Race 11 of 17 in the 1997 Formula One World Championship
← Previous race	Next race →

Race details
- Date: August 10, 1997
- Official name: XIII Marlboro Magyar Nagydij
- Location: Hungaroring, Mogyoród, Pest, Hungary
- Course: Permanent racing facility
- Course length: 3.968 km (2.466 miles)
- Distance: 77 laps, 305.536 km (189,851 miles)
- Weather: Sunny, Dry Track, 27°C

Pole position
Driver	(Germany) Michael Schumacher	Ferrari
- Time: 1:14.672

Fastest lap
Driver	(Germany) Heinz-Harald Frentzen	Williams-Renault
- Time: 1:18.372 on lap 25

Podium
First	(Canada) Jacques Villeneuve	Williams-Renault
Second	(United Kingdom) Damon Hill	Arrows-Yamaha
Third	(United Kingdom) Johnny Herbert	Sauber-Petronas

The 1997 Hungarian Grand Prix (formally the XIII Marlboro Magyar Nagydij) was a Formula One motor race held at Hungaroring, Mogyoród, Pest, Hungary on 10 August 1997. The race, contested over 77 laps, was the eleventh race of the 1997 Formula One World Championship and was won by Jacques Villeneuve, driving a Williams-Renault, with Damon Hill second in an Arrows-Yamaha and Johnny Herbert third in a Sauber-Petronas.

Defending World Champion Hill, who had been having a poor year in the uncompetitive and unreliable Arrows, had led comfortably for most of the race, after qualifying third behind championship challengers Michael Schumacher and Villeneuve. However, a hydraulic failure resulted in Villeneuve passing him on the final lap. It was to be the closest the Arrows team ever came to a Grand Prix victory and would turn out to be their final podium finish.

The win was Villeneuve's fifth of the season and moved him to within three points of Schumacher in the Drivers' Championship, the Ferrari driver having only managed fourth in the race. Shinji Nakano scored his last world championship points at this race.

== Report ==
=== Background ===
Heading into the eleventh round of the season, Ferrari driver Michael Schumacher was leading the Drivers' Championship with 53 points; ahead of Williams driver Jacques Villeneuve on 43 points, and the two Benetton drivers, Jean Alesi and Gerhard Berger, on 22 and 20 points respectively. The Constructors' Championship was closer at the front, with Ferrari on 71 points leading Williams on 62 points.

=== Practice and qualifying ===
Hill, as defending world champion, until then had experienced a bad year in the backmarker Arrows-Yamaha car and was 17th in the overall championship standings. But arriving in Hungary, he set the fifth fastest time on Friday practice after just a single flying lap, after sitting for 55 minutes in the garage while his mechanics tore the gearbox off the car, looking for an electronic sensor problem. Later, Hill qualified in 3rd place behind Villeneuve, with Schumacher claiming pole position. Hill's teammate Pedro Diniz qualified in 19th position.

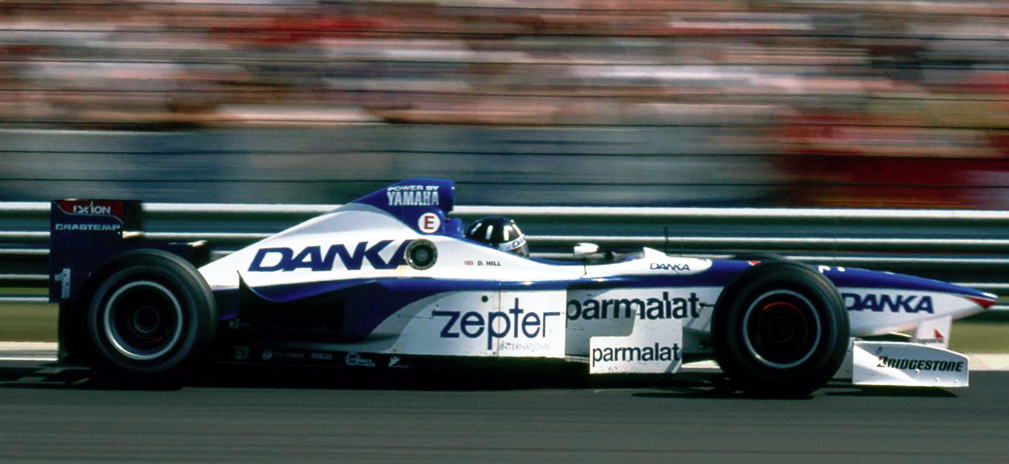
Damon Hill led most of the race in the Arrows Yamaha

=== Race ===
Hill made a strong start from his third position, overtaking Villeneuve, and he then caught race leader Schumacher on lap 6. Schumacher had to use a spare car for the race and soon struggled with pace all race long. By then, both drivers had pulled away from the rest of the field. On lap 11, Hill overtook Schumacher, and would eventually be leading the race by over 35 seconds from Villeneuve.

The slow pace of the German driver permitted several drivers to close on him. Mika Häkkinen, one of the drivers chasing Schumacher, retired on lap 12, meanwhile the Ferrari driver would soon pit for the first of three times in the race. The slow Schumacher permitted Hill to open a reasonable gap to the others behind and never was contested for the lead, specially after a slow pit stop for Jacques Villeneuve.

For most of the race, Coulthard chased Villeneuve closely for second place, being denied with another mechanical retiring. On the other hand, struggling Schumacher formed a trail behind him being chased for his brother Ralf, Shinji Nakano and teammate Eddie Irvine. Yellow lights turned on at Arrows when Pedro Diniz retired with mechanical failure.

On lap 74, with three laps left, the hydraulic pump failed on Hill's car, causing it to become stuck in third gear and have an intermittent throttle. As a result, Hill started losing time and was overtaken by Villeneuve part-way through the final lap. Villeneuve won the race with Hill finishing second, and Johnny Herbert took the third place on the podium. Eddie Irvine, who had passed Nakano for the final point, lost it on the last lap to the Japanese driver when his car broke down.

After the race, the problem, which denied Arrows, Bridgestone, and Yamaha their first ever victories (in the case of Arrows and Yamaha, their only ever victories), was diagnosed as a throttle linkage failure, caused by a broken washer worth 50 pence.

Johnny Herbert scored his only podium of the season, while Shinji Nakano equalled his career-best finish of 6th. Gianni Morbidelli returned for Sauber in place of Norberto Fontana after missing three races through injury. Hill's second position also marked the best ever result for Yamaha engines in Formula One.

== Classification ==
=== Qualifying ===
Pos	No	Driver	Constructor	Time	Difference
1	5	(Germany) Michael Schumacher	Ferrari	1:14.672	
2	3	(Canada) Jacques Villeneuve	Williams-Renault	1:14.859	+ 0.187
3	1	(United Kingdom) Damon Hill	Arrows-Yamaha	1:15.044	+ 0.372
4	9	(Finland) Mika Häkkinen	McLaren-Mercedes	1:15.140	+ 0.468
5	6	(United Kingdom) Eddie Irvine	Ferrari	1:15.424	+ 0.752
6	4	(Germany) Heinz-Harald Frentzen	Williams-Renault	1:15.520	+ 0.848
7	8	(Austria) Gerhard Berger	Benetton-Renault	1:15.699	+ 1.027
8	10	(United Kingdom) David Coulthard	McLaren-Mercedes	1:15.705	+ 1.033
9	7	(France) Jean Alesi	Benetton-Renault	1:15.905	+ 1.233
10	16	(United Kingdom) Johnny Herbert	Sauber-Petronas	1:16.138	+ 1.466
11	22	(Brazil) Rubens Barrichello	Stewart-Ford	1:16.138	+ 1.466
12	14	(Italy) Jarno Trulli	Prost-Mugen-Honda	1:16.297	+ 1.625
13	12	(Italy) Giancarlo Fisichella	Jordan-Peugeot	1:16.300	+ 1.628
14	11	(Germany) Ralf Schumacher	Jordan-Peugeot	1:16.686	+ 2.014
15	17	(Italy) Gianni Morbidelli	Sauber-Petronas	1:16.766	+ 2.094
16	15	(Japan) Shinji Nakano	Prost-Mugen-Honda	1:16.784	+ 2.112
17	23	(Denmark) Jan Magnussen	Stewart-Ford	1:16.858	+ 2.186
18	18	(Netherlands) Jos Verstappen	Tyrrell-Ford	1:17.095	+ 2.423
19	2	(Brazil) Pedro Diniz	Arrows-Yamaha	1:17.118	+ 2.446
20	20	(Japan) Ukyo Katayama	Minardi-Hart	1:17.232	+ 2.560
21	19	(Finland) Mika Salo	Tyrrell-Ford	1:17.482	+ 2.810
22	21	(Brazil) Tarso Marques	Minardi-Hart	1:18.020	+ 3.348
107% time: 1:19.899

=== Race ===
Pos	No	Driver	Constructor	Laps	Time/Retired	Grid	Points
1	3	(Canada) Jacques Villeneuve	Williams-Renault	77	1:45:47.149	2	10
2	1	(United Kingdom) Damon Hill	Arrows-Yamaha	77	+9.079	3	6
3	16	(United Kingdom) Johnny Herbert	Sauber-Petronas	77	+20.445	10	4
4	5	(Germany) Michael Schumacher	Ferrari	77	+30.501	1	3
5	11	(Germany) Ralf Schumacher	Jordan-Peugeot	77	+30.715	14	2
6	15	(Japan) Shinji Nakano	Prost-Mugen-Honda	77	+41.512	16	1
7	14	(Italy) Jarno Trulli	Prost-Mugen-Honda	77	+1:15.552	12	
8	8	(Austria) Gerhard Berger	Benetton-Renault	77	+1:16.409	7	
9	6	(United Kingdom) Eddie Irvine	Ferrari	76	Spun off	5	
10	20	(Japan) Ukyo Katayama	Minardi-Hart	76	+1 lap	20	
11	7	(France) Jean Alesi	Benetton-Renault	76	+1 lap	9	
12	21	(Brazil) Tarso Marques	Minardi-Hart	75	+2 laps	22	
13	19	(Finland) Mika Salo	Tyrrell-Ford	75	+2 laps	21	
Ret	10	(United Kingdom) David Coulthard	McLaren-Mercedes	65	Electrical	8	
Ret	18	(Netherlands) Jos Verstappen	Tyrrell-Ford	61	Gearbox	18	
Ret	2	(Brazil) Pedro Diniz	Arrows-Yamaha	53	Electrical	19	
Ret	12	(Italy) Giancarlo Fisichella	Jordan-Peugeot	42	Spun off	13	
Ret	4	(Germany) Heinz-Harald Frentzen	Williams-Renault	29	Fuel leak	6	
Ret	22	(Brazil) Rubens Barrichello	Stewart-Ford	29	Engine	11	
Ret	9	(Finland) Mika Häkkinen	McLaren-Mercedes	12	Hydraulics	4	
Ret	17	(Italy) Gianni Morbidelli	Sauber-Petronas	7	Engine	15	
Ret	23	(Denmark) Jan Magnussen	Stewart-Ford	5	Accident	17	

== Championship standings after the race ==
Drivers' Championship standings

Pos	Driver	Points
1	(Germany) Michael Schumacher	56
2	(Canada) Jacques Villeneuve	53
3	(France) Jean Alesi	22
4	(Austria) Gerhard Berger	20
5	(Germany) Heinz-Harald Frentzen	19

Constructors' Championship standings

Pos	Constructor	Points
1	(Italy) Ferrari	74
2	(United Kingdom) Williams-Renault	72
3	(Italy) Benetton-Renault	46
4	(United Kingdom) McLaren-Mercedes	28
5	(France) Prost-Mugen-Honda	20

- Note: Only the top five positions are included for both sets of standings.

Previous race: 1997 German Grand Prix	FIA Formula One World Championship; 1997 season	Next race: 1997 Belgian Grand Prix
Previous race: 1996 Hungarian Grand Prix	Hungarian Grand Prix	Next race: 1998 Hungarian Grand Prix
