= 1997 Argentine Grand Prix =

Race 3 of 17 in the 1997 Formula One World Championship
← Previous race	Next race →

Race details
- Date: 13 April 1997
- Official name: XX Gran Premio Marlboro de la Republica Argentina
- Location: Autódromo Oscar Alfredo Gálvez; Buenos Aires, Argentina
- Course: Permanent racing facility
- Course length: 4.259 km (2.646 miles)
- Distance: 72 laps, 306.648 km (190.542 miles)
- Weather: Partially cloudy and dry, with temperatures reaching up to 21 °C (70 °F)

Pole position
Driver	(Canada) Jacques Villeneuve	Williams-Renault
- Time: 1:24.473

Fastest lap
Driver	(Austria) Gerhard Berger	Benetton-Renault
- Time: 1:27.981 on lap 63

Podium
First	(Canada) Jacques Villeneuve	Williams-Renault
Second	(United Kingdom) Eddie Irvine	Ferrari
Third	(Germany) Ralf Schumacher	Jordan-Peugeot

The 1997 Argentine Grand Prix was a Formula One motor race held at Autódromo Oscar Alfredo Gálvez in Buenos Aires, Argentina on 13 April 1997. It was the third race of the 1997 Formula One World Championship, and the 600th World Championship Grand Prix.

The 72-lap race was won from pole position by Jacques Villeneuve, driving a Williams-Renault. Eddie Irvine finished second in a Ferrari, while Ralf Schumacher, in only his third F1 race, finished third in a Jordan-Peugeot.

== Summary ==
=== Pre-race ===
Most of the talk before the grand prix was about Heinz-Harald Frentzen and Eddie Irvine and their poor starts to the season. Despite going out of business, Lola Team Principal Eric Broadley was confident that the team could be up and running again by the San Marino Grand Prix, albeit with a new main sponsor. The Tyrrell team also caused a stir after arriving at the grand prix with four new wings on the car, two on the nose cone, the other two alongside the drivers head. They resembled x-wings and this was soon used as their nickname. The practice session bought no surprises with the two Williams cars first and second.

=== Qualifying ===
As with the practice session, both Williams were once again on the front row, with Jacques Villeneuve on pole. The first real surprise of the weekend was the performance of Olivier Panis in the Prost, who managed to qualify third on the grid. Another strong performance was the fifth place of Rubens Barrichello in the Stewart. As expected, both McLarens qualified low down the field, complaining of poor handling on the bumpy surface. The slowest qualifier Pedro Diniz's lap time would have still been comfortably fast enough to have put him on pole for the previous year's race.

=== Race ===
As the red lights went out, Jacques Villeneuve cleanly navigated the first corner and began to pull away from the other front runners. Michael Schumacher (who was unsighted by oil from Frentzen's car) almost collided with Panis, but the Frenchman moved off line to drop a few places rather than to collide with the Ferrari. Going into the first corner, Michael Schumacher was alongside his teammate Irvine and Rubens Barrichello. However, Michael then understeered and crashed into the back of Barrichello's car causing the Brazilian to spin and getting himself to retire. Barrichello would eventually change his front nose and get going again. But in the melee, Coulthard crashed into the back of Ralf Schumacher's Jordan, ripping of his front wheel and putting him out of the race. The track was unpassable with the back of the field taking to the grass to get round the incident, so the Safety Car was called out.

The biggest improvement was made by Pedro Diniz, who climbed eleven places from last to 11th spot on the first lap. At the restart after 4 laps, Villeneuve once again pulled away from Frentzen and Panis, but Frentzen's race ended on lap 6 with throttle problems. The chance of victory for Prost ended on lap 18, also with throttle problems. Both Arrows drivers showed a strong run on the first third of the race, with Damon Hill chasing Jean Alesi for the sixth place and Pedro Diniz in 8th holding Jos Verstappen, Gerhard Berger and Mika Häkkinen. When Damon Hill and Jean Alesi tangled braking into Turn 1, Diniz was able to slip by both.

On lap 24 the two Jordans collided with Giancarlo Fisichella retiring from the race. Hill, who was up to 4th at one point, retired with engine failure on lap 33, meanwhile his teammate suffered with a long pit stop, which costed him more than fifty seconds, dropped back and retired with engine failure too. Although in the final few laps Irvine closed the gap to Villeneuve, the Canadian held tight and went on to win his sixth career grand prix. Irvine finished second, the highest finish of his career at that point, with Ralf Schumacher scoring his first podium in third.

=== Post-race ===
On the podium the organisers flew the Irish tricolour for Irvine, instead of the Union Jack that was usually flown for Northern Irish drivers. Although Irvine identifies himself as Irish despite holding a British passport, his parents' house in County Down was targeted by loyalists as they felt they had been betrayed by the Ferrari driver. Irvine subsequently asked for a white flag with a shamrock to be used if he secured another podium finish; however, the FIA insisted that the Union Jack be used in future.

== Classification ==
=== Qualifying ===
Pos	No	Driver	Constructor	Time	Gap
1	3	(Canada) Jacques Villeneuve	Williams-Renault	1:24.473	
2	4	(Germany) Heinz-Harald Frentzen	Williams-Renault	1:25.271	+0.798
3	14	(France) Olivier Panis	Prost-Mugen-Honda	1:25.491	+1.018
4	5	(Germany) Michael Schumacher	Ferrari	1:25.773	+1.300
5	22	(Brazil) Rubens Barrichello	Stewart-Ford	1:25.942	+1.469
6	11	(Germany) Ralf Schumacher	Jordan-Peugeot	1:26.218	+1.745
7	6	(United Kingdom) Eddie Irvine	Ferrari	1:26.327	+1.854
8	16	(United Kingdom) Johnny Herbert	Sauber-Petronas	1:26.564	+2.091
9	12	(Italy) Giancarlo Fisichella	Jordan-Peugeot	1:26.619	+2.149
10	10	(United Kingdom) David Coulthard	McLaren-Mercedes	1:26.799	+2.326
11	7	(France) Jean Alesi	Benetton-Renault	1:27.076	+2.603
12	8	(Austria) Gerhard Berger	Benetton-Renault	1:27.259	+2.786
13	1	(United Kingdom) Damon Hill	Arrows-Yamaha	1:27.281	+2.808
14	17	(Italy) Nicola Larini	Sauber-Petronas	1:27.690	+3.217
15	23	(Denmark) Jan Magnussen	Stewart-Ford	1:28.035	+3.562
16	18	(Netherlands) Jos Verstappen	Tyrrell-Ford	1:28.094	+3.621
17	9	(Finland) Mika Häkkinen	McLaren-Mercedes	1:28.135	+3.662
18	21	(Italy) Jarno Trulli	Minardi-Hart	1:28.160	+3.687
19	19	(Finland) Mika Salo	Tyrrell-Ford	1:28.224	+3.751
20	15	(Japan) Shinji Nakano	Prost-Mugen-Honda	1:28.366	+3.893
21	20	(Japan) Ukyo Katayama	Minardi-Hart	1:28.413	+3.940
22	2	(Brazil) Pedro Diniz	Arrows-Yamaha	1:28.969	+4.496
107% time : 1:30.386

=== Race ===
Pos	No	Driver	Constructor	Laps	Time/Retired	Grid	Points
1	3	(Canada) Jacques Villeneuve	Williams-Renault	72	1:52:01.715	1	10
2	6	(United Kingdom) Eddie Irvine	Ferrari	72	+0.979	7	6
3	11	(Germany) Ralf Schumacher	Jordan-Peugeot	72	+12.089	6	4
4	16	(United Kingdom) Johnny Herbert	Sauber-Petronas	72	+29.919	8	3
5	9	(Finland) Mika Häkkinen	McLaren-Mercedes	72	+30.351	17	2
6	8	(Austria) Gerhard Berger	Benetton-Renault	72	+31.393	12	1
7	7	(France) Jean Alesi	Benetton-Renault	72	+46.359	11	
8	19	(Finland) Mika Salo	Tyrrell-Ford	71	+1 lap	19	
9	21	(Italy) Jarno Trulli	Minardi-Hart	71	+1 lap	18	
10	23	(Denmark) Jan Magnussen	Stewart-Ford	66	Engine	15	
Ret	17	(Italy) Nicola Larini	Sauber-Petronas	63	Spun off	14	
Ret	2	(Brazil) Pedro Diniz	Arrows-Yamaha	50	Engine	22	
Ret	15	(Japan) Shinji Nakano	Prost-Mugen-Honda	49	Engine	20	
Ret	18	(Netherlands) Jos Verstappen	Tyrrell-Ford	43	Engine	16	
Ret	20	(Japan) Ukyo Katayama	Minardi-Hart	37	Spun off	21	
Ret	1	(United Kingdom) Damon Hill	Arrows-Yamaha	33	Engine	13	
Ret	12	(Italy) Giancarlo Fisichella	Jordan-Peugeot	24	Collision	9	
Ret	22	(Brazil) Rubens Barrichello	Stewart-Ford	24	Hydraulics	5	
Ret	14	(France) Olivier Panis	Prost-Mugen-Honda	18	Electrical	3	
Ret	4	(Germany) Heinz-Harald Frentzen	Williams-Renault	5	Clutch	2	
Ret	5	(Germany) Michael Schumacher	Ferrari	0	Collision	4	
Ret	10	(United Kingdom) David Coulthard	McLaren-Mercedes	0	Collision	10	

== Championship standings after the race ==
Drivers' Championship standings

Pos	Driver	Points
1	(Canada) Jacques Villeneuve	20
2	(United Kingdom) David Coulthard	10
3	(Austria) Gerhard Berger	10
4	(Finland) Mika Häkkinen	9
5	(Germany) Michael Schumacher	8

Constructors' Championship standings

Pos	Constructor	Points
1	(United Kingdom) Williams-Renault	20
2	(United Kingdom) McLaren-Mercedes	19
3	(Italy) Ferrari	14
4	(Italy) Benetton-Renault	11
5	(France) Prost-Mugen-Honda	6

First podium: Ralf Schumacher

- Note: Only the top five positions are included for both sets of standings.

Previous race: 1997 Brazilian Grand Prix	FIA Formula One World Championship; 1997 season	Next race: 1997 San Marino Grand Prix
Previous race: 1996 Argentine Grand Prix	Argentine Grand Prix	Next race: 1998 Argentine Grand Prix
