= 1997 Austrian Grand Prix =

Race 14 of 17 in the 1997 Formula One World Championship
← Previous race	Next race →

Race details
- Date: 21 September 1997
- Official name: Grosser Preis von Österreich 1997
- Location: A1-Ring; Spielberg, Styria, Austria
- Course: Permanent racing facility
- Course length: 4.323 km (2.697 miles)
- Distance: 71 laps, 306.933 km (191.474 miles)
- Weather: Sunny

Pole position
Driver	(Canada) Jacques Villeneuve	Williams-Renault
- Time: 1:10.304

Fastest lap
Driver	(Canada) Jacques Villeneuve	Williams-Renault
- Time: 1:11.814 on lap 36

Podium
First	(Canada) Jacques Villeneuve	Williams-Renault
Second	(United Kingdom) David Coulthard	McLaren-Mercedes
Third	(Germany) Heinz-Harald Frentzen	Williams-Renault

The 1997 Austrian Grand Prix (formally the Grosser Preis von Österreich 1997) was a Formula One motor race held at the A1-Ring on 21 September 1997. It was the fourteenth race of the 1997 Formula One World Championship, and the first Austrian Grand Prix since 1987.

The 71-lap race was won by Canadian driver Jacques Villeneuve, driving a Williams-Renault, after he started from pole position. Italian Jarno Trulli led the first half of the race in his Prost-Mugen-Honda, but later retired with an engine failure. Briton David Coulthard finished second in a McLaren-Mercedes, with Villeneuve's German teammate Heinz-Harald Frentzen third.

Villeneuve's rival for the Drivers' Championship, German Michael Schumacher, could only manage sixth in his Ferrari, allowing Villeneuve to close to within one point of him with three races remaining.

== Report ==
Qualifying threw up a few surprises, as the Bridgestone tyres used by several smaller teams proved strong, but it was ultimately Jacques Villeneuve who won. Mika Häkkinen had been leading Villeneuve after the start but his engine failed yet again, before he even managed to complete the first lap. So, for the first time in his Formula One career, Jarno Trulli led the race, followed by Rubens Barrichello, Jacques Villeneuve, Jan Magnussen, Heinz-Harald Frentzen and Michael Schumacher in the top six.

By lap 13, Trulli had built a gap of 4.5 seconds from Barrichello, who was being chasing closely by Villeneuve. Behind them both, seven seconds apart, Magnussen was holding a train formed by himself, Frentzen, Michael Schumacher, David Coulthard and Damon Hill. On lap 24, the first change to the top six: Villeneuve outbraked Barrichello in turn 4 and climbed to second place. The gap of leader Trulli from the Canadian was 10 seconds, with Barrichello losing traction on third, 5 seconds behind the Williams driver; on lap 26, Magnussen pitted for the first time, dropping outside the points.

A spectacular collision occurred between Eddie Irvine and Jean Alesi. As they battled for 4th place on lap 37, Alesi tried to outbrake Irvine into the chicane from approximately eight car-lengths behind, and as Irvine took evasive action, the Frenchman drove into the Northern Irishman's car at such speed that Alesi's car went over the top of Irvine's while the latter was pitched into a spin. Alesi was placed under investigation by the stewards for dangerous driving after the race, although no charges were formally brought against either driver.

On the same lap, Trulli pitted and gave the lead to Villeneuve. The Canadian took advantage of the clean track and set a pace enough to keep him in the lead even after his only pit stop. On lap 45, after all the leaders had pitted, the top six were Villeneuve, Trulli, Michael Schumacher, Barrichello, Magnussen and Coulthard.

Michael Schumacher ran as high as 3rd, but received a stop-go penalty for overtaking Heinz-Harald Frentzen under yellow flags. Schumacher claimed he had not seen them, and that they were not visible on the inside of the corner. To get it worst, Schumacher exited the pits behind Barrichello, who had just pitted for his second and last time.

On lap 57, the top six were Villeneuve, Trulli, Coulthard, Frentzen, Fisichella and Ralf Schumacher. Yellow lights turned on at Prost as Shinji Nakano retired with engine failure. One lap later, the fairytale ended for Trulli, with his Mugen Honda engine giving up. Running on a two-stop strategy, the Stewarts had dropped outside the points. And after a strong pace, Jan Magnussen retired also with engine failure.

By lap 64, the top six were Villeneuve, Coulthard, Frentzen, Fisichella, Ralf Schumacher and Damon Hill, with Barrichello and Schumacher behind the 1996 World Champion. Approaching turn 9, Schumacher dived inside Barrichello, the Brazilian closed the door, braked later but ran on the oil left on track by Trulli's engine and spun off. With two laps remaining, Schumacher chased Damon Hill and outbraked the Arrows driver on turn 3, taking the last points-paying position. This single point kept Schumacher in the championship lead by one point clear from Villeneuve.

Austrian Formula One veteran Gerhard Berger announced he was to retire at the end of the season, shortly after he qualified 18th on the grid.

== Classification ==
=== Qualifying ===
Pos	No	Driver	Constructor	Time	Gap
1	3	(Canada) Jacques Villeneuve	Williams-Renault	1:10.304	
2	9	(Finland) Mika Häkkinen	McLaren-Mercedes	1:10.398	+0.094
3	14	(Italy) Jarno Trulli	Prost-Mugen-Honda	1:10.511	+0.207
4	4	(Germany) Heinz-Harald Frentzen	Williams-Renault	1:10.670	+0.366
5	22	(Brazil) Rubens Barrichello	Stewart-Ford	1:10.700	+0.396
6	23	(Denmark) Jan Magnussen	Stewart-Ford	1:10.893	+0.589
7	1	(United Kingdom) Damon Hill	Arrows-Yamaha	1:11.025	+0.721
8	6	(United Kingdom) Eddie Irvine	Ferrari	1:11.051	+0.747
9	5	(Germany) Michael Schumacher	Ferrari	1:11.056	+0.752
10	10	(United Kingdom) David Coulthard	McLaren-Mercedes	1:11.076	+0.772
11	11	(Germany) Ralf Schumacher	Jordan-Peugeot	1:11.186	+0.882
12	16	(United Kingdom) Johnny Herbert	Sauber-Petronas	1:11.210	+0.906
13	17	(Italy) Gianni Morbidelli	Sauber-Petronas	1:11.261	+0.957
14	12	(Italy) Giancarlo Fisichella	Jordan-Peugeot	1:11.299	+0.995
15	7	(France) Jean Alesi	Benetton-Renault	1:11.382	+1.078
16	15	(Japan) Shinji Nakano	Prost-Mugen-Honda	1:11.596	+1.292
17	2	(Brazil) Pedro Diniz	Arrows-Yamaha	1:11.615	+1.311
18	8	(Austria) Gerhard Berger	Benetton-Renault	1:11.620	+1.316
19	20	(Japan) Ukyo Katayama	Minardi-Hart	1:12.036	+1.732
20	18	(Netherlands) Jos Verstappen	Tyrrell-Ford	1:12.230	+1.926
EX	21	(Brazil) Tarso Marques	Minardi-Hart	1:12.304	+2.000
21	19	(Finland) Mika Salo	Tyrrell-Ford	1:14.246	+3.942
107% time: 1:15.225

Notes

- Tarso Marques was excluded from taking part in the race after his car was found to be underweight after qualifying.

=== Race ===
Pos	No	Driver	Constructor	Laps	Time/Retired	Grid	Points
1	3	(Canada) Jacques Villeneuve	Williams-Renault	71	1:27:35.999	1	10
2	10	(United Kingdom) David Coulthard	McLaren-Mercedes	71	+2.909	10	6
3	4	(Germany) Heinz-Harald Frentzen	Williams-Renault	71	+3.962	4	4
4	12	(Italy) Giancarlo Fisichella	Jordan-Peugeot	71	+12.127	14	3
5	11	(Germany) Ralf Schumacher	Jordan-Peugeot	71	+31.859	11	2
6	5	(Germany) Michael Schumacher	Ferrari	71	+33.410	9	1
7	1	(United Kingdom) Damon Hill	Arrows-Yamaha	71	+37.207	7	
8	16	(United Kingdom) Johnny Herbert	Sauber-Petronas	71	+49.057	12	
9	17	(Italy) Gianni Morbidelli	Sauber-Petronas	71	+1:06.455	13	
10	8	(Austria) Gerhard Berger	Benetton-Renault	70	+1 lap	18	
11	20	(Japan) Ukyo Katayama	Minardi-Hart	69	+2 laps	19	
12	18	(Netherlands) Jos Verstappen	Tyrrell-Ford	69	+2 laps	20	
13	2	(Brazil) Pedro Diniz	Arrows-Yamaha	67	Suspension	17	
14	22	(Brazil) Rubens Barrichello	Stewart-Ford	64	Spun off	5	
Ret	14	(Italy) Jarno Trulli	Prost-Mugen-Honda	58	Engine	3	
Ret	23	(Denmark) Jan Magnussen	Stewart-Ford	58	Engine	6	
Ret	15	(Japan) Shinji Nakano	Prost-Mugen-Honda	57	Engine	16	
Ret	19	(Finland) Mika Salo	Tyrrell-Ford	48	Gearbox	21	
Ret	6	(United Kingdom) Eddie Irvine	Ferrari	38	Collision damage	8	
Ret	7	(France) Jean Alesi	Benetton-Renault	37	Collision	15	
Ret	9	(Finland) Mika Häkkinen	McLaren-Mercedes	1	Engine	2	
EX	21	(Brazil) Tarso Marques	Minardi-Hart		Excluded		

== Championship standings after the race ==
Drivers' Championship standings

Pos	Driver	Points
1	(Germany) Michael Schumacher	68
2	(Canada) Jacques Villeneuve	67
3	(Germany) Heinz-Harald Frentzen	31
4	(United Kingdom) David Coulthard	30
5	(France) Jean Alesi	28

Constructors' Championship standings

Pos	Constructor	Points
1	(United Kingdom) Williams-Renault	98
2	(Italy) Ferrari	86
3	(Italy) Benetton-Renault	53
4	(United Kingdom) McLaren-Mercedes	44
5	(Republic of Ireland) Jordan-Peugeot	33

- Note: Only the top five positions are included for both sets of standings.

Previous race: 1997 Italian Grand Prix	FIA Formula One World Championship; 1997 season	Next race: 1997 Luxembourg Grand Prix
Previous race: 1987 Austrian Grand Prix	Austrian Grand Prix	Next race: 1998 Austrian Grand Prix
