= 1997 French Grand Prix =

Race 8 of 17 in the 1997 Formula One World Championship
← Previous race	Next race →

Race details
- Date: 29 June 1997
- Official name: LXXXIII French Grand Prix
- Location: Circuit de Nevers; Magny-Cours, France
- Course: Permanent racing facility
- Course length: 4.250 km (2.641 miles)
- Distance: 72 laps, 305.814 km (190.024 miles)
- Weather: Dry at first, rain in closing stages

Pole position
Driver	(Germany) Michael Schumacher	Ferrari
- Time: 1:14.548

Fastest lap
Driver	(Germany) Michael Schumacher	Ferrari
- Time: 1:17.910 on lap 37

Podium
First	(Germany) Michael Schumacher	Ferrari
Second	(Germany) Heinz-Harald Frentzen	Williams-Renault
Third	(United Kingdom) Eddie Irvine	Ferrari

The 1997 French Grand Prix (formally the LXXXIII French Grand Prix) was a Formula One motor race held at Circuit de Nevers, Magny-Cours, France on 29 June 1997. It was the eighth race of the 1997 Formula One World Championship.

The 72-lap race was won from pole position by Ferrari driver Michael Schumacher, with teammate Eddie Irvine finishing third, and Heinz-Harald Frentzen achieving second in a Williams-Renault. This was Schumacher's third win of the season and second in succession. As a result, Schumacher had a 14-point lead in the Drivers' Championship over Jacques Villeneuve, who finished fourth in the other Williams-Renault.

== Qualifying ==
=== Qualifying report ===
Michael Schumacher achieved his second pole position in a row, meanwhile Jacques Villeneuve managed to take his worst qualifying position in the season so far. Jarno Trulli took his best qualifying position ever on his first race for Prost, Alexander Wurz outqualified teammate Jean Alesi on his only second start for Benetton and Pedro Diniz outqualified teammate 1996 World Champion Damon Hill for the first time in the season. Norberto Fontana made his first appearance for Sauber, becoming the first Argentine driver to star a Formula One race since Oscar Larrauri in 1988 Australian Grand Prix. On last spot Tarso Marques came back to the grid for Minardi.

=== Qualifying classification ===
Pos	No	Driver	Constructor	Time	Gap
1	5	(Germany) Michael Schumacher	Ferrari	1:14.548	
2	4	(Germany) Heinz-Harald Frentzen	Williams-Renault	1:14.749	+0.201
3	11	(Germany) Ralf Schumacher	Jordan-Peugeot	1:14.755	+0.207
4	3	(Canada) Jacques Villeneuve	Williams-Renault	1:14.800	+0.252
5	6	(United Kingdom) Eddie Irvine	Ferrari	1:14.860	+0.312
6	14	(Italy) Jarno Trulli	Prost-Mugen-Honda	1:14.957	+0.409
7	8	(Austria) Alexander Wurz	Benetton-Renault	1:14.986	+0.438
8	7	(France) Jean Alesi	Benetton-Renault	1:15.228	+0.680
9	10	(United Kingdom) David Coulthard	McLaren-Mercedes	1:15.270	+0.722
10	9	(Finland) Mika Häkkinen	McLaren-Mercedes	1:15.339	+0.791
11	12	(Italy) Giancarlo Fisichella	Jordan-Peugeot	1:15.453	+0.905
12	15	(Japan) Shinji Nakano	Prost-Mugen-Honda	1:15.857	+1.309
13	22	(Brazil) Rubens Barrichello	Stewart-Ford	1:15.876	+1.328
14	16	(United Kingdom) Johnny Herbert	Sauber-Petronas	1:16.018	+1.470
15	23	(Denmark) Jan Magnussen	Stewart-Ford	1:16.149	+1.601
16	2	(Brazil) Pedro Diniz	Arrows-Yamaha	1:16.536	+1.988
17	1	(United Kingdom) Damon Hill	Arrows-Yamaha	1:16.729	+2.181
18	18	(Netherlands) Jos Verstappen	Tyrrell-Ford	1:16.941	+2.393
19	19	(Finland) Mika Salo	Tyrrell-Ford	1:17.256	+2.708
20	17	(Argentina) Norberto Fontana	Sauber-Petronas	1:17.538	+2.990
21	20	(Japan) Ukyo Katayama	Minardi-Hart	1:17.563	+3.015
22	21	(Brazil) Tarso Marques	Minardi-Hart	1:18.280	+3.732
107% time: 1:19.766

== Race ==
=== Race report ===
At the beginning of the race, Michael Schumacher started from the pole position, followed closely by Frentzen in a Williams car. Damon Hill experienced difficulty from the outset, as he lost his wing at the first corner due to going off the track. Both McLaren drivers jumped from the fifth row to 6th (David Coulthard) and 7th (Mika Häkkinen), passing the Benetton drivers and Jarno Trulli. On lap 5 Tarso Marques ended his comeback race at Minardi with an engine failure on the finishing line. A tough weekend continued at Arrows, as Diniz tangled with Jos Verstappen at the Adelaide Hairpin and lost his front wing, spending more than twenty seconds in the pits and dropping to the back of the field.

The race proceeded without significant incident until the latter stages when a nearby thunderstorm brought rain to the circuit. Some drivers opted to pit for wet tyres, while others remained on their dry tyres. Under these challenging conditions, multiple drivers, including Michael Schumacher, experienced spins. Despite his spin, Schumacher was able to maintain his lead.

Ultimately, Michael Schumacher finished ahead of Frentzen by a considerable margin. During the race's conclusion, an intense battle took place among Ralf Schumacher, David Coulthard, and Jean Alesi. Concurrently, Jacques Villeneuve was striving to overtake Eddie Irvine for the final spot on the podium.

Ralf Schumacher encountered a spin, which cost him sixth place. However, as noted in the race records, Michael Schumacher (having lapped his brother) permitted Ralf to pass him at the final corner. Commentator Murray Walker deemed this move unwise at the time. On the last lap, Alesi forced Coulthard off the track, resulting in Coulthard losing fifth place. Consequently, Ralf Schumacher secured the final point, as he had managed to unlap himself.

In the race's closing moments, Villeneuve caught up to Irvine. Attempting an ambitious maneuver at the final corner, Villeneuve spun off the track but managed to rejoin the race and fend off Alesi at the finish line.

=== Race classification ===
Pos	No	Driver	Constructor	Laps	Time/Retired	Grid	Points
1	5	(Germany) Michael Schumacher	Ferrari	72	1:38:50.492	1	10
2	4	(Germany) Heinz-Harald Frentzen	Williams-Renault	72	+23.537	2	6
3	6	(United Kingdom) Eddie Irvine	Ferrari	72	+1:14.801	5	4
4	3	(Canada) Jacques Villeneuve	Williams-Renault	72	+1:21.784	4	3
5	7	(France) Jean Alesi	Benetton-Renault	72	+1:22.735	8	2
6	11	(Germany) Ralf Schumacher	Jordan-Peugeot	72	+1:29.871	3	1
7	10	(United Kingdom) David Coulthard	McLaren-Mercedes	71	Collision	9	
8	16	(United Kingdom) Johnny Herbert	Sauber-Petronas	71	+1 lap	14	
9	12	(Italy) Giancarlo Fisichella	Jordan-Peugeot	71	+1 lap	11	
10	14	(Italy) Jarno Trulli	Prost-Mugen-Honda	70	+2 laps	6	
11	20	(Japan) Ukyo Katayama	Minardi-Hart	70	+2 laps	21	
12	1	(United Kingdom) Damon Hill	Arrows-Yamaha	69	+3 laps	17	
Ret	19	(Finland) Mika Salo	Tyrrell-Ford	61	Electrical	19	
Ret	8	(Austria) Alexander Wurz	Benetton-Renault	60	Spun off	7	
Ret	2	(Brazil) Pedro Diniz	Arrows-Yamaha	58	Spun off	16	
Ret	17	(Argentina) Norberto Fontana	Sauber-Petronas	40	Spun off	20	
Ret	22	(Brazil) Rubens Barrichello	Stewart-Ford	36	Engine	13	
Ret	23	(Denmark) Jan Magnussen	Stewart-Ford	33	Brakes	15	
Ret	9	(Finland) Mika Häkkinen	McLaren-Mercedes	18	Engine	10	
Ret	18	(Netherlands) Jos Verstappen	Tyrrell-Ford	15	Spun off	18	
Ret	15	(Japan) Shinji Nakano	Prost-Mugen-Honda	7	Spun off	12	
Ret	21	(Brazil) Tarso Marques	Minardi-Hart	5	Engine	22	

== Championship standings after the race ==
Drivers' Championship standings

Pos	Driver	Points
1	(Germany) Michael Schumacher	47
2	(Canada) Jacques Villeneuve	33
3	(Germany) Heinz-Harald Frentzen	19
4	(United Kingdom) Eddie Irvine	18
5	(France) Olivier Panis	15

Constructors' Championship standings

Pos	Constructor	Points
1	(Italy) Ferrari	65
2	(United Kingdom) Williams-Renault	52
3	(Italy) Benetton-Renault	25
4	(United Kingdom) McLaren-Mercedes	21
5	(France) Prost-Mugen-Honda	16

- Note: Only the top five positions are included for both sets of standings.

Previous race: 1997 Canadian Grand Prix	FIA Formula One World Championship; 1997 season	Next race: 1997 British Grand Prix
Previous race: 1996 French Grand Prix	French Grand Prix	Next race: 1998 French Grand Prix
