= 1997 Italian Grand Prix =

Race 13 of 17 in the 1997 Formula One World Championship
| ← Previous race | Next race → |
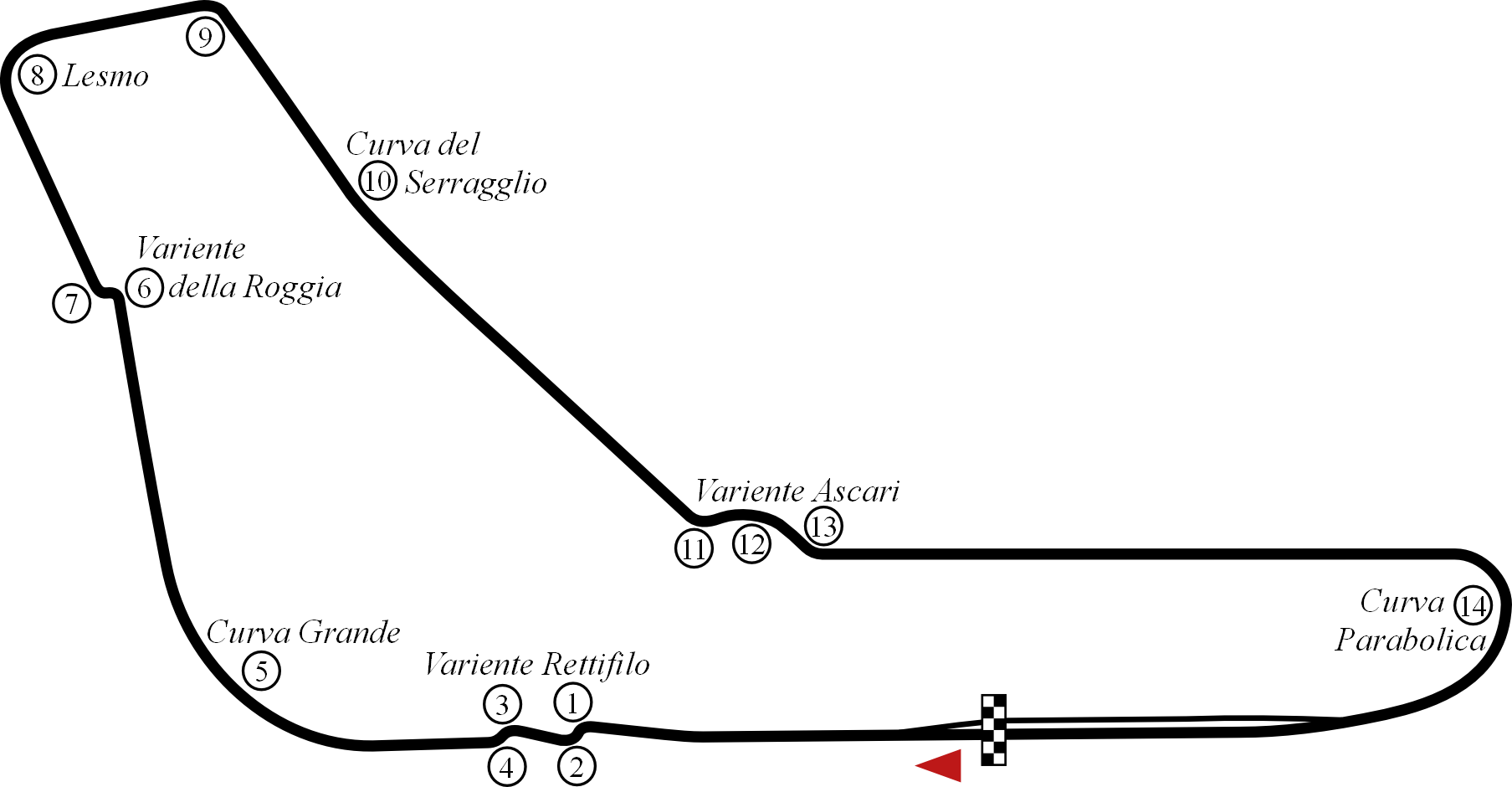

Race details
- Date: 7 September 1997
- Location: Autodromo Nazionale di Monza, Monza, Italy
- Course: Permanent racing facility
- Course length: 5.770 km (3.585 miles)
- Distance: 53 laps, 305.810 km (190.022 miles)
- Weather: Dry with temperatures reaching up to 29 °C (84 °F)

Pole position
| Driver | (France) Jean Alesi | Benetton-Renault |
- Time: 1:22.990

Fastest lap
| Driver | (Finland) Mika Häkkinen | McLaren-Mercedes |
- Time: 1:24.808 on lap 49

Podium
| First | (United Kingdom) David Coulthard | McLaren-Mercedes |
| Second | (France) Jean Alesi | Benetton-Renault |
| Third | (Germany) Heinz-Harald Frentzen | Williams-Renault |

The 1997 Italian Grand Prix was a Formula One motor race held at Autodromo Nazionale di Monza, Monza on 7 September 1997. It was the thirteenth round of the 1997 Formula One season. The 53-lap race was won by David Coulthard driving for McLaren after starting from sixth position on the grid. Jean Alesi finished second for Benetton after starting from pole position, while Heinz-Harald Frentzen finished third for Williams.

== Report ==
=== Qualifying ===
Fisichella set the early pace in qualifying. Alesi got pole position on his second set of tyres. Frentzen moved into second late in the session. The rest of the top six was Fisichella third, Villeneuve fourth, Häkkinen fifth and Coulthard sixth. The Ferraris of Michael Schumacher and Eddie Irvine qualified ninth and tenth respectively.

=== Race ===
At the start Alesi led with Frentzen in second and Coulthard moving from sixth on the grid into third place. The top three stayed this way until lap 28 when Frentzen pitted. On lap 32 Alesi and Coulthard pitted together, when Coulthard moved ahead of Alesi courtesy of a faster pit-stop. This left Mika Häkkinen in the lead until he pitted a couple of laps later. Coulthard took the lead on lap 34 when Michael Schumacher pitted. The top three after Michael Schumacher pitted were Coulthard first, Alesi second and Frentzen third. Häkkinen was fourth until he got a puncture on lap 36. The top six after Häkkinen's puncture were Coulthard first, Alesi second, Frentzen third, Fisichella fourth, Villeneuve fifth and Michael Schumacher in sixth. The top six stayed in that order for the rest of the race, which was won by Coulthard by just under two seconds. This was the only race of the season where neither Jacques Villeneuve nor Michael Schumacher was on the podium.

=== Post-race ===
David Coulthard dedicated his win in this race to Princess Diana, who had been killed in a road accident the week before.

== Classification ==
=== Qualifying ===
| Pos | No | Driver | Constructor | Time | Gap |
|---|---|---|---|---|---|
| 1 | 7 | (France) Jean Alesi | Benetton-Renault | 1:22.990 | |
| 2 | 4 | (Germany) Heinz-Harald Frentzen | Williams-Renault | 1:23.042 | +0.052 |
| 3 | 12 | (Italy) Giancarlo Fisichella | Jordan-Peugeot | 1:23.066 | +0.076 |
| 4 | 3 | (Canada) Jacques Villeneuve | Williams-Renault | 1:23.231 | +0.241 |
| 5 | 9 | (Finland) Mika Häkkinen | McLaren-Mercedes | 1:23.340 | +0.350 |
| 6 | 10 | (United Kingdom) David Coulthard | McLaren-Mercedes | 1:23.347 | +0.357 |
| 7 | 8 | (Austria) Gerhard Berger | Benetton-Renault | 1:23.443 | +0.453 |
| 8 | 11 | (Germany) Ralf Schumacher | Jordan-Peugeot | 1:23.603 | +0.613 |
| 9 | 5 | (Germany) Michael Schumacher | Ferrari | 1:23.624 | +0.634 |
| 10 | 6 | (United Kingdom) Eddie Irvine | Ferrari | 1:23.891 | +0.901 |
| 11 | 22 | (Brazil) Rubens Barrichello | Stewart-Ford | 1:24.177 | +1.187 |
| 12 | 16 | (United Kingdom) Johnny Herbert | Sauber-Petronas | 1:24.242 | +1.252 |
| 13 | 23 | (Denmark) Jan Magnussen | Stewart-Ford | 1:24.394 | +1.404 |
| 14 | 1 | (United Kingdom) Damon Hill | Arrows-Yamaha | 1:24.482 | +1.492 |
| 15 | 15 | (Japan) Shinji Nakano | Prost-Mugen-Honda | 1:24.553 | +1.563 |
| 16 | 14 | (Italy) Jarno Trulli | Prost-Mugen-Honda | 1:24.567 | +1.577 |
| 17 | 2 | (Brazil) Pedro Diniz | Arrows-Yamaha | 1:24.639 | +1.649 |
| 18 | 17 | (Italy) Gianni Morbidelli | Sauber-Petronas | 1:24.735 | +1.745 |
| 19 | 19 | (Finland) Mika Salo | Tyrrell-Ford | 1:25.693 | +2.703 |
| 20 | 18 | (Netherlands) Jos Verstappen | Tyrrell-Ford | 1:25.845 | +2.855 |
| 21 | 20 | (Japan) Ukyo Katayama | Minardi-Hart | 1:26.655 | +3.665 |
| 22 | 21 | (Brazil) Tarso Marques | Minardi-Hart | 1:27.677 | +4.687 |
107% time: 1:28.799

=== Race ===
| Pos | No | Driver | Constructor | Laps | Time/Retired | Grid | Points |
|---|---|---|---|---|---|---|---|
| 1 | 10 | (United Kingdom) David Coulthard | McLaren-Mercedes | 53 | 1:17:04.609 | 6 | 10 |
| 2 | 7 | (France) Jean Alesi | Benetton-Renault | 53 | +1.937 | 1 | 6 |
| 3 | 4 | (Germany) Heinz-Harald Frentzen | Williams-Renault | 53 | +4.343 | 2 | 4 |
| 4 | 12 | (Italy) Giancarlo Fisichella | Jordan-Peugeot | 53 | +5.871 | 3 | 3 |
| 5 | 3 | (Canada) Jacques Villeneuve | Williams-Renault | 53 | +6.416 | 4 | 2 |
| 6 | 5 | (Germany) Michael Schumacher | Ferrari | 53 | +11.481 | 9 | 1 |
| 7 | 8 | (Austria) Gerhard Berger | Benetton-Renault | 53 | +12.471 | 7 | |
| 8 | 6 | (United Kingdom) Eddie Irvine | Ferrari | 53 | +17.639 | 10 | |
| 9 | 9 | (Finland) Mika Häkkinen | McLaren-Mercedes | 53 | +49.373 | 5 | |
| 10 | 14 | (Italy) Jarno Trulli | Prost-Mugen-Honda | 53 | +1:02.706 | 16 | |
| 11 | 15 | (Japan) Shinji Nakano | Prost-Mugen-Honda | 53 | +1:03.327 | 15 | |
| 12 | 17 | (Italy) Gianni Morbidelli | Sauber-Petronas | 52 | +1 lap | 18 | |
| 13 | 22 | (Brazil) Rubens Barrichello | Stewart-Ford | 52 | +1 lap | 11 | |
| 14 | 21 | (Brazil) Tarso Marques | Minardi-Hart | 50 | +3 laps | 22 | |
| Ret | 1 | (United Kingdom) Damon Hill | Arrows-Yamaha | 46 | Engine | 14 | |
| Ret | 11 | (Germany) Ralf Schumacher | Jordan-Peugeot | 39 | Collision | 8 | |
| Ret | 16 | (United Kingdom) Johnny Herbert | Sauber-Petronas | 38 | Collision | 12 | |
| Ret | 19 | (Finland) Mika Salo | Tyrrell-Ford | 33 | Engine | 19 | |
| Ret | 23 | (Denmark) Jan Magnussen | Stewart-Ford | 31 | Transmission | 13 | |
| Ret | 18 | (Netherlands) Jos Verstappen | Tyrrell-Ford | 12 | Gearbox | 20 | |
| Ret | 20 | (Japan) Ukyo Katayama | Minardi-Hart | 8 | Loose wheel | 21 | |
| Ret | 2 | (Brazil) Pedro Diniz | Arrows-Yamaha | 4 | Suspension | 17 | |

== Championship standings after the race ==
- **Bold text** indicates who still has a theoretical chance of becoming World Champion.

Drivers' Championship standings

| Pos | Driver | Points |
|---|---|---|
| 1 | (Germany) **Michael Schumacher** | 67 |
| 2 | (Canada) **Jacques Villeneuve** | 57 |
| 3 | (France) **Jean Alesi** | 28 |
| 4 | (Germany) **Heinz-Harald Frentzen** | 27 |
| 5 | (United Kingdom) David Coulthard | 24 |

Constructors' Championship standings

| Pos | Constructor | Points |
|---|---|---|
| 1 | (Italy) **Ferrari** | 85 |
| 2 | (United Kingdom) **Williams-Renault** | 84 |
| 3 | (Italy) **Benetton-Renault** | 53 |
| 4 | (United Kingdom) **McLaren-Mercedes** | 38 |
| 5 | (Republic of Ireland) **Jordan-Peugeot** | 28 |

- Note: Only the top five positions are included for both sets of standings.

| Previous race: 1997 Belgian Grand Prix | FIA Formula One World Championship; 1997 season | Next race: 1997 Austrian Grand Prix |
| Previous race: 1996 Italian Grand Prix | Italian Grand Prix | Next race: 1998 Italian Grand Prix |
