= 1997 San Marino Grand Prix =

Race 4 of 17 in the 1997 Formula One World Championship
← Previous race	Next race →

Race details
- Date: 27 April 1997
- Official name: XVII Gran Premio di San Marino
- Location: Autodromo Enzo e Dino Ferrari, Imola, Emilia-Romagna, Italy
- Course: Permanent Racing Facility
- Course length: 4.930 km (3.065 miles)
- Distance: 62 laps, 305.660 km (190.030 miles)
- Weather: Cloudy, Dry, 17 °C

Pole position
Driver	(Canada) Jacques Villeneuve	Williams-Renault
- Time: 1:23.303

Fastest lap
Driver	(Germany) Heinz-Harald Frentzen	Williams-Renault
- Time: 1:25.531 on lap 42

Podium
First	(Germany) Heinz-Harald Frentzen	Williams-Renault
Second	(Germany) Michael Schumacher	Ferrari
Third	(United Kingdom) Eddie Irvine	Ferrari

The 1997 San Marino Grand Prix was a Formula One motor race held at Autodromo Enzo e Dino Ferrari, Italy on 27 April 1997. It was the fourth race of the 1997 Formula One season. The 62-lap race was won by Williams driver Heinz-Harald Frentzen after he started from second position. Michael Schumacher finished second for the Ferrari team with his teammate Eddie Irvine third.

== Summary ==
=== Pre-race ===
In the early practice sessions the Ferrari and Benetton teams dominated, with a large majority of the field experiencing some sort of problem with their car, or going off. One of the drivers was David Coulthard, who had a major off in the Saturday morning session, destroying the car. However, the Williams soon regained the top spot in the later sessions.

=== Qualifying ===
Jacques Villeneuve made it four pole positions in a row after once again taking pole. His teammate joined him on the front row, followed by Michael Schumacher, another strong performance by Olivier Panis, and in fifth Michael's younger brother Ralf.

=== Race ===
Jacques Villeneuve driving in the San Marino Grand Prix

Heinz-Harald Frentzen took his maiden Formula One win driving for Williams after he held off a late charge from Michael Schumacher. Jacques Villeneuve retired from third place with a gearbox failure.

Gerhard Berger started his 200th grand prix, however it ended in disappointment when he spun off early on.

== Classification ==
=== Qualifying ===
Pos	No	Driver	Constructor	Time	Gap
1	3	(Canada) Jacques Villeneuve	Williams-Renault	1:23.303	
2	4	(Germany) Heinz-Harald Frentzen	Williams-Renault	1:23.646	+0.343
3	5	(Germany) Michael Schumacher	Ferrari	1:23.955	+0.652
4	14	(France) Olivier Panis	Prost-Mugen-Honda	1:24.075	+0.772
5	11	(Germany) Ralf Schumacher	Jordan-Peugeot	1:24.081	+0.778
6	12	(Italy) Giancarlo Fisichella	Jordan-Peugeot	1:24.596	+1.293
7	16	(United Kingdom) Johnny Herbert	Sauber-Petronas	1:24.723	+1.420
8	9	(Finland) Mika Häkkinen	McLaren-Mercedes	1:24.812	+1.509
9	6	(United Kingdom) Eddie Irvine	Ferrari	1:24.862	+1.558
10	10	(United Kingdom) David Coulthard	McLaren-Mercedes	1:25.077	+1.774
11	8	(Austria) Gerhard Berger	Benetton-Renault	1:25.371	+2.068
12	17	(Italy) Nicola Larini	Sauber-Petronas	1:25.554	+2.241
13	22	(Brazil) Rubens Barrichello	Stewart-Ford	1:25.579	+2.276
14	7	(France) Jean Alesi	Benetton-Renault	1:25.729	+2.426
15	1	(United Kingdom) Damon Hill	Arrows-Yamaha	1:25.743	+2.440
16	23	(Denmark) Jan Magnussen	Stewart-Ford	1:26.192	+2.889
17	2	(Brazil) Pedro Diniz	Arrows-Yamaha	1:26.253	+2.950
18	15	(Japan) Shinji Nakano	Prost-Mugen-Honda	1:26.712	+3.409
19	19	(Finland) Mika Salo	Tyrrell-Ford	1:26.852	+3.549
20	21	(Italy) Jarno Trulli	Minardi-Hart	1:26.960	+3.657
21	18	(Netherlands) Jos Verstappen	Tyrrell-Ford	1:27.428	+4.125
22	20	(Japan) Ukyo Katayama	Minardi-Hart	1:28.727	+5.424
107% time : 1:29.134

=== Race ===
Pos	No	Driver	Constructor	Laps	Time/Retired	Grid	Points
1	4	(Germany) Heinz-Harald Frentzen	Williams-Renault	62	1:31:00.673	2	10
2	5	(Germany) Michael Schumacher	Ferrari	62	+1.237	3	6
3	6	(United Kingdom) Eddie Irvine	Ferrari	62	+1:18.343	9	4
4	12	(Italy) Giancarlo Fisichella	Jordan-Peugeot	62	+1:23.388	6	3
5	7	(France) Jean Alesi	Benetton-Renault	61	+1 lap	14	2
6	9	(Finland) Mika Häkkinen	McLaren-Mercedes	61	+1 lap	8	1
7	17	(Italy) Nicola Larini	Sauber-Petronas	61	+1 lap	12	
8	14	(France) Olivier Panis	Prost-Mugen-Honda	61	+1 lap	4	
9	19	(Finland) Mika Salo	Tyrrell-Ford	60	+2 laps	19	
10	18	(Netherlands) Jos Verstappen	Tyrrell-Ford	60	+2 laps	21	
11	20	(Japan) Ukyo Katayama	Minardi-Hart	59	+3 laps	22	
Ret	2	(Brazil) Pedro Diniz	Arrows-Yamaha	53	Gearbox	17	
Ret	3	(Canada) Jacques Villeneuve	Williams-Renault	40	Gearbox	1	
Ret	10	(United Kingdom) David Coulthard	McLaren-Mercedes	38	Engine	10	
Ret	22	(Brazil) Rubens Barrichello	Stewart-Ford	32	Engine	13	
Ret	16	(United Kingdom) Johnny Herbert	Sauber-Petronas	18	Electrical	7	
Ret	11	(Germany) Ralf Schumacher	Jordan-Peugeot	17	Transmission	5	
Ret	15	(Japan) Shinji Nakano	Prost-Mugen-Honda	11	Collision	18	
Ret	1	(United Kingdom) Damon Hill	Arrows-Yamaha	11	Collision	15	
Ret	8	(Austria) Gerhard Berger	Benetton-Renault	4	Spun off	11	
Ret	23	(Denmark) Jan Magnussen	Stewart-Ford	2	Spun off	16	
DNS	21	(Italy) Jarno Trulli	Minardi-Hart	0	Gearbox	20	

== Championship standings after the race ==
Drivers' Championship standings

Pos	Driver	Points
1	(Canada) Jacques Villeneuve	20
2	(Germany) Michael Schumacher	14
3	(Germany) Heinz-Harald Frentzen	10
4	(United Kingdom) David Coulthard	10
5	(United Kingdom) Eddie Irvine	10

Constructors' Championship standings

Pos	Constructor	Points
1	(United Kingdom) Williams-Renault	30
2	(Italy) Ferrari	24
3	(United Kingdom) McLaren-Mercedes	20
4	(Italy) Benetton-Renault	13
5	(Republic of Ireland) Jordan-Peugeot	7

- Note: Only the top five positions are included for both sets of standings.

Previous race: 1997 Argentine Grand Prix	FIA Formula One World Championship; 1997 season	Next race: 1997 Monaco Grand Prix
Previous race: 1996 San Marino Grand Prix	San Marino Grand Prix	Next race: 1998 San Marino Grand Prix
