= Tarso Marques =

Brazilian racing driver (born 1976)

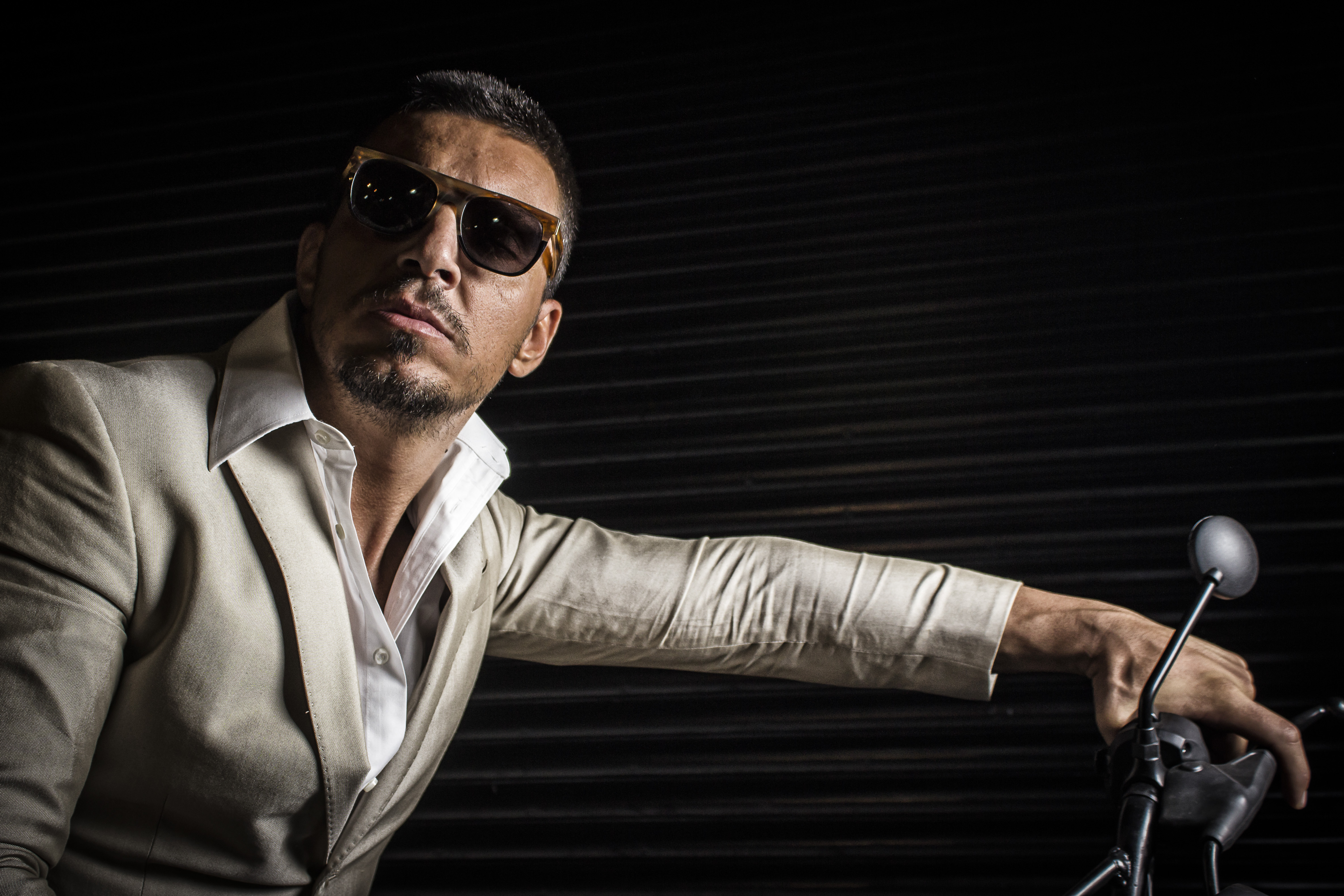
- Marques in 2014
- Born: Tarso Anibal Santanna Marques; 19 January 1976 (age 50); Curitiba, Brazil

Formula One World Championship career
- Nationality: (Brazil) Brazilian
- Active years: 1996–1997, 2001
- Team: Minardi
- Entries: 26 (24 starts)
- Championships: 0
- Wins: 0
- Podiums: 0
- Career points: 0
- Pole positions: 0
- Fastest laps: 0
- First entry: 1996 Brazilian Grand Prix
- Last entry: 2001 Belgian Grand Prix

Championship titles
- 1992: Formula Chevrolet

Tarso Anibal Santanna Marques (born 19 January 1976) is a Brazilian racing driver and vehicle customizer. He participated in 24 Formula One Grands Prix, all driving for the Minardi team, but scored no championship points in three separate seasons and never completed a full season in the sport.

== Racing career ==
=== Open wheel racing ===
After five years of karting, Marques raced in Formula Chevrolet in his home country aged only 16, and he won the title at his first attempt. In 1993, he moved up to Formula Three Sudamericana and subsequently International Formula 3000 and became the youngest driver to win races at both levels. In 1996, he started racing for Minardi in Formula One, competing with various drivers for the seat over the following two years, including Giancarlo Fisichella, Jarno Trulli and Pedro Lamy. Minardi's financial situation demanded that drivers with strong sponsorship were generally favoured, and there were several driver changes in the team at that time.

In 1999, Marques moved stateside to drive in the American Champ Car ranks, and caught the eye of legendary team-owner Roger Penske. When two-time Indianapolis 500 winner Al Unser Jr. was injured, Penske asked him to fill in. His best finish was ninth. In 2000, 2004, and 2005, he drove sporadically in that series for perennial minnows Dale Coyne Racing, with a best result of 11th.

Marques returned to Formula One in 2001 to race alongside future double World Champion Fernando Alonso in the Minardi team, newly purchased by Paul Stoddart. He finished the season ahead of the Spaniard but it was a difficult season for Marques, with the team's financial difficulties not always allowing equal equipment for both drivers. Marques brought no money to the team and was employed under the provision that another driver with more sponsorship money could replace him at any point in the season, and that prospect was realised towards the end of the year, when Minardi replaced Marques with Alex Yoong with three races remaining. Marques welcomed the driver change as the extra finance would enable the team to progress, adding, "Yoong brought the sponsor for the team already two or three races ago so he should be in the car." His two ninth-place finishes remained Minardi's best results of the season, but he was nearly always outpaced by Alonso. Marques would however remain at Minardi for 2002 as the test and reserve driver. Despite this, he did not replace Yoong later in the season when the Malaysian was dropped, with the seat instead going to Anthony Davidson, and Justin Wilson also being offered the drive ahead of Marques.

Since his last Champ Car outing in 2005, Marques has returned to South America to drive in the TC2000 and Stock Car Brasil touring car championships.

=== Stock car racing ===
In March 2022, it was announced that Marques would compete in the NASCAR Cup Series, driving the No. 79 Ford Mustang for Team Stange Racing on a part-time basis. His Cup Series debut, which was going to be in the race at Road America, had to be delayed as NASCAR would not approve him to make a Cup Series start without any prior experience in a stock car. As a result, TSR announced that they would field an entry for Marques in the NASCAR Xfinity Series race at the Indianapolis Road Course in order for him to be approved to race in the Cup Series, and his first Cup Series start would now be in the race at Watkins Glen. The team and Marques did not show up for the race weekend. Nothing has been heard from the team since then, and they ended up not running at all in 2022.

== Post-racing activities ==
=== Television ===
In 2012, Marques participated in the first edition of the reality show Amazônia, on Rede Record.

In 2013, Marques became a contributor to the Auto Esporte program on TV Globo, covering topics related to vehicle customization.

In 2015, Marques debuted on the "Lata Velha" segment of TV Globo's Caldeirão do Huck, customizing a low-displacement motorcycle for the first time. The segment became part of the program's schedule, with Tarso Marques responsible for the vehicle transformations. Further he made TMC Custom Design Motorcycles, at Vila Olympia autoshop, including in 2018 the Dumont, a 300 hp V6 engine mounted on a structure between wheels without center hub.

=== Legal issues ===
Marques was arrested in São Paulo in the early hours of August 31, 2025, for alleged illegal possession of a Lamborghini Gallardo without license plates. After being stopped by police, Marques tried to attach the plates and said it was a demonstrator show car. He was nevertheless arrested along with two women who were with him. Charges included the alleged handling of a vehicle connected to judicial restrictions, which had overdue licensing since 2013 and carried R$ 1.3 million in IPVA debts. The vehicle belonged to a company which had been convicted of a pyramid scheme. Marques was released on bail after the R$ 22,700 bail bond was paid.

== Racing record ==
=== Complete International Formula 3000 results ===
(key) (Races in bold indicate pole position) (Races in italics indicate fastest lap)

Year	Entrant	1	2	3	4	5	6	7	8	DC	Points
1994	Vortex Motorsport	SIL; 13	PAU; Ret	CAT; DNS	PER; 12	HOC; 10	SPA; 8	EST; 12	MAG; 4	12th	3
1995	DAMS	SIL; 12	CAT; 3	**PAU**; Ret	PER; Ret	HOC; Ret	SPA; 5	**EST**; 1	MAG; Ret	5th	15

=== Complete Formula One results ===
(key)

Year	Entrant	Chassis	Engine	1	2	3	4	5	6	7	8	9	10	11	12	13	14	15	16	17	WDC	Points
1996	Minardi Team	Minardi M195B	Ford V8	AUS	BRA; Ret	ARG; Ret	EUR	SMR	MON	ESP	CAN	FRA	GBR	GER	HUN	BEL	ITA	POR	JPN		NC	0
1997	Minardi Team	Minardi M197	Hart V8	AUS	BRA	ARG	SMR	MON	ESP	CAN	FRA; Ret	GBR; 10	GER; Ret	HUN; 12	BEL; Ret	ITA; 14	AUT; EX	LUX; Ret	JPN; Ret	EUR; 15	25th	0
2001	European Minardi F1	Minardi PS01	European V10	AUS; Ret	MAL; 14	BRA; 9	SMR; Ret	ESP; 16	AUT; Ret	MON; Ret	CAN; 9	EUR; Ret	FRA; 15	GBR; DNQ	GER; Ret						22nd	0
2001	European Minardi F1	Minardi PS01B	European V10													HUN; Ret	BEL; 13	ITA	USA	JPN	22nd	0

=== American open-wheel racing ===
(key)

==== CART/Champ Car ====
Year	Team	No.	Chassis	Engine	1	2	3	4	5	6	7	8	9	10	11	12	13	14	15	16	17	18	19	20	Rank	Points	Ref
1999	Team Penske	2	Penske PC-27	Mercedes-Benz IC108E V8t	MIA	MOT; 14	LBH; 25	NAZ																	27th	**4**	
1999	Team Penske	3	Penske PC-27	Mercedes-Benz IC108E V8t					RIO; 9	GAT; 26	MIL	POR; 18													27th	**4**	
1999	Team Penske	3	Lola B99/00	Mercedes-Benz IC108E V8t									CLE; 24	ROA	TOR	MIC	DET	MDO	CHI	VAN	LAG	HOU	SRF	FON	27th	**4**	
2000	Dale Coyne Racing	34	Swift 011.c	Ford XF V8t	MIA	LBH	RIO	MOT; 17	NAZ; 12	MIL; 20	DET; 10	POR; 15	CLE; 24	TOR; 21	MIC; 12	CHI; 18	MDO; 18	ROA; 23	VAN; 22	LS; 18	GAT; 15	HOU; 17	SRF; 13	FON; 7	25th	**11**	
2004	Dale Coyne Racing	19	Lola B02/00	Ford XFE V8t	LBH; 18	MTY; 18	MIL	POR	CLE	TOR	VAN	ROA	DEN	MTL	LS	LVS	SRF	MXC; 18							22nd	**9**^{^}	
2005	Dale Coyne Racing	19	Lola B02/00	Ford XFE V8t	LBH	MTY	MIL	POR	CLE; 11	TOR	EDM	SJO	DEN	MTL	LVS	SRF	MXC								24th	**10**	

^{^} New points system implemented in 2004.

=== Complete Stock Car Brasil results ===
Year	Team	Car	1	2	3	4	5	6	7	8	9	10	11	12	13	14	15	16	17	18	19	20	21	Rank	Points
2006	Terra-Avallone	Mitsubishi Lancer	INT; Ret	CUR	MOU	INT	LON	CUR; Ret	SCZ; DNS	BRA; Ret	TAR; Ret	ARG; 11	RIO; 1	INT; Ret										21st	30
2007	Terra-Avallone	Mitsubishi Lancer	INT; Ret	CUR; Ret	**MOU**; 1	INT; Ret	LON; Ret	SCZ; Ret	CUR; DNQ	BRA; 21	ARG; 26	TAR; 19	RIO; 13	INT; 21										24th	28
2008	Sky-Action Power	Peugeot 307	INT; Ret	BRA; Ret	CUR; Ret	SCZ; 10	MOU; Ret	INT; 29	RIO; 24	LON; Ret	CUR; 11	BRA; Ret	TAR; 23	INT; 7										27th	20
2009	Dolly-Action Power	Chevrolet Vectra	INT	CUR	BRA; Ret	SCZ; 18	INT	SAL	RIO	MOU	CUR; 18	BRA; Ret	TAR; DSQ	INT; Ret										31st	0
2010	Gramacho Competições	Chevrolet Vectra	INT	CUR; Ret	VEL; Ret	RIO; 17	RBP; 24	SAL	INT	MOU	LON	SCZ	BRA	CUR										36th	0
2011	Amir Nasr Racing	Peugeot 408	CUR	INT	RBP	VEL	MOU	RIO	INT; Ret	SAL	SCZ	LON	BRA	VEL										NC†	0†
2016	Mico's Racing	Peugeot 408	CUR; 1; 19	VEL; 1	VEL; 2	GOI; 1	GOI; 2	SCZ; 1	SCZ; 2	TAR; 1	TAR; 2	CAS; 1	CAS; 2	INT; 1	LON; 1	LON; 2	CUR; 1	CUR; 2	GOI; 1	GOI; 2	CRI; 1	CRI; 2	INT; 1	NC†	0†
2018	Mico's Racing	Chevrolet Cruze	INT; 1; 22	CUR; 1	CUR; 2	VEL; 1	VEL; 2	LON; 1	LON; 2	SCZ; 1	SCZ; 2	GOI; 1	MOU; 1	MOU; 2	CAS; 1	CAS; 2	VCA; 1	VCA; 2	TAR; 1	TAR; 2	GOI; 1	GOI; 2	INT; 1	NC	0

^{†} As Marques was a guest driver, he was ineligible for points.
