= 1997 British Grand Prix =

Race 9 of 17 in the 1997 Formula One World Championship
← Previous race	Next race →
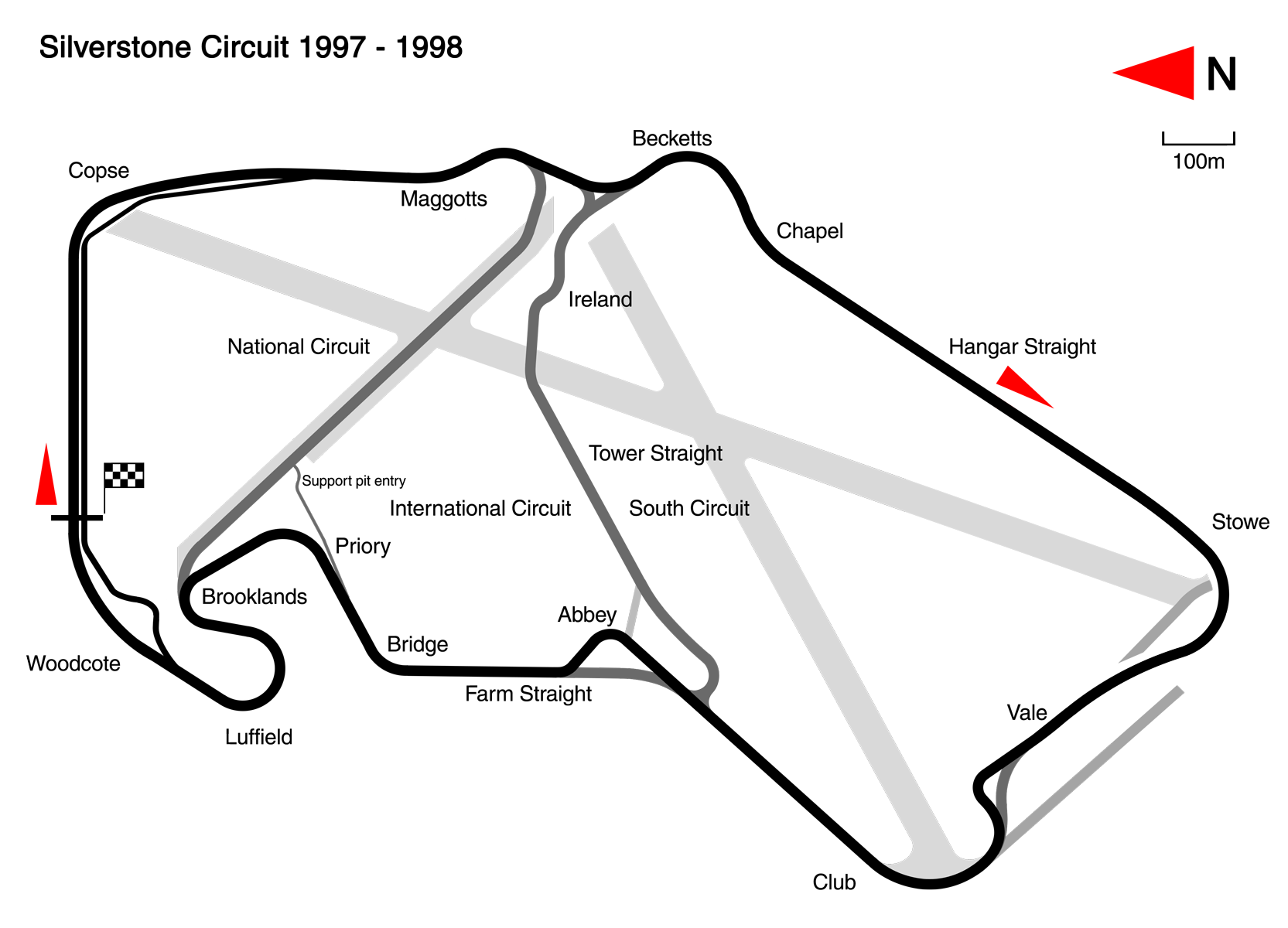
- Silverstone Circuit in its 1997 configuration

Race details
- Date: 13 July 1997
- Official name: L RAC British Grand Prix
- Location: Silverstone Circuit, Silverstone, Northamptonshire and Buckinghamshire, England
- Course: Permanent racing facility
- Course length: 5.140 km (3.194 miles)
- Distance: 59 laps, 303.260 km (188.437 miles)
- Scheduled distance: 60 laps, 308.400 km (191.631 miles)
- Weather: Sunny, Dry Track

Pole position
Driver	(Canada) Jacques Villeneuve	Williams-Renault
- Time: 1:21.598

Fastest lap
Driver	(Germany) Michael Schumacher	Ferrari
- Time: 1:24.480 on lap 34

Podium
First	(Canada) Jacques Villeneuve	Williams-Renault
Second	(France) Jean Alesi	Benetton-Renault
Third	(Austria) Alexander Wurz	Benetton-Renault

The 1997 British Grand Prix was a Formula One motor race held at Silverstone on 13 July 1997. It was the ninth round of the 1997 Formula One World Championship. Williams' Jacques Villeneuve won the race despite being stuck in the pit lane for half a minute during his first stop due to a wheel nut problem.

Two previous leaders retired from the race due to mechanical failures. Michael Schumacher led by over 40 seconds before a wheel bearing failure caused retirement. Mika Häkkinen seemed set for his first win but his engine blew while he was holding off Villeneuve, having made one stop to the Canadian's two. Further back, Alexander Wurz scored his first podium finish in his third Grand Prix, also briefly leading the race during the pitstops. David Coulthard ran 3rd early on, but faded with braking problems. Schumacher's teammate Eddie Irvine was close behind Villeneuve when both made their second stop, but his car failed as he exited the pits. Defending champion Damon Hill finally scored his first points for Arrows after a late retirement for Shinji Nakano.

Heinz-Harald Frentzen had a disastrous run: he stalled on the grid with the race about to begin, forcing the race start to be aborted and making him start from the back of the grid. Then, on the first lap, Jos Verstappen crashed into the back of his Williams car at Becketts, ending the German's race immediately.

This race marked the 100th Grand Prix victory for the Williams team, who garnered considerable media attention throughout the weekend with the "Ro?" branding on their cars.

== Pre-race ==
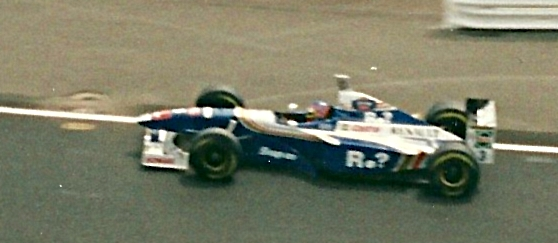
The race was won by Jacques Villeneuve in the "Ro?" Williams FW19

The struggles of Sauber to find a suitable teammate for Johnny Herbert in 1997 continued as Peter Sauber's attempts to replace Norberto Fontana for the Silverstone round ultimately failed as Martin Brundle declined a one-off drive, opting to commentate on the race instead. Fontana kept his seat and finished 9th.

== Classification ==
=== Qualifying ===
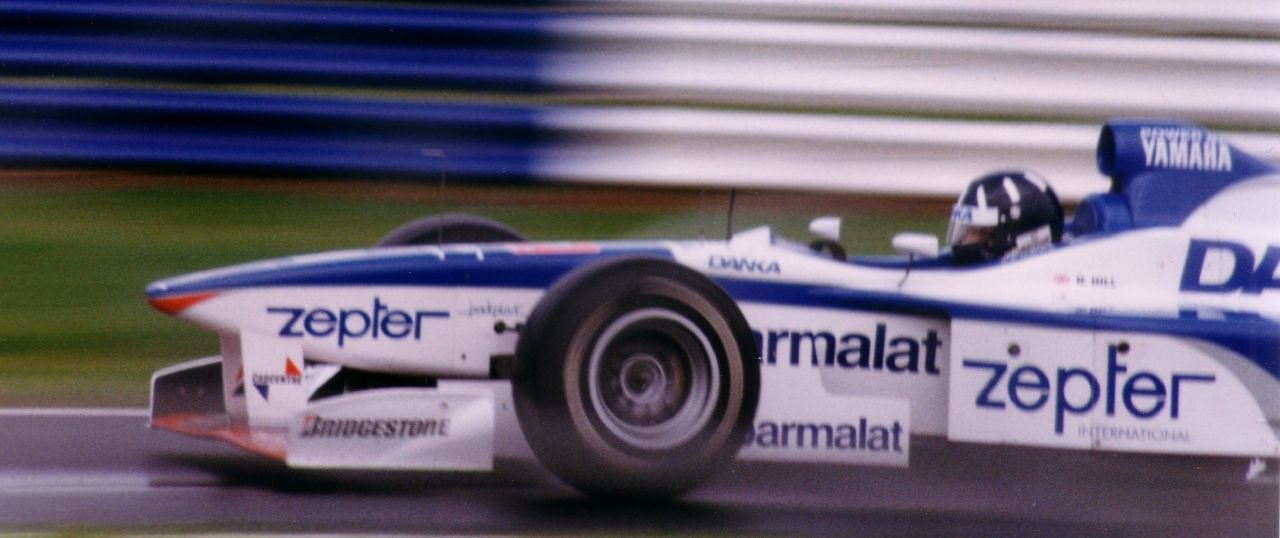
Damon Hill during the race

Pos	No	Driver	Constructor	Time	Gap	Grid
1	3	(Canada) Jacques Villeneuve	Williams-Renault	1:21.598		1
2	4	(Germany) Heinz-Harald Frentzen	Williams-Renault	1:21.732	+0.134	2
3	9	(Finland) Mika Häkkinen	McLaren-Mercedes	1:21.797	+0.199	3
4	5	(Germany) Michael Schumacher	Ferrari	1:21.977	+0.379	4
5	11	(Germany) Ralf Schumacher	Jordan-Peugeot	1:22.277	+0.679	5
6	10	(United Kingdom) David Coulthard	McLaren-Mercedes	1:22.279	+0.681	6
7	6	(United Kingdom) Eddie Irvine	Ferrari	1:22.342	+0.744	7
8	8	(Austria) Alexander Wurz	Benetton-Renault	1:22.344	+0.746	8
9	16	(United Kingdom) Johnny Herbert	Sauber-Petronas	1:22.368	+0.770	9
10	12	(Italy) Giancarlo Fisichella	Jordan-Peugeot	1:22.371	+0.773	10
11	7	(France) Jean Alesi	Benetton-Renault	1:22.392	+0.794	11
12	1	(United Kingdom) Damon Hill	Arrows-Yamaha	1:23.271	+1.673	12
13	14	(Italy) Jarno Trulli	Prost-Mugen-Honda	1:23.366	+1.768	13
14	17	(Argentina) Norberto Fontana	Sauber-Petronas	1:23.790	+2.192	22 ^{1}
15	15	(Japan) Shinji Nakano	Prost-Mugen-Honda	1:23.887	+2.289	14
16	23	(Denmark) Jan Magnussen	Stewart-Ford	1:24.067	+2.469	15
17	2	(Brazil) Pedro Diniz	Arrows-Yamaha	1:24.239	+2.641	16
18	19	(Finland) Mika Salo	Tyrrell-Ford	1:24.478	+2.880	17
19	20	(Japan) Ukyo Katayama	Minardi-Hart	1:24.553	+2.955	18
20	18	(Netherlands) Jos Verstappen	Tyrrell-Ford	1:25.010	+3.412	19
21	21	(Brazil) Tarso Marques	Minardi-Hart	1:25.154	+3.556	20
22	22	(Brazil) Rubens Barrichello	Stewart-Ford	1:25.525	+3.927	21
107% time: 1:27.310

Notes

- ^1 – Norberto Fontana was relegated to the back of the grid.

=== Race ===
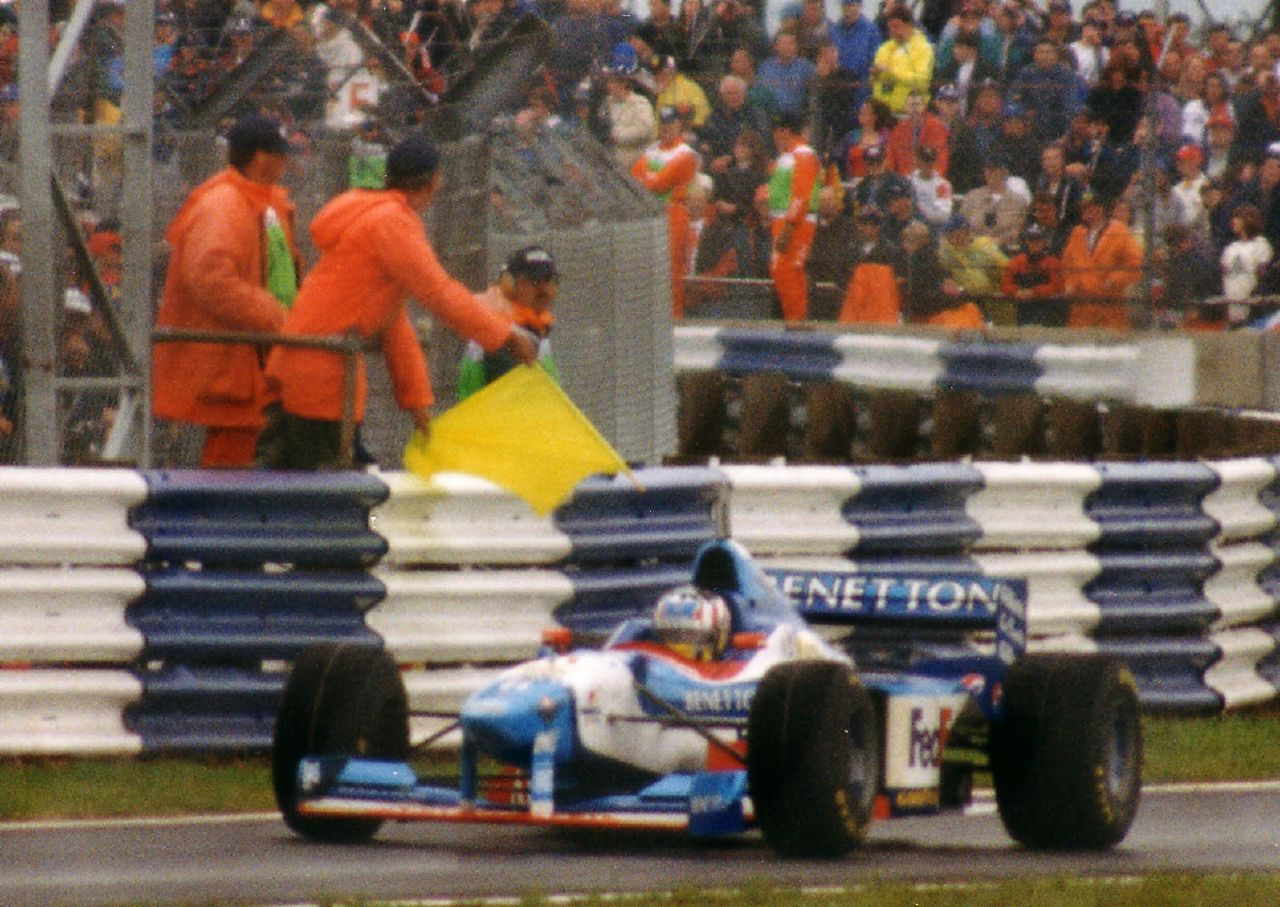
Alexander Wurz passes a yellow flag

Pos	No	Driver	Constructor	Laps	Time/Retired	Grid	Points
1	3	(Canada) Jacques Villeneuve	Williams-Renault	59	1:28:01.665	1	10
2	7	(France) Jean Alesi	Benetton-Renault	59	+10.205	11	6
3	8	(Austria) Alexander Wurz	Benetton-Renault	59	+11.296	8	4
4	10	(United Kingdom) David Coulthard	McLaren-Mercedes	59	+31.229	6	3
5	11	(Germany) Ralf Schumacher	Jordan-Peugeot	59	+31.880	5	2
6	1	(United Kingdom) Damon Hill	Arrows-Yamaha	59	+1:13.552	12	1
7	12	(Italy) Giancarlo Fisichella	Jordan-Peugeot	58	+1 lap	10	
8	14	(Italy) Jarno Trulli	Prost-Mugen-Honda	58	+1 lap	13	
9	17	(Argentina) Norberto Fontana	Sauber-Petronas	58	+1 lap	22	
10	21	(Brazil) Tarso Marques	Minardi-Hart	58	+1 lap	20	
11	15	(Japan) Shinji Nakano	Prost-Mugen-Honda	57	Engine	14	
Ret	9	(Finland) Mika Häkkinen	McLaren-Mercedes	52	Engine	3	
Ret	23	(Denmark) Jan Magnussen	Stewart-Ford	50	Engine	15	
Ret	18	(Netherlands) Jos Verstappen	Tyrrell-Ford	45	Engine	19	
Ret	6	(United Kingdom) Eddie Irvine	Ferrari	44	Halfshaft	7	
Ret	19	(Finland) Mika Salo	Tyrrell-Ford	44	Engine	17	
Ret	16	(United Kingdom) Johnny Herbert	Sauber-Petronas	42	Electrical	9	
Ret	5	(Germany) Michael Schumacher	Ferrari	38	Wheel bearing	4	
Ret	22	(Brazil) Rubens Barrichello	Stewart-Ford	37	Engine	21	
Ret	2	(Brazil) Pedro Diniz	Arrows-Yamaha	29	Engine	16	
Ret	4	(Germany) Heinz-Harald Frentzen	Williams-Renault	0	Collision	2	
Ret	20	(Japan) Ukyo Katayama	Minardi-Hart	0	Accident/spun off	18	

== Championship standings after the race ==
Drivers' Championship standings

Pos	Driver	Points
1	(Germany) Michael Schumacher	47
2	(Canada) Jacques Villeneuve	43
3	(France) Jean Alesi	21
4	(Germany) Heinz-Harald Frentzen	19
5	(United Kingdom) Eddie Irvine	18

Constructors' Championship standings

Pos	Constructor	Points
1	(Italy) Ferrari	65
2	(United Kingdom) Williams-Renault	62
3	(Italy) Benetton-Renault	35
4	(United Kingdom) McLaren-Mercedes	24
5	(France) Prost-Mugen-Honda	16

- Note: Only the top five positions are included for both sets of standings.

Previous race: 1997 French Grand Prix	FIA Formula One World Championship; 1997 season	Next race: 1997 German Grand Prix
Previous race: 1996 British Grand Prix	British Grand Prix	Next race: 1998 British Grand Prix
