= 1997 Japanese Grand Prix =

Race 16 of 17 in the 1997 Formula One World Championship
← Previous race	Next race →

Race details
- Date: 12 October 1997
- Official name: XXIII Fuji Television Japanese Grand Prix
- Location: Suzuka Circuit, Suzuka, Mie, Japan
- Course: Permanent racing facility
- Course length: 5.860 km (3.641 miles)
- Distance: 53 laps, 310.596 km (192.995 miles)
- Weather: Sunny
- Attendance: 317,000

Pole position
Driver	(Canada) Jacques Villeneuve	Williams-Renault
- Time: 1:36.071

Fastest lap
Driver	(Germany) Heinz-Harald Frentzen	Williams-Renault
- Time: 1:38.942 on lap 48

Podium
First	(Germany) Michael Schumacher	Ferrari
Second	(Germany) Heinz-Harald Frentzen	Williams-Renault
Third	(United Kingdom) Eddie Irvine	Ferrari

The 1997 Japanese Grand Prix (officially known as the XXIII Fuji Television Japanese Grand Prix) was a Formula One motor race held on 12 October 1997 at the Suzuka Circuit, Suzuka. It was the 16th and penultimate race of the 1997 Formula One season. The 53-lap race was won by Michael Schumacher for the Ferrari team after starting from second position. Heinz-Harald Frentzen finished second in a Williams, and Eddie Irvine third in the other Ferrari. Irvine led much of the race before moving over to assist Schumacher's championship battle by blocking Drivers' Championship leader Jacques Villeneuve.

Villeneuve started on pole position in a Williams car. Before the race, it emerged that Villeneuve had been put to the back of the grid, for having ignored waved yellow flags on two consecutive laps during a practice session for the race. Williams appealed and Villeneuve started from the pole. He drove a conservative race to finish 5th, gaining two points. After the race, Williams withdrew their appeal, meaning he lost the two points he originally earned. Schumacher's win put him in front of Villeneuve in the championship on 78 points, with Villeneuve on 77 points. However, as a result of Frentzen finishing second, Williams clinched the Constructors' Championship as Ferrari could not pass their points total with only one race remaining. This race was the last for Gianni Morbidelli. It was also the last time that two German Formula One drivers finished first and second until the 1999 Italian Grand Prix.

== Report ==
=== Practice and qualifying ===
For each race in the 1997 Formula One season there were four practice sessions; two sessions on Friday and two sessions on Saturday morning. The practice sessions on Friday lasted an hour and the practice sessions on Saturday lasted 45 minutes.

"I clearly saw the yellow flag. If they had been waved in a corner, I would have slowed down. But on a straight it was not necessary."

— Jacques Villeneuve, commenting on not slowing down under a yellow flag zone during the first Saturday practice session.

In the first practice session on Saturday morning, an incident occurred 30 minutes into the session. Jos Verstappen in a Tyrrell car pulled over to the side of the track with a fuel pick-up problem. The track marshals as a result waved yellow flags meaning that drivers must slow down at that part of the track. Despite the yellow flags, nine drivers, including Michael Schumacher and Jacques Villeneuve, never slowed down. Villeneuve in the process, set his fastest time of the session on that lap.

Villeneuve set pole position with a time of 1:36.071, half a tenth faster than Schumacher, who was second in the Ferrari setting a time of 1:36.133. Schumacher's team-mate, Eddie Irvine, qualified third, four-tenths behind Villeneuve. McLaren driver Mika Häkkinen rounded out the top four, only three thousands of a second behind Irvine. The Benetton drivers were fifth and seventh; Gerhard Berger ahead of Jean Alesi. Heinz-Harald Frentzen in a Williams split the two in sixth, six-tenths behind Villeneuve.

On the Thursday before practice, the local driver Ukyo Katayama announced his retirement from the category after the next race.

== Classification ==
=== Qualifying ===
Pos	No	Driver	Constructor	Time	Gap
1	3	(Canada) Jacques Villeneuve	Williams-Renault	1:36.071	
2	5	(Germany) Michael Schumacher	Ferrari	1:36.133	+0.062
3	6	(United Kingdom) Eddie Irvine	Ferrari	1:36.466	+0.395
4	9	(Finland) Mika Häkkinen	McLaren-Mercedes	1:36.469	+0.398
5	8	(Austria) Gerhard Berger	Benetton-Renault	1:36.561	+0.490
6	4	(Germany) Heinz-Harald Frentzen	Williams-Renault	1:36.628	+0.557
7	7	(France) Jean Alesi	Benetton-Renault	1:36.682	+0.611
8	16	(United Kingdom) Johnny Herbert	Sauber-Petronas	1:36.906	+0.835
9	12	(Italy) Giancarlo Fisichella	Jordan-Peugeot	1:36.917	+0.846
10	14	(France) Olivier Panis	Prost-Mugen-Honda	1:37.073	+1.002
11	10	(United Kingdom) David Coulthard	McLaren-Mercedes	1:37.095	+1.024
12	22	(Brazil) Rubens Barrichello	Stewart-Ford	1:37.343	+1.272
13	11	(Germany) Ralf Schumacher	Jordan-Peugeot	1:37.443	+1.372
14	23	(Denmark) Jan Magnussen	Stewart-Ford	1:37.480	+1.409
15	15	(Japan) Shinji Nakano	Prost-Mugen-Honda	1:37.588	+1.517
16	2	(Brazil) Pedro Diniz	Arrows-Yamaha	1:37.853	+1.782
17	1	(United Kingdom) Damon Hill	Arrows-Yamaha	1:38.022	+1.951
18	17	(Italy) Gianni Morbidelli	Sauber-Petronas	1:38.556	+2.485
19	20	(Japan) Ukyo Katayama	Minardi-Hart	1:38.983	+2.912
20	21	(Brazil) Tarso Marques	Minardi-Hart	1:39.678	+3.607
21	18	(Netherlands) Jos Verstappen	Tyrrell-Ford	1:40.259	+4.188
22	19	(Finland) Mika Salo	Tyrrell-Ford	1:40.529	+4.458
107% time: 1:42.796

=== Race ===
At the start, Jacques Villeneuve dived to the right and blocked Michael Schumacher, keeping the lead. Behind the frontrunners, Mika Hakkinen passed Eddie Irvine for third. At the final of the first lap, the order was Villeneuve, Michael Schumacher, Hakkinen, Irvine, Frentzen and Berger. Running light on fuel, Irvine started an aggressive climbing of the grid, storming to the lead on lap 3. By lap 5, the Northern Irishman had built a gap of 8.9 seconds from Villeneuve, meanwhile the difference from the Canadian, in 2nd place, to Jean Alesi, in 6th, was less than two seconds. The first casualties were the Stewart duo, retiring with three laps of difference apart. Local heroes Ukyo Katayama and Shinji Nakano soon followed them.

After 13 laps, the drivers started to pit, as did Hakkinen and Berger. At the end of lap 15 Irvine pitted for the lead, 12.7 seconds from Villeneuve in 2nd place. The top-6 were formed then by Michael Schumacher, Frentzen, Johnny Herbert and Giancarlo Fisichella. Schumacher pitted just after his teammate and Villeneuve did the same at the end of lap 19. The Canadian exited the pits just in front of Schumacher, however, with warmer tires, the German stormed to the main straight, dived inside and passed Villeneuve for good. On lap 23, after all the frontrunners had pitted, the order was Irvine, Schumacher, Villeneuve, Frentzen, Hakkinen and Alesi.

The gap from the leader to the second was about 11 seconds on lap 22, but as part of Ferrari's strategy, Irvine soon started to lift his foot and in a couple of laps let Schumacher passed by him to the lead, immediately blocking and holding Villeneuve in third place. The strategy worked perfectly and Villeneuve anticipated his second pit to try to leave the traffic and undercut Irvine. This meant nothing to the Canadian, as he fell down to 6th place and never had the pace to challenge even a podium. After the second round of pits, the major change was in second place, as Frentzen, running heavier on fuel and spending more time on track, passed Irvine for 2nd place. By lap 38 the order was Schumacher, Frentzen (8.5 seconds behind), Irvine, Alesi, Hakkinen and Villeneuve (23 seconds from the leader).

Frentzen eventually charged back and reduced the gap to 5 seconds by lap 45, meanwhile Villeneuve passed Alesi for 5th. The scenario was showing a comfortable leading and eventual winning for Schumacher with 8 laps to go; however, with two laps remaining, the German stuck behind Damon Hill, who was about to be lapped. This meant the gap from him to Frentzen to reduce to one second on final stages, but Schumacher cleaned his way and keep the lead until the chequered flag. As Villeneuve had ended in 5th place, the Canadian initially secured the Championship lead by one point. With his disqualification from the race, he lost two points and the Championship lead to Schumacher, also by one point and one round to go.

Pos	No	Driver	Constructor	Laps	Time/Retired	Grid	Points
1	5	(Germany) Michael Schumacher	Ferrari	53	1:29:48.446	2	10
2	4	(Germany) Heinz-Harald Frentzen	Williams-Renault	53	+1.378	6	6
3	6	(United Kingdom) Eddie Irvine	Ferrari	53	+26.384	3	4
4	9	(Finland) Mika Häkkinen	McLaren-Mercedes	53	+27.129	4	3
5	7	(France) Jean Alesi	Benetton-Renault	53	+40.403	7	2
6	16	(United Kingdom) Johnny Herbert	Sauber-Petronas	53	+41.630	8	1
7	12	(Italy) Giancarlo Fisichella	Jordan-Peugeot	53	+56.825	9	
8	8	(Austria) Gerhard Berger	Benetton-Renault	53	+1:00.429	5	
9	11	(Germany) Ralf Schumacher	Jordan-Peugeot	53	+1:22.036	13	
10	10	(United Kingdom) David Coulthard	McLaren-Mercedes	52	Engine	11	
11	1	(United Kingdom) Damon Hill	Arrows-Yamaha	52	+1 lap	17	
12	2	(Brazil) Pedro Diniz	Arrows-Yamaha	52	+1 lap	16	
13	18	(Netherlands) Jos Verstappen	Tyrrell-Ford	52	+1 lap	21	
Ret	21	(Brazil) Tarso Marques	Minardi-Hart	46	Gearbox	20	
Ret	19	(Finland) Mika Salo	Tyrrell-Ford	46	Engine	22	
Ret	14	(France) Olivier Panis	Prost-Mugen-Honda	36	Engine	10	
Ret	15	(Japan) Shinji Nakano	Prost-Mugen-Honda	22	Wheel bearing	15	
Ret	20	(Japan) Ukyo Katayama	Minardi-Hart	8	Engine	19	
Ret	22	(Brazil) Rubens Barrichello	Stewart-Ford	6	Spun off	12	
Ret	23	(Denmark) Jan Magnussen	Stewart-Ford	3	Spun off	14	
DSQ	3	(Canada) Jacques Villeneuve	Williams-Renault	53	Ignored yellow flags during practice	1	
DNS	17	(Italy) Gianni Morbidelli	Sauber-Petronas	0	Injury	18	

== Championship standings after the race ==
Note, only the top five positions are included for both sets of standings.

Drivers' Championship standings

Pos	Driver	Points
1	(Germany) Michael Schumacher	78
2	(Canada) Jacques Villeneuve	77
3	(Germany) Heinz-Harald Frentzen	41
4	(France) Jean Alesi	36
5	(United Kingdom) David Coulthard	30

Constructors' Championship standings

Pos	Constructor	Points
1	(United Kingdom) Williams-Renault	118
2	(Italy) Ferrari	100
3	(Italy) Benetton-Renault	64
4	(United Kingdom) McLaren-Mercedes	47
5	(Republic of Ireland) Jordan-Peugeot	33

Previous race: 1997 Luxembourg Grand Prix	FIA Formula One World Championship; 1997 season	Next race: 1997 European Grand Prix
Previous race: 1996 Japanese Grand Prix	Japanese Grand Prix	Next race: 1998 Japanese Grand Prix
