= Luxembourg Grand Prix =

Formula 1 Grand Prix

- Nürburgring (Germany)

Race information
- Number of times held: 6
- First held: 1949
- Last held: 1998
- Most wins (drivers): No repeat winners
- Most wins (constructors): (United Kingdom) Cooper (2) (Italy) Ferrari (2)
- Circuit length: 4.556 km (2.83 miles)
- Race length: 305.252 km (189.66 miles)
- Laps: 67

Last race (1998)

Pole position
- (Germany) Michael Schumacher; Ferrari; 1:18.561

Podium
- 1. (Finland) M. Häkkinen; McLaren-Mercedes; 1:32:14.789; 2. (Germany) M. Schumacher; Ferrari; +2.211; 3. (United Kingdom) D. Coulthard; McLaren-Mercedes; +34.163

Fastest lap
- (Finland) Mika Häkkinen; McLaren-Mercedes; 1:20.450

The Luxembourg Grand Prix (German: Großer Preis von Luxemburg) was the name given to two races of the FIA Formula One World Championship, held in 1997 and 1998. Both races were held in Germany at the Nürburgring, (Note: All Formula One Grands Prix held at the Nürburgring since 1984 have used the 5 km (3.1 mi) long GP-Strecke and not the 21 km (13 mi) long Nordschleife, which was last used by Formula One in 1976.) which is located some 80 kilometres (50 miles) from the Germany–Luxembourg border.

The Luxembourg title was chosen in 1997 despite the race being held in Germany and not in Luxembourg's own territory as the Hockenheimring was already contracted to host the German Grand Prix. The Nürburgring had previously hosted the European Grand Prix in 1995 and 1996, but it was renamed due to other changes in the 1997 schedule. Following the cancellation of the Portuguese Grand Prix, a second race in Spain was added, with Jerez hosting the European Grand Prix along with the Spanish Grand Prix at Barcelona. Jerez was due to host the race again in 1998, but the rights to the European Grand Prix had been revoked from the organisers of the race after an incident on the podium in 1997. In 1999 the Nürburgring race returned to using the European Grand Prix title, which it held every year until 2007.

== History ==
=== 1997 ===
As it was, the Luxembourg Grand Prix provided a moment in history, as Renault-powered cars took the first four places at the finish with Jacques Villeneuve (Williams-Renault) taking first place. The race was also Villeneuve's final Formula One victory.

For a long time it looked as if Mika Häkkinen would take his first Formula One win as he pulled away at the front from his McLaren teammate David Coulthard. However, in the space of one lap, both McLarens had pulled out of the race with blown engines allowing Villeneuve to move close to an eventual World Championship. Michael Schumacher's race was over by the end of the first lap after his brother Ralf Schumacher collided with his teammate Giancarlo Fisichella at the first corner; this caused immediate retirement for three out of the four cars involved (Ralf, Fisichella, and Ukyo Katayama), and also caused suspension damage to the fourth car (Michael Schumacher's Ferrari) which also led to its retirement two laps later.

=== 1998 ===
1998 saw Mika Häkkinen gain revenge for his engine failure at the previous race by taking victory at this one, with Michael Schumacher second despite qualifying on pole, and Häkkinen's teammate Coulthard third. Häkkinen also, like Villeneuve the year prior, went on to win the World Championship in the final race of the season at Suzuka; this meant that every winner of the Luxembourg GP went on to win that year's World Championship.

== Winners ==
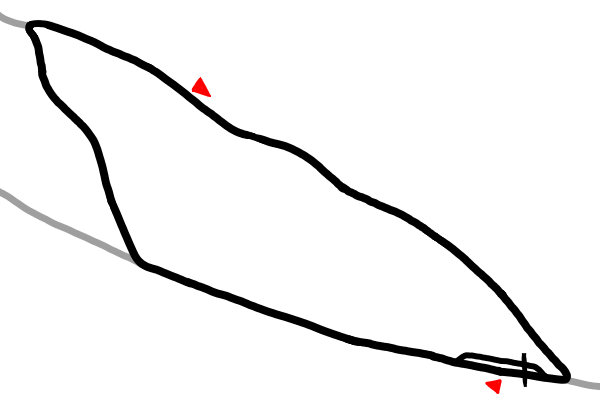
Findel Circuit layout (1949–1952)

A pink background indicates an event which was not part of the Formula One World Championship.

Year	Driver	Constructor	Location	Report
1949	(Italy) Luigi Villoresi	Ferrari	Findel	Report
1950	(Italy) Alberto Ascari	Ferrari	Findel	Report
1951	(United Kingdom) Alan Brown	Cooper-Norton	Findel	Report
1952	(United Kingdom) Les Leston	Cooper-Norton	Findel	Report
1953 – 1996	Not held			
1997	(Canada) Jacques Villeneuve	Williams-Renault	Nürburgring GP-Strecke	Report
1998	(Finland) Mika Häkkinen	McLaren-Mercedes	Nürburgring GP-Strecke	Report
1999	Replaced by European Grand Prix			
