= 1997 Luxembourg Grand Prix =

15th round of the 1997 Formula One season

Race 15 of 17 in the 1997 Formula One World Championship
← Previous race	Next race →
- The Nürburgring in its 1997 configuration

Race details
- Date: 28 September 1997
- Official name: Grosser Preis von Luxemburg 1997
- Location: Nürburgring, Nürburg, Germany
- Course: Permanent racing facility
- Course length: 4.556 km (2.831 miles)
- Distance: 67 laps, between 305.233 and 305.236 km (between 189.663 and 189.665 miles)
- Weather: Partially cloudy, mild and dry

Pole position
Driver	(Finland) Mika Häkkinen	McLaren-Mercedes
- Time: 1:16.602

Fastest lap
Driver	(Germany) Heinz-Harald Frentzen	Williams-Renault
- Time: 1:18.805 on lap 32

Podium
First	(Canada) Jacques Villeneuve	Williams-Renault
Second	(France) Jean Alesi	Benetton-Renault
Third	(Germany) Heinz-Harald Frentzen	Williams-Renault

The 1997 Luxembourg Grand Prix (formally the Grosser Preis von Luxemburg 1997) was a Formula One motor race held at the Nürburgring, Nürburg, Germany on 28 September 1997. It was the fifteenth race of the 1997 Formula One World Championship. The 67-lap race was won by Canadian Jacques Villeneuve, driving a Williams-Renault. Frenchman Jean Alesi finished second in a Benetton-Renault, with Villeneuve's German teammate Heinz-Harald Frentzen third.

Although Villeneuve went on to win the 1997 Drivers' Championship, this turned out to be his 11th and final Formula One victory; As of 2026, it is also the last win for a Canadian driver. It was the last victory for the Williams team until the 2001 San Marino Grand Prix, the last victory for a Renault engine until Fernando Alonso won the 2003 Hungarian Grand Prix, the last 1–2 finish between Renault-powered drivers until the 2006 Malaysian Grand Prix, and the last race where all Renault-powered drivers stood on the podium together until the 2010 Monaco Grand Prix. It was also the last win for a non-European Formula One driver until Rubens Barrichello won the 2000 German Grand Prix.

== Qualifying report ==
Qualifying saw Mika Häkkinen take pole position in the McLaren-Mercedes - the first-ever for the Finnish driver, the first for McLaren since the 1993 Australian Grand Prix, and the first for Mercedes (as an engine supplier or constructor) since the 1955 Italian Grand Prix. Villeneuve was alongside on the front row, while his Williams teammate Heinz-Harald Frentzen shared the second row with Giancarlo Fisichella in the Jordan. Michael Schumacher, leading Villeneuve in the Drivers' Championship by one point, was fifth in his Ferrari, sharing the third row with David Coulthard in the second McLaren. The top ten was completed by Gerhard Berger in the Benetton, Ralf Schumacher in the second Jordan, Rubens Barrichello in the Stewart, and Jean Alesi in the second Benetton.

=== Qualifying classification ===
Pos	No	Driver	Constructor	Time	Gap
1	9	(Finland) Mika Häkkinen	McLaren-Mercedes	1:16.602	
2	3	(Canada) Jacques Villeneuve	Williams-Renault	1:16.691	+0.089
3	4	(Germany) Heinz-Harald Frentzen	Williams-Renault	1:16.741	+0.139
4	12	(Italy) Giancarlo Fisichella	Jordan-Peugeot	1:17.289	+0.687
5	5	(Germany) Michael Schumacher	Ferrari	1:17.385	+0.783
6	10	(United Kingdom) David Coulthard	McLaren-Mercedes	1:17.387	+0.785
7	8	(Austria) Gerhard Berger	Benetton-Renault	1:17.587	+0.985
8	11	(Germany) Ralf Schumacher	Jordan-Peugeot	1:17.595	+0.993
9	22	(Brazil) Rubens Barrichello	Stewart-Ford	1:17.614	+1.012
10	7	(France) Jean Alesi	Benetton-Renault	1:17.620	+1.018
11	14	(France) Olivier Panis	Prost-Mugen-Honda	1:17.650	+1.048
12	23	(Denmark) Jan Magnussen	Stewart-Ford	1:17.722	+1.120
13	1	(United Kingdom) Damon Hill	Arrows-Yamaha	1:17.795	+1.193
14	6	(United Kingdom) Eddie Irvine	Ferrari	1:17.855	+1.253
15	2	(Brazil) Pedro Diniz	Arrows-Yamaha	1:18.128	+1.526
16	16	(United Kingdom) Johnny Herbert	Sauber-Petronas	1:18.303	+1.701
17	15	(Japan) Shinji Nakano	Prost-Mugen-Honda	1:18.699	+2.097
18	21	(Brazil) Tarso Marques	Minardi-Hart	1:19.347	+2.745
19	17	(Italy) Gianni Morbidelli	Sauber-Petronas	1:19.490	+2.888
20	19	(Finland) Mika Salo	Tyrrell-Ford	1:19.526	+2.924
21	18	(Netherlands) Jos Verstappen	Tyrrell-Ford	1:19.531	+2.929
22	20	(Japan) Ukyo Katayama	Minardi-Hart	1:20.615	+4.013
107% time: 1:21.964

== Race report ==
At the start, Häkkinen led away while teammate Coulthard jumped from sixth to second, ahead of Villeneuve. Meanwhile, Michael Schumacher moved alongside Fisichella, while Ralf Schumacher made a fast start to be alongside both cars going into the first corner. However, Ralf squeezed his Jordan teammate Fisichella for room, leaving the Italian driver with nowhere to go. The resultant collision saw Ralf's car launch into the air, and come down on top of Michael's Ferrari. Also involved was the Minardi of Ukyo Katayama, who was unsighted by the dust and ploughed into Fisichella's car. Ralf, Fisichella and Katayama all retired immediately, while Michael continued for two laps before pulling into the pits with suspension damage.

With Frentzen dropping back after banging wheels with Villeneuve and knocking off his ignition switch, and Berger cutting the first corner to avoid the aforementioned collision, Barrichello and Alesi moved into fourth and fifth respectively, followed by Jan Magnussen in the second Stewart. The top six remained unchanged until the first round of pit stops, during which Alesi was leapfrogged by Magnussen and Damon Hill in the Arrows.

At half-distance, Häkkinen led Coulthard by around 12 seconds, with Villeneuve four seconds behind the Scottish driver. Then, at the start of lap 43, Coulthard's engine blew. Häkkinen suffered the same failure moments later, putting Villeneuve in the lead. Both Stewarts also retired at around this time, Magnussen suffering a driveshaft failure and Barrichello's gearbox breaking, while Hill had stalled during his pit stop. This left all four Renault-powered cars in the top four, with Alesi second, Frentzen third and Berger fourth, while Pedro Diniz moved into fifth in the second Arrows, just ahead of the Prost of Olivier Panis, in his first race back after breaking his legs in Canada.

Villeneuve eventually took the chequered flag 11.7 seconds ahead of Alesi, with Frentzen a further 1.7 seconds back. Berger finished three seconds behind Frentzen, but 27 seconds ahead of Diniz. The Brazilian driver held off Panis, who in turn held off Johnny Herbert in the Sauber and Hill for the final point. The win gave Villeneuve a nine-point lead over Michael Schumacher in the Drivers' Championship with two races left to run, while Williams extended their lead over Ferrari in the Constructors' Championship to 26 points, needing just six more for their ninth title.

=== Race classification ===
Pos	No	Driver	Constructor	Tyre	Laps	Time/Retired	Grid	Points
1	3	(Canada) Jacques Villeneuve	Williams-Renault	G	67	1:31:27.843	2	10
2	7	(France) Jean Alesi	Benetton-Renault	G	67	+11.770	10	6
3	4	(Germany) Heinz-Harald Frentzen	Williams-Renault	G	67	+13.480	3	4
4	8	(Austria) Gerhard Berger	Benetton-Renault	G	67	+16.416	7	3
5	2	(Brazil) Pedro Diniz	Arrows-Yamaha	B	67	+43.147	15	2
6	14	(France) Olivier Panis	Prost-Mugen-Honda	B	67	+43.750	11	1
7	16	(United Kingdom) Johnny Herbert	Sauber-Petronas	G	67	+44.354	16	
8	1	(United Kingdom) Damon Hill	Arrows-Yamaha	B	67	+44.777	13	
9	17	(Italy) Gianni Morbidelli	Sauber-Petronas	G	66	+1 lap	19	
10	19	(Finland) Mika Salo	Tyrrell-Ford	G	66	+1 lap	20	
Ret	18	(Netherlands) Jos Verstappen	Tyrrell-Ford	G	50	Spun off	21	
Ret	9	(Finland) Mika Häkkinen	McLaren-Mercedes	G	43	Engine	1	
Ret	22	(Brazil) Rubens Barrichello	Stewart-Ford	B	43	Gearbox	9	
Ret	10	(United Kingdom) David Coulthard	McLaren-Mercedes	G	42	Engine	6	
Ret	23	(Denmark) Jan Magnussen	Stewart-Ford	B	40	Halfshaft	12	
Ret	6	(United Kingdom) Eddie Irvine	Ferrari	G	22	Engine	14	
Ret	15	(Japan) Shinji Nakano	Prost-Mugen-Honda	B	16	Engine	17	
Ret	5	(Germany) Michael Schumacher	Ferrari	G	2	Suspension/collision damage	5	
Ret	21	(Brazil) Tarso Marques	Minardi-Hart	B	1	Engine	18	
Ret	20	(Japan) Ukyo Katayama	Minardi-Hart	B	1	Collision	22	
Ret	12	(Italy) Giancarlo Fisichella	Jordan-Peugeot	G	0	Collision	4	
Ret	11	(Germany) Ralf Schumacher	Jordan-Peugeot	G	0	Collision	8	

== Championship standings after the race ==
Drivers' Championship standings

Pos	Driver	Points
1	(Canada) Jacques Villeneuve	77
2	(Germany) Michael Schumacher	68
3	(Germany) Heinz-Harald Frentzen	35
4	(France) Jean Alesi	34
5	(United Kingdom) David Coulthard	30

Constructors' Championship standings

Pos	Constructor	Points
1	(United Kingdom) Williams-Renault	112
2	(Italy) Ferrari	86
3	(Italy) Benetton-Renault	62
4	(United Kingdom) McLaren-Mercedes	44
5	(Republic of Ireland) Jordan-Peugeot	33

- Note: Only the top five positions are included for both sets of standings.

Previous race: 1997 Austrian Grand Prix	FIA Formula One World Championship; 1997 season	Next race: 1997 Japanese Grand Prix
Previous race: 1952 Luxembourg Grand Prix; Previous race at Nurburgring: 1996 European Grand Prix	Luxembourg Grand Prix	Next race: 1998 Luxembourg Grand Prix
