= 1997 Formula One World Championship =

51st season of FIA Formula One motor racing

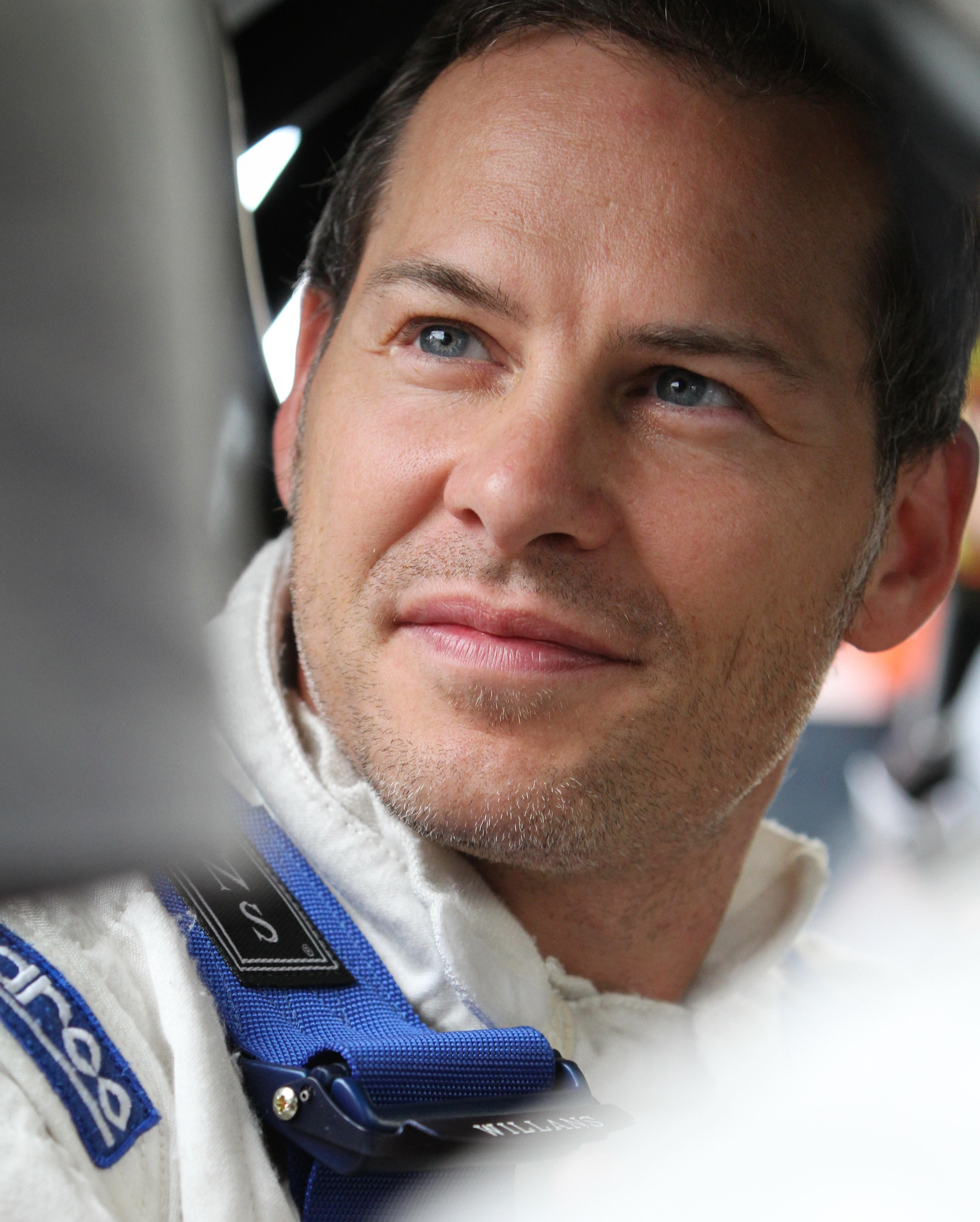
Jacques Villeneuve (pictured in 2010) won his first and only championship in his second year of F1 participation.

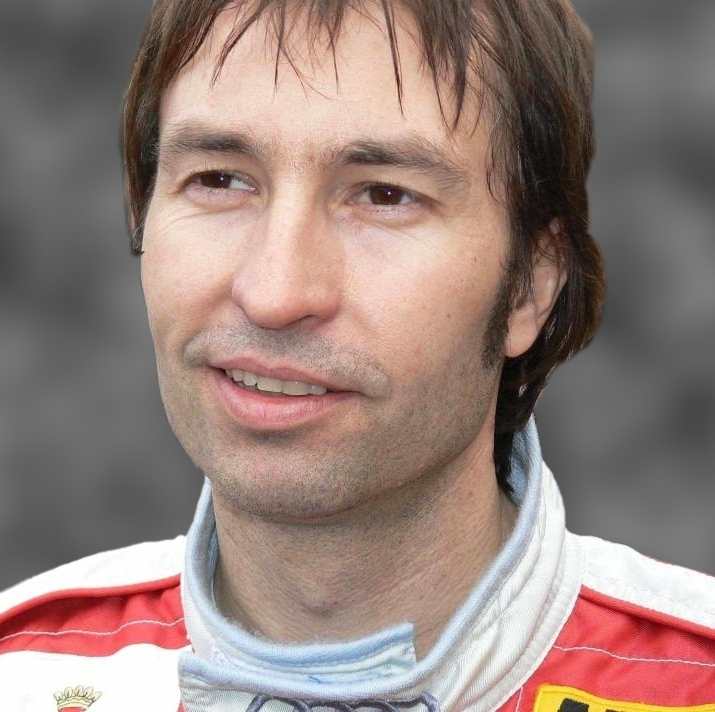
Villeneuve's teammate, Heinz-Harald Frentzen (pictured in 2006), was promoted to runner-up with 42 points following Michael Schumacher's disqualification from the standings at the end of the year.

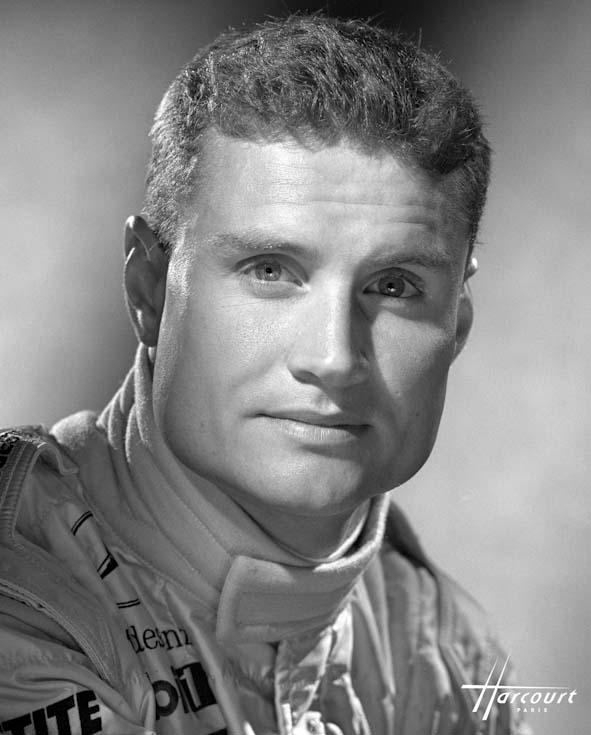
David Coulthard (pictured in 1999), finished the season ranked third for McLaren.

The 1997 FIA Formula One World Championship was the 51st season of FIA Formula One motor racing. It featured the 1997 Formula One World Championship for Drivers and the 1997 Formula One World Championship for Constructors, which were contested concurrently over a seventeen-race series that commenced on 9 March and ended on 26 October.

While Williams-Renault had beaten Ferrari to claim the Constructors' Championship, the Drivers' Championship however was won by Jacques Villeneuve under controversial circumstances: championship leader Michael Schumacher deliberately rammed him whilst trying to defend his race lead in the final race. Schumacher came to a halt in the gravel while Villeneuve finished third, giving him enough points to secure the drivers' championship. Schumacher was later deemed at fault for the accident by the FIA. He kept his five race wins, but was stripped of his 2nd place in the championship, promoting Villeneuve's Williams teammate Heinz-Harald Frentzen to second in the championship.

As of 2026, this is the last championship for a non-European driver, the last Constructors' and Drivers' championships for Williams, and the last championship won on Goodyear tyres who having been sole supplier for the previous five seasons, faced new competition in the form of Japanese tyre maker Bridgestone, who competed in their first full season of F1. It was also the last championship for a Renault-powered driver, until Fernando Alonso's championship in 2005. Engine supplier Renault ended its official involvement in the sport at the end of the 1997 season, its engines having won six consecutive World Constructors' titles from 1992 to 1997 and won five of the six F1 drivers' titles over the same period. Renault would subsequently return to F1 in an official capacity once more 2001, although its engines would continue to be used from 1998 to 2000 being maintained and prepared by both Mecachrome and Supertec for that intervening three-season period. This season was the last season for 12 years in which the cars would race on fully slick dry weather tyres.

== Teams and drivers ==
The following teams and drivers competed in the 1997 FIA Formula One World Championship.

Entrant	Constructor	Chassis	Engine	Tyre	No.	Driver	Rounds
(United Kingdom) Danka Arrows Yamaha	Arrows-Yamaha	A18	Yamaha OX11C/D 3.0 V10	B	1	(United Kingdom) Damon Hill	All
(United Kingdom) Danka Arrows Yamaha	Arrows-Yamaha	A18	Yamaha OX11C/D 3.0 V10	B	2	(Brazil) Pedro Diniz	All
(United Kingdom) Rothmans Williams Renault	Williams-Renault	FW19	Renault RS9 3.0 V10; Renault RS9B 3.0 V10	G	3	(Canada) Jacques Villeneuve	All
(United Kingdom) Rothmans Williams Renault	Williams-Renault	FW19	Renault RS9 3.0 V10; Renault RS9B 3.0 V10	G	4	(Germany) Heinz-Harald Frentzen	All
(Italy) Scuderia Ferrari Marlboro	Ferrari	F310B	Ferrari Tipo 046/2 3.0 V10	G	5	(Germany) Michael Schumacher	All
(Italy) Scuderia Ferrari Marlboro	Ferrari	F310B	Ferrari Tipo 046/2 3.0 V10	G	6	(United Kingdom) Eddie Irvine	All
(Italy) Mild Seven Benetton Renault	Benetton-Renault	B197	Renault RS9 3.0 V10; Renault RS9B 3.0 V10	G	7	(France) Jean Alesi	All
(Italy) Mild Seven Benetton Renault	Benetton-Renault	B197	Renault RS9 3.0 V10; Renault RS9B 3.0 V10	G	8	(Austria) Gerhard Berger	1–6, 10–17
(Italy) Mild Seven Benetton Renault	Benetton-Renault	B197	Renault RS9 3.0 V10; Renault RS9B 3.0 V10	G	8	(Austria) Alexander Wurz	7–9
(United Kingdom) West McLaren Mercedes	McLaren-Mercedes	MP4/12	Mercedes FO110E 3.0 V10; Mercedes FO110F 3.0 V10	G	9	(Finland) Mika Häkkinen	All
(United Kingdom) West McLaren Mercedes	McLaren-Mercedes	MP4/12	Mercedes FO110E 3.0 V10; Mercedes FO110F 3.0 V10	G	10	(United Kingdom) David Coulthard	All
(Republic of Ireland) Benson & Hedges Jordan Peugeot	Jordan-Peugeot	197	Peugeot A14 3.0 V10	G	11	(Germany) Ralf Schumacher	All
(Republic of Ireland) Benson & Hedges Jordan Peugeot	Jordan-Peugeot	197	Peugeot A14 3.0 V10	G	12	(Italy) Giancarlo Fisichella	All
(France) Prost Gauloises Blondes	Prost-Mugen-Honda	JS45	Mugen-Honda MF-301HB 3.0 V10	B	14	(France) Olivier Panis	1–7, 15–17
(France) Prost Gauloises Blondes	Prost-Mugen-Honda	JS45	Mugen-Honda MF-301HB 3.0 V10	B	14	(Italy) Jarno Trulli	8–14
(France) Prost Gauloises Blondes	Prost-Mugen-Honda	JS45	Mugen-Honda MF-301HB 3.0 V10	B	15	(Japan) Shinji Nakano	All
(Switzerland) Red Bull Sauber Petronas	Sauber-Petronas	C16	Petronas SPE-01 3.0 V10	G	16	(United Kingdom) Johnny Herbert	All
(Switzerland) Red Bull Sauber Petronas	Sauber-Petronas	C16	Petronas SPE-01 3.0 V10	G	17	(Italy) Nicola Larini	1–5
(Switzerland) Red Bull Sauber Petronas	Sauber-Petronas	C16	Petronas SPE-01 3.0 V10	G	17	(Italy) Gianni Morbidelli	6–7, 11–16
(Switzerland) Red Bull Sauber Petronas	Sauber-Petronas	C16	Petronas SPE-01 3.0 V10	G	17	(Argentina) Norberto Fontana	8–10, 17
(United Kingdom) PIAA Tyrrell Ford	Tyrrell-Ford	025	Ford-Cosworth ED4 3.0 V8; Ford-Cosworth ED5 3.0 V8	G	18	(Netherlands) Jos Verstappen	All
(United Kingdom) PIAA Tyrrell Ford	Tyrrell-Ford	025	Ford-Cosworth ED4 3.0 V8; Ford-Cosworth ED5 3.0 V8	G	19	(Finland) Mika Salo	All
(Italy) Minardi Team	Minardi-Hart	M197	Hart 830 3.0 V8	B	20	(Japan) Ukyo Katayama	All
(Italy) Minardi Team	Minardi-Hart	M197	Hart 830 3.0 V8	B	21	(Italy) Jarno Trulli	1–7
(Italy) Minardi Team	Minardi-Hart	M197	Hart 830 3.0 V8	B	21	(Brazil) Tarso Marques	8–17
(United Kingdom) HSBC Malaysia Stewart Ford	Stewart-Ford	SF01	Ford VJ Zetec-R 3.0 V10	B	22	(Brazil) Rubens Barrichello	All
(United Kingdom) HSBC Malaysia Stewart Ford	Stewart-Ford	SF01	Ford VJ Zetec-R 3.0 V10	B	23	(Denmark) Jan Magnussen	All
(United Kingdom) MasterCard Lola Formula One Racing Team	Lola-Ford	T97/30	Ford ECA Zetec-R 3.0 V8	B	24	(Italy) Vincenzo Sospiri	1
(United Kingdom) MasterCard Lola Formula One Racing Team	Lola-Ford	T97/30	Ford ECA Zetec-R 3.0 V8	B	25	(Brazil) Ricardo Rosset	1
Sources:

- ^{†} All engines were 3.0-litre configuration.

=== Team changes ===
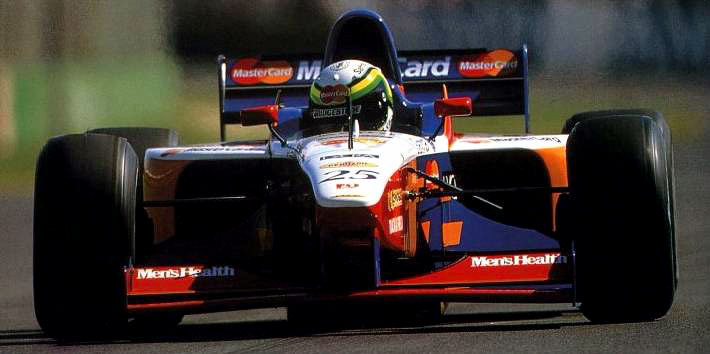
Lola-Ford failed to qualify for their only Grand Prix appearance.

- Stewart Grand Prix made their Formula One debut. They entered with factory backing of the Ford Motor Company.
- Lola also entered the sport. They had planned to debut in 1998, but hurried through the design phase, under heavy commercial pressure from their title sponsor Mastercard. After both Lola drivers failed to qualify in the first race, sponsors left and the team had to withdraw from the championship at the Brazilian GP.
- After twenty years in the sport, Ligier was sold from Flavio Briatore to Alain Prost and became Prost Grand Prix.
- Footwork reverted to the "Arrows" name after a buy-out by Tom Walkinshaw and switched from Hart engines to Yamaha.
- Tyrrell changed their engines as well, swapping from Yamaha to Ford.
- Sauber engaged in a partnership with new sponsor Petronas and formed Sauber Petronas Engineering. They secured the licensing rights to engine and gearbox components from Ferrari, allowing them to build and run nearly identical units to those used in the Ferraris. The engines were branded as Petronas, in deference to the role the company played in their development. This marked the first season since 1993 that Ferrari supplied engines to more than one team in the sport.
- Finally, on the front of tyre suppliers, Bridgestone entered into F1 and supplied tyres to Arrows, Prost, Minardi, Stewart and Lola.

=== Driver changes ===
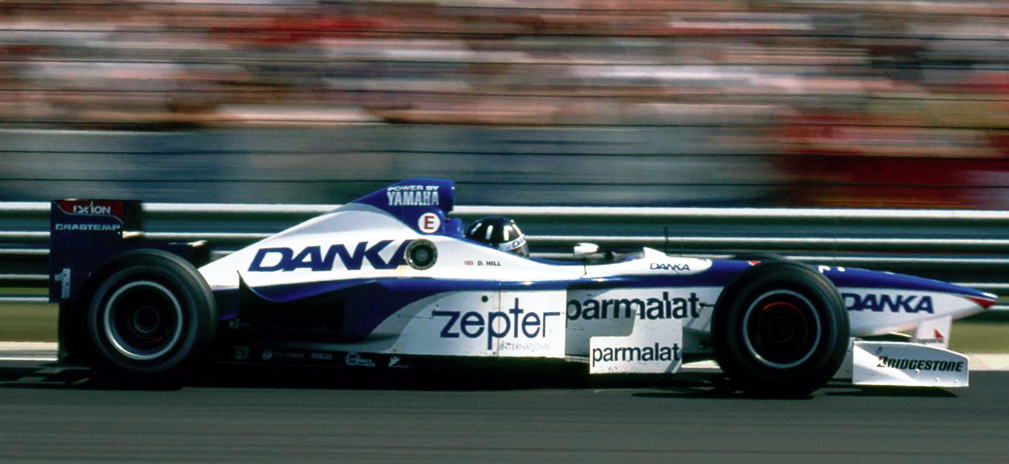
Damon Hill found a seat at Arrows after having been let go by Williams.

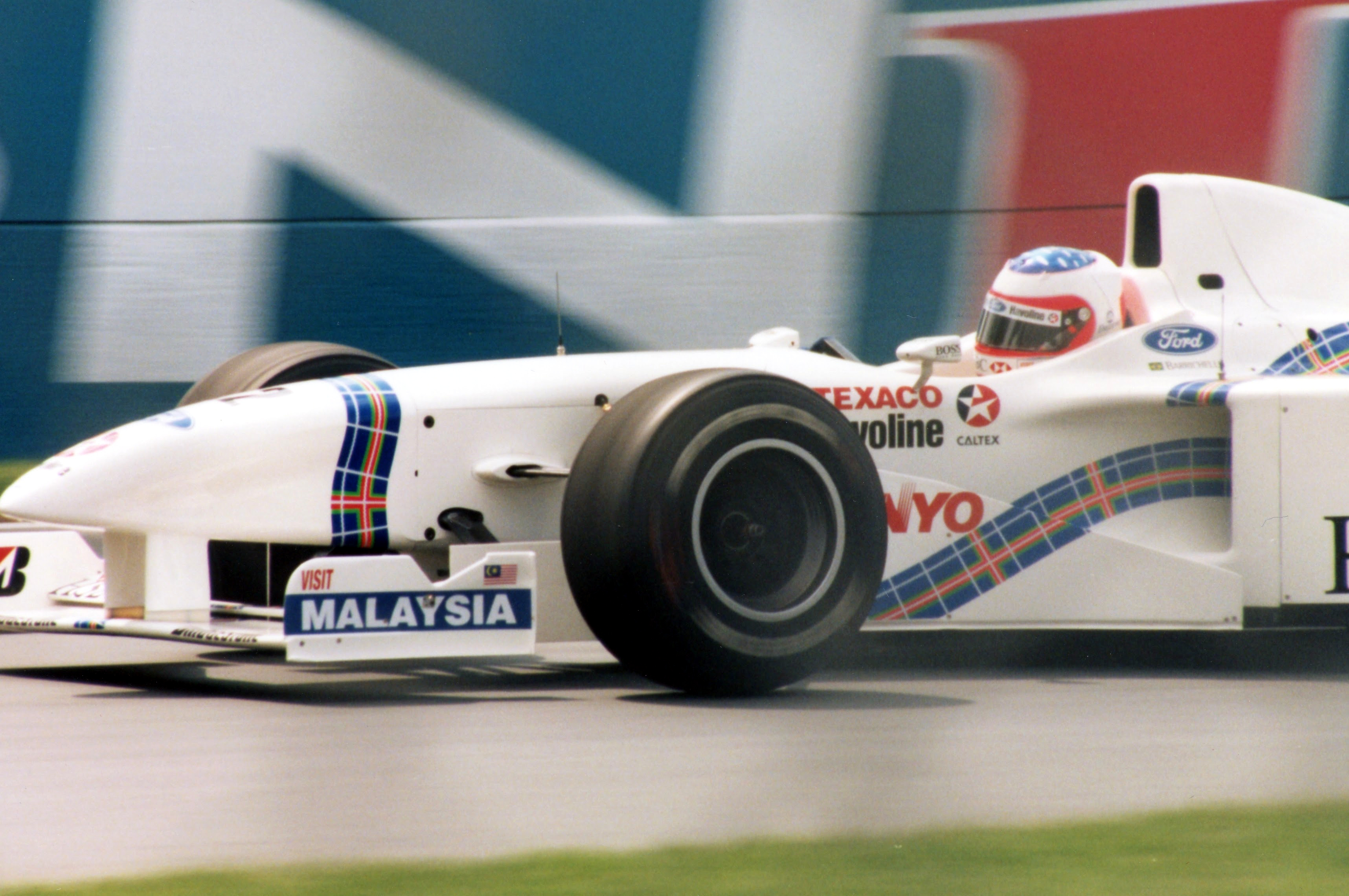
New team Stewart Grand Prix signed Rubens Barrichello and Jan Magnussen.

The biggest news at the beginning of the 1997 season was Damon Hill, 1996 champion, being dropped by Williams in favour of Heinz-Harald Frentzen. Hill was partnered at his new team, Arrows, with Brazilian Pedro Diniz, who was signed from Ligier. This was the only time in Arrows' history that the team had the number 1 on their car after signing the reigning World Champion.

Arrows' former drivers Jos Verstappen and Ricardo Rosset joined the Tyrrell and Lola team, respectively. Rosset was joined by Benetton's test driver Vincenzo Sospiri.

Reliant on their Japanese engine partners Mugen-Honda, Japanese driver Shinji Nakano joined Prost besides Olivier Panis, who was retained from 1996.

Thanks in part to the technical deal between Sauber and Ferrari, Ferrari test driver Nicola Larini signed with Sauber. Larini replaced Frentzen, who had moved to Williams.

Jordan signed debutant Ralf Schumacher, Michael's younger brother. He was rumoured to be partnered with Nigel Mansell, but the 1992 champion rejected the offer. So the team went for Giancarlo Fisichella, who drove his first races for Minardi in 1996.

Jordan's former driver Rubens Barrichello moved to newcomer Stewart Grand Prix, with his 1996 ex-teammate Martin Brundle unable to find a seat for 1997 and reluctantly leaving the sport as a driver. Stewart also signed Jan Magnussen, who had filled in at McLaren for an unwell Mika Häkkinen in 1995 and had raced in the CART series in 1996.

Verstappen, moving from Arrows to Tyrrell, replaced Ukyo Katayama, who found a place at Minardi. Katayama replaced Pedro Lamy, who moved into the FIA GT Championship. Alongside him, Italian rising star Jarno Trulli filled the final seat in the 1997 championship.

The Italian team Forti ceased to exist midway through 1996, and neither of their drivers, Luca Badoer and Andrea Montermini, were able to find a Formula One racing seat for 1997. Badoer moved into FIA GT, while Montermini became a test driver for Lola. Badoer would eventually return to F1 in 1999 with Minardi.

==== Mid-season changes ====
- The Lola team folded after the Australian Grand Prix, leaving Ricardo Rosset and Vincenzo Sospiri out of a drive. Rosset returned to F1 in 1998 with Tyrrell, while Sospiri saw out the 1997 season in IndyCar with Team Scandia.
- A series of disagreements with Peter Sauber saw Nicola Larini leave Sauber after the Monaco Grand Prix. He was replaced by Gianni Morbidelli, who had last raced in F1 with Footwork in 1995 and had spent 1996 testing for Jordan.
- Gerhard Berger fell ill before the Canadian Grand Prix and was unable to race for Benetton. He was replaced by countryman Alexander Wurz. Berger ultimately missed three races as he recovered from the illness and the death of his father, before returning at the German Grand Prix. Wurz would get a full-time drive with the team in 1998, as Berger retired at the end of this season.
- During the Canadian Grand Prix, Prost's Olivier Panis crashed heavily and broke his leg. He was replaced by Minardi driver Jarno Trulli, who in turn was replaced by Tarso Marques. Marques who had also made some appearances for the Minardi team the previous year. Panis missed seven races before returning at the Luxembourg Grand Prix. Trulli would join him as a full-time Prost driver in 1998.
- Between the Canadian and French Grands Prix, Gianni Morbidelli had an accident in testing and broke his arm, meaning Sauber had to make their second substitution of the year. They brought in test driver Norberto Fontana, who completed the next three races before Morbidelli's return at the 1997 Hungarian Grand Prix. Morbidelli suffered another testing accident following the Japanese Grand Prix, so Fontana competed again at the season-ending European Grand Prix.

== Calendar ==
The following seventeen Grands Prix took place in 1997.

Round	Grand Prix	Circuit	Date
1	Australian Grand Prix	(Australia) Albert Park Circuit, Melbourne	9 March
2	Brazilian Grand Prix	(Brazil) Autódromo José Carlos Pace, São Paulo	30 March
3	Argentine Grand Prix	(Argentina) Autódromo Oscar Alfredo Gálvez, Buenos Aires	13 April
4	San Marino Grand Prix	(Italy) Autodromo Enzo e Dino Ferrari, Imola	27 April
5	Monaco Grand Prix	Circuit de Monaco, Monte Carlo	11 May
6	Spanish Grand Prix	(Spain) Circuit de Catalunya, Montmeló	25 May
7	Canadian Grand Prix	(Canada) Circuit Gilles Villeneuve, Montreal	15 June
8	French Grand Prix	(France) Circuit de Nevers Magny-Cours, Magny-Cours	29 June
9	British Grand Prix	(United Kingdom) Silverstone Circuit, Silverstone	13 July
10	German Grand Prix	(Germany) Hockenheimring, Hockenheim	27 July
11	Hungarian Grand Prix	(Hungary) Hungaroring, Mogyoród	10 August
12	Belgian Grand Prix	(Belgium) Circuit de Spa-Francorchamps, Stavelot	24 August
13	Italian Grand Prix	(Italy) Autodromo Nazionale di Monza, Monza	7 September
14	Austrian Grand Prix	(Austria) A1-Ring, Spielberg	21 September
15	Luxembourg Grand Prix	(Germany) Nürburgring, Nürburg	28 September
16	Japanese Grand Prix	(Japan) Suzuka Circuit, Suzuka	12 October
17	European Grand Prix	(Spain) Circuito Permanente de Jerez, Jerez de la Frontera	26 October (Note: The European Grand Prix was not on the original 1997 Formula One Calendar, but it was added into the calendar on the date of 26 October as a replacement for the Portuguese Grand Prix.)

=== Calendar changes ===
- The Austrian Grand Prix returned to the calendar for the first time since 1987. The race would be held on shortened and redeveloped version of the old Österreichring referred to the A1 Ring in honour of the circuit's sponsor.
- The Portuguese Grand Prix was originally scheduled as the final round of the season, to be held at the Estoril circuit on 26 October. It was cancelled and replaced by the European Grand Prix at Circuito de Jerez in neighbouring Spain after the owners of the Estoril circuit failed to make requested changes to it. The Portuguese government had also proposed that the Estoril round be rescheduled for the 9th of November (after the Jerez round which had taken its originally scheduled date) to enable upgrades to the circuit to be completed in time for a race but this was rejected by the FIA and the teams.
- The Luxembourg Grand Prix was added to the World Championship for the first time, after being held as a non-championship race from 1949 until 1952. Despite the race title, this race would actually be held not in Luxembourg itself but instead at the Nürburgring in nearby Germany, which had hosted a race under the European Grand Prix title in the two seasons preceding this one. The title of German Grand Prix was already assigned to the race in Hockenheim and the European Grand Prix was already hosted in Jerez. For 1997 the Nürburgring race was moved back to the autumn and held in late September in contrast to the spring early season April date given to the 1996 Nürburgring race.

== Regulation changes ==
=== Technical regulations ===
Except for a more detailed description of the impact absorbing structures at the front and rear of the car, there were no changes for the 1997 season.

=== Sporting and event regulations ===
A revised Concorde agreement, laying out the rules for the 1997 to 2001 seasons, was signed by the FIA and eight of the eleven F1 teams that participated in the 1996 season. These were some of the changes made to the sporting regulations:

- The maximum number of races per year was increased to 17, up from 16.
- Friday free practice was abolished. The Saturday practice sessions were extended to one hour each. The number of practice laps allowed was no longer limited. (These changes seem to have been reversed at a later time, as the 1997 Sporting regulations still showed two practice sessions, two days before the race, and a limit of 30 laps per day.)
- Two tyre choices were permitted in practice, but one had to be selected to use in qualifying and race.

From this season on, the regulations gave room for starts behind the Safety Car if the track was wet.

== Season summary ==
=== Rounds 1 to 4 ===
The season started in Australia, with Canadian Jacques Villeneuve taking the first pole position of the season. The moment was short-lived, however, as Villeneuve was out of the race at the first corner, when he collided with Johnny Herbert. McLaren's David Coulthard went on to win the race, the second of his career, with Michael Schumacher finishing second and Mika Häkkinen finishing in third place.

Villeneuve once again took pole position in Brazil, and once again he was off at the first corner. Luckily for him, the race was restarted, and the Canadian took the lead on lap 49 from Gerhard Berger. The Austrian finished second and Olivier Panis continued his impressive form from 1996 with third place.

For the third time in a row, Jacques Villeneuve took pole position in Argentina. This time, it was Michael Schumacher who was out at the first turn, when he collided with Rubens Barrichello. Schumacher's teammate Eddie Irvine went on to challenge Villeneuve for the lead and he made several attempts to pass, but failed and had to settle for second. Debutant Ralf Schumacher managed to get onto the podium in third place.

Villeneuve continued his run of consecutive pole positions in San Marino, but it was his German teammate Frentzen that won his first and only Grand Prix for Williams. After Villeneuve retired with a gearbox failure, Frentzen was joined on the podium by the Ferraris of Schumacher and Irvine.

At this point, Villeneuve was on top of the standings with 20 points. He was followed by Schumacher with 14 and five drivers in a shared third place, all with 10 points.

=== Rounds 5 to 9 ===
Heinz-Harald Frentzen managed to end Jacques Villeneuve's run of pole positions at the Monaco Grand Prix. For the second time in successive seasons, the race was run in very wet conditions. Michael Schumacher won his first race of the season. Rubens Barrichello came home in second and gave Stewart not only their first podium finish, but their first points finish and their first finish of any kind. Schumacher's teammate Eddie Irvine took the final step on the podium for the second time in a row.

In Spain, Williams was back on top in qualifying: Villeneuve took his fifth pole and Frentzen joined him on the front row. Villeneuve went on to win the race, with fellow French-speaking drivers, Olivier Panis and Jean Alesi, coming second and third respectively. Panis was actually closing on the leader with rapid pace, but got held up by Irvine, which got him served a stop-go penalty.

In a slight shift of power, Michael Schumacher took pole position and the race win in the next two Grands Prix. In Canada, he was joined on the podium by Benetton's Jean Alesi and Jordan's Giancarlo Fisichella. In France, he saw Frentzen in the Williams and teammate Irvine next to him.

Villeneuve earned his sixth pole position of the season in Britain, with teammate Frentzen partnering him on the front row. Villeneuve saw Mika Häkkinen take the lead when he was stuck in the pit lane for half a minute. Häkkinen, however, retired with a blown engine and Villeneuve went on to win the race, with Alesi in second and Alexander Wurz, filling in for Gerhard Berger, coming third. It was an all-Renault-powered podium. Schumacher failed to complete the race after he retired with a wheel bearing problem.

In the championship, Schumacher had the lead with 47 points, closely followed by Villeneuve with 43. Third place was being contested by Alesi (21 points), Frentzen (19) and Irvine (18).

=== Rounds 10 to 14 ===
On his return, Gerhard Berger managed to get pole for the German Grand Prix. Fastest lap and race victory followed, which would ultimately be Berger's and Benetton's final win. It was also Benetton's only win as an Italian-licensed team, making Benetton the only team to have won races under more than one nationality, and the first win for an Italian constructor other than Ferrari since Maserati´s win at the 1957 German Grand Prix. Championship leader Michael Schumacher came second and Mika Häkkinen came third.

The next race, in Hungary, was one of the most memorable races in the 1997 season. Schumacher took pole, with Villeneuve partnering him on the front row. 1996 champion Damon Hill in the Arrows had only qualified as high as ninth this season, but got up to third place on the Hungaroring. The start of the race saw Hill overtake the Williams ahead of him, and on lap ten, the Brit overtook the leading Scuderia Ferrari. Hill kept the lead until the last part of the race, when he reported that he had problems with his car. On the final lap, Jacques Villeneuve took the lead, achieving a milestone 100th Grand Prix victory for Williams.

After two very exciting Grands Prix, the fans' hopes were high for Belgium. Villeneuve took pole position, with Alesi in the Benetton behind him and his championship rival, Michael Schumacher, in third. Villeneuve had dominated the morning warm-up, held in hot, dry weather. But when heavy rain fell with half an hour to go before the race start, his championship rival, Michael Schumacher, decided to run his spare car, which was set up for wet conditions. The front two started the race on full-wet tyres, while the rest of the grid used the intermediates. This turned out to be the right call. After the first safety car start in Formula One history, Schumacher overtook Alesi and Villeneuve within two laps and by lap 12, his lead had stretched to over a minute. Villeneuve dropped down to 16th place and only recovered to fifth. Schumacher won and saw Giancarlo Fisichella and Heinz-Harald Frentzen next to him on the podium.

Alesi scored his first and only pole position of the season in Italy, with Frentzen starting second. Villeneuve and Schumacher took off in fourth and ninth, respectively. Coulthard, who started in sixth, got up to third position at the start and moved into the lead during the pit stops. He scored his second win of the season, ahead of Alesi and Frentzen. This was the only race in the year without Villeneuve or Schumacher on the podium.

In Austria, Villeneuve managed to get his seventh pole position of the season. The Canadian was partnered on the front row by Finnish driver Mika Häkkinen. Häkkinen actually took the lead but, like it happened at Silverstone, had to retire with a blown engine. Schumacher had again started in ninth, but recovered to third during the race. However, he was handed a stop-go penalty for overtaking under yellow flags and fell down to sixth at the finish. Villeneuve went on to win the Grand Prix, with Coulthard and Frentzen joining him on the podium.

The gap between the championship rivals had now closed up to just one point. Frentzen (31 points) was fighting Coulthard (30) and Alesi (28) over third place.

=== Rounds 15 to 17 ===
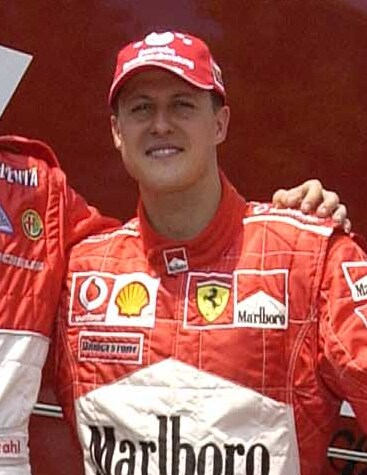
Michael Schumacher (pictured in 2003) initially finished runner up, but was disqualified after colliding with Villeneuve during the last race.

At the Luxembourg Grand Prix, held at the Nürburgring in Germany, Mika Häkkinen managed to earn pole. It was his first career pole, McLaren's first pole since 1993 and Mercedes's first since their return to Formula One in 1994. Ferrari's Michael Schumacher started in fifth, but was taken out at the first corner. Häkkinen's teammate David Coulthard shot up the order and McLaren looked set for a 1–2 finish, until both cars broke down in quick succession. Williams' Jacques Villeneuve was therefore gifted a win (which would end up to be the last of his career). For the first time since Spain, Villeneuve now had the lead in the championship. Jean Alesi and Heinz-Harald Frentzen completed the podium, making it, for the second time in the 1997 season, an all-Renault-powered podium.

Villeneuve continued his strong form by taking his eighth pole position in the year in Japan. However, during qualifying, he was deemed to have ignored the yellow flags. A disqualification hang over him and with his appeal being judged, he started the race and finished fifth. Michael Schumacher won the race, ahead of Williams' Frentzen and Ferrari teammate Eddie Irvine. Williams dropped their appeal after the race, leaving Japan with no points for Villeneuve and seeing Schumacher again one point ahead in the Drivers' Championship.

The European Grand Prix at Jerez saw a noteworthy qualifying session in which three drivers (Villeneuve, Schumacher, and Frentzen) all set the same fastest time. Villeneuve was awarded pole position, since he had set the time first, and this would be the final pole of his F1 career. At the start of the race, Schumacher got away well, overtaking Villeneuve to take the lead. By lap 48, Villeneuve was catching up and attempted to overtake. Braking later than the German at the Dry Sac corner, he had the inside line and was slightly ahead. Schumacher then turned into him and the Ferrari's front right wheel connected with the sidepod of the Williams. Schumacher retired on the spot. Villeneuve dropped to third, but it earned him four points, enough to take the 1997 Drivers' Championship. Mika Häkkinen went on to take his first ever career victory and with Coulthard finishing second, McLaren scored the only 1-2 finish by a team during the 1997 season.

After the race, Schumacher was deemed by the FIA to have been "deliberate" about causing an avoidable accident and was disqualified from the entire championship, although his race results (grid positions, finishing positions, points) were held up. This meant no damage to Ferrari's constructor points, but Williams still won the 1997 Constructors' Championship with a difference of 21 points. In the Drivers' Championship, Frentzen moved up to second, six points ahead of both Coulthard and Alesi.

== Results and standings ==
=== Grands Prix ===
Round	Grand Prix	Pole position	Fastest lap	Winning driver	Constructor	Report
1	(Australia) Australian Grand Prix	(Canada) Jacques Villeneuve	(Germany) Heinz-Harald Frentzen	(United Kingdom) David Coulthard	(United Kingdom) McLaren-Mercedes	Report
2	(Brazil) Brazilian Grand Prix	(Canada) Jacques Villeneuve	(Canada) Jacques Villeneuve	(Canada) Jacques Villeneuve	(United Kingdom) Williams-Renault	Report
3	(Argentina) Argentine Grand Prix	(Canada) Jacques Villeneuve	(Austria) Gerhard Berger	(Canada) Jacques Villeneuve	(United Kingdom) Williams-Renault	Report
4	(Italy) San Marino Grand Prix	(Canada) Jacques Villeneuve	(Germany) Heinz-Harald Frentzen	(Germany) Heinz-Harald Frentzen	(United Kingdom) Williams-Renault	Report
5	Monaco Grand Prix	(Germany) Heinz-Harald Frentzen	(Germany) Michael Schumacher	(Germany) Michael Schumacher	(Italy) Ferrari	Report
6	(Spain) Spanish Grand Prix	(Canada) Jacques Villeneuve	(Italy) Giancarlo Fisichella	(Canada) Jacques Villeneuve	(United Kingdom) Williams-Renault	Report
7	(Canada) Canadian Grand Prix	(Germany) Michael Schumacher	(United Kingdom) David Coulthard	(Germany) Michael Schumacher	(Italy) Ferrari	Report
8	(France) French Grand Prix	(Germany) Michael Schumacher	(Germany) Michael Schumacher	(Germany) Michael Schumacher	(Italy) Ferrari	Report
9	(United Kingdom) British Grand Prix	(Canada) Jacques Villeneuve	(Germany) Michael Schumacher	(Canada) Jacques Villeneuve	(United Kingdom) Williams-Renault	Report
10	(Germany) German Grand Prix	(Austria) Gerhard Berger	(Austria) Gerhard Berger	(Austria) Gerhard Berger	(Italy) Benetton-Renault	Report
11	(Hungary) Hungarian Grand Prix	(Germany) Michael Schumacher	(Germany) Heinz-Harald Frentzen	(Canada) Jacques Villeneuve	(United Kingdom) Williams-Renault	Report
12	(Belgium) Belgian Grand Prix	(Canada) Jacques Villeneuve	(Canada) Jacques Villeneuve	(Germany) Michael Schumacher	(Italy) Ferrari	Report
13	(Italy) Italian Grand Prix	(France) Jean Alesi	(Finland) Mika Häkkinen	(United Kingdom) David Coulthard	(United Kingdom) McLaren-Mercedes	Report
14	(Austria) Austrian Grand Prix	(Canada) Jacques Villeneuve	(Canada) Jacques Villeneuve	(Canada) Jacques Villeneuve	(United Kingdom) Williams-Renault	Report
15	(Germany) Luxembourg Grand Prix	(Finland) Mika Häkkinen	(Germany) Heinz-Harald Frentzen	(Canada) Jacques Villeneuve	(United Kingdom) Williams-Renault	Report
16	(Japan) Japanese Grand Prix	(Canada) Jacques Villeneuve	(Germany) Heinz-Harald Frentzen	(Germany) Michael Schumacher	(Italy) Ferrari	Report
17	(Spain) European Grand Prix	(Canada) Jacques Villeneuve	(Germany) Heinz-Harald Frentzen	(Finland) Mika Häkkinen	(United Kingdom) McLaren-Mercedes	Report

=== Scoring system ===
Points were awarded to the top six finishers in each race as follows:

Position	1st	2nd	3rd	4th	5th	6th
Points	10	6	4	3	2	1

=== World Drivers' Championship standings ===
Pos.	Driver	AUS (Australia)	BRA (Brazil)	ARG (Argentina)	SMR (Italy)	MON (Monaco)	ESP (Spain)	CAN (Canada)	FRA (France)	GBR (United Kingdom)	GER (Germany)	HUN (Hungary)	BEL (Belgium)	ITA (Italy)	AUT (Austria)	LUX (Germany)	JPN (Japan)	EUR (Spain)	Points
1	(Canada) Jacques Villeneuve	Ret^{P}	1^{P}^{F}	1^{P}	Ret^{P}	Ret	1^{P}	Ret	4	1^{P}	Ret	1	5^{P}^{F}	5	1^{P}^{F}	1	DSQ^{P}	3^{P}	81
2	(Germany) Heinz-Harald Frentzen	8^{F}^{†}	9	Ret	1^{F}	Ret^{P}	8	4	2	Ret	Ret	Ret^{F}	3	3	3	3^{F}	2^{F}	6^{F}	42
3	(United Kingdom) David Coulthard	1	10	Ret	Ret	Ret	6	7^{F}	7^{†}	4	Ret	Ret	Ret	1	2	Ret	10^{†}	2	36
4	(France) Jean Alesi	Ret	6	7	5	Ret	3	2	5	2	6	11	8	2^{P}	Ret	2	5	13	36
5	(Austria) Gerhard Berger	4	2	6^{F}	Ret	9	10				1^{P}^{F}	8	6	7	10	4	8	4	27
6	(Finland) Mika Häkkinen	3	4	5	6	Ret	7	Ret	Ret	Ret	3	Ret	DSQ	9^{F}	Ret	Ret^{P}	4	1	27
7	(United Kingdom) Eddie Irvine	Ret	16	2	3	3	12	Ret	3	Ret	Ret	9^{†}	10^{†}	8	Ret	Ret	3	5	24
8	(Italy) Giancarlo Fisichella	Ret	8	Ret	4	6	9^{F}	3	9	7	11^{†}	Ret	2	4	4	Ret	7	11	20
9	(France) Olivier Panis	5	3	Ret	8	4	2	11^{†}								6	Ret	7	16
10	(United Kingdom) Johnny Herbert	Ret	7	4	Ret	Ret	5	5	8	Ret	Ret	3	4	Ret	8	7	6	8	15
11	(Germany) Ralf Schumacher	Ret	Ret	3	Ret	Ret	Ret	Ret	6	5	5	5	Ret	Ret	5	Ret	9	Ret	13
12	(United Kingdom) Damon Hill	DNS	17^{†}	Ret	Ret	Ret	Ret	9	12	6	8	2	13^{†}	Ret	7	8	11	Ret	7
13	(Brazil) Rubens Barrichello	Ret	Ret	Ret	Ret	2	Ret	Ret	Ret	Ret	Ret	Ret	Ret	13	14^{†}	Ret	Ret	Ret	6
14	(Austria) Alexander Wurz							Ret	Ret	3									4
15	(Italy) Jarno Trulli	9	12	9	DNS	Ret	15	Ret	10	8	4	7	15	10	Ret				3
16	(Brazil) Pedro Diniz	10	Ret	Ret	Ret	Ret	Ret	8	Ret	Ret	Ret	Ret	7	Ret	13^{†}	5	12	Ret	2
=	(Finland) Mika Salo	Ret	13	8	9	5	Ret	Ret	Ret	Ret	Ret	13	11	Ret	Ret	10	Ret	12	2
18	(Japan) Shinji Nakano	7	14	Ret	Ret	Ret	Ret	6	Ret	11^{†}	7	6	Ret	11	Ret	Ret	Ret	10	2
19	(Italy) Nicola Larini	6	11	Ret	7	Ret													1
—	(Denmark) Jan Magnussen	Ret	DNS	10^{†}	Ret	7	13	Ret	Ret	Ret	Ret	Ret	12	Ret	Ret	Ret	Ret	9	0
—	(Netherlands) Jos Verstappen	Ret	15	Ret	10	8	11	Ret	Ret	Ret	10	Ret	Ret	Ret	12	Ret	13	16	0
—	(Italy) Gianni Morbidelli						14	10				Ret	9	12	9	9	DNS		0
—	(Argentina) Norberto Fontana								Ret	9	9							14	0
—	(Japan) Ukyo Katayama	Ret	18	Ret	11	10	Ret	Ret	11	Ret	Ret	10	14^{†}	Ret	11	Ret	Ret	17	0
—	(Brazil) Tarso Marques								Ret	10	Ret	12	Ret	14	EX	Ret	Ret	15	0
—	(Italy) Vincenzo Sospiri	DNQ																	0
—	(Brazil) Ricardo Rosset	DNQ																	0
DSQ	(Germany) Michael Schumacher	2	5	Ret	2	1^{F}	4	1^{P}	1^{P}^{F}	Ret^{F}	2	4^{P}	1	6	6	Ret	1	Ret	78 (Note: Michael Schumacher was excluded from the results of the Drivers' Championship due to dangerous driving in the European Grand Prix, where he was deemed to have caused an avoidable collision with Jacques Villeneuve. The exclusion did not affect the results of the Constructors' Championship. Schumacher retained his points and race wins achieved during the 1997 season. He remains the only driver to be disqualified from a Formula One Drivers' Championship.)
Pos.	Driver	AUS (Australia)	BRA (Brazil)	ARG (Argentina)	SMR (Italy)	MON (Monaco)	ESP (Spain)	CAN (Canada)	FRA (France)	GBR (United Kingdom)	GER (Germany)	HUN (Hungary)	BEL (Belgium)	ITA (Italy)	AUT (Austria)	LUX (Germany)	JPN (Japan)	EUR (Spain)	Points

Key
Colour	Result
Gold	Winner
Silver	Second place
Bronze	Third place
Green	Other points position
Blue	Other classified position
Blue	Not classified, finished (NC)
Purple	Not classified, retired (Ret)
Red	Did not qualify (DNQ)
Black	Disqualified (DSQ)
White	Did not start (DNS)
White	Race cancelled (C)
Blank	Did not practice (DNP)
Blank	Excluded (EX)
Blank	Did not arrive (DNA)
Blank	Withdrawn (WD)
Blank	Did not enter (empty cell)
Annotation	Meaning
P	Pole position
F	Fastest lap

Notes:

- † – Driver did not finish the Grand Prix but was classified, as he completed more than 90% of the race distance.
- Drivers who did not score points were not classified in a championship position by the FIA.

=== World Constructors' Championship standings ===
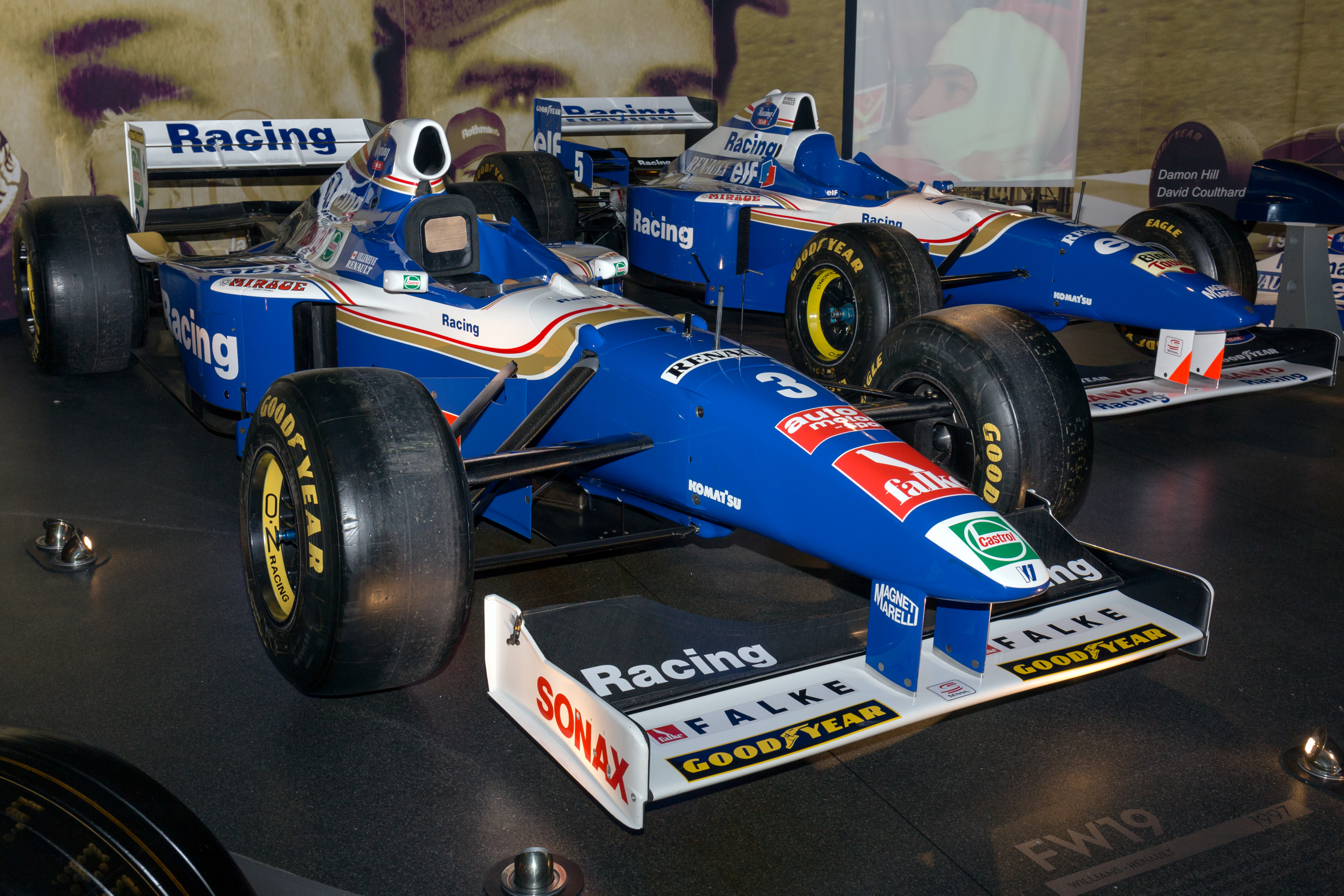
Williams-Renault won the Constructors' Championship with the FW19.

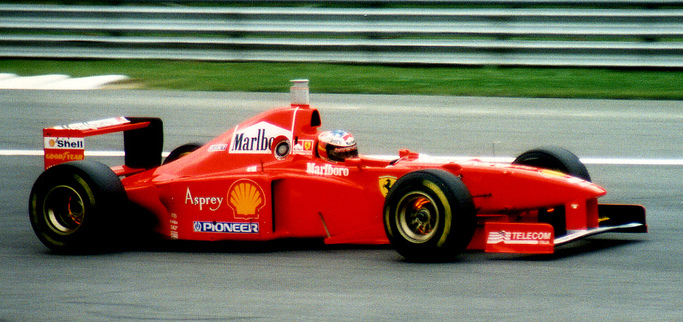
Despite Schumacher's disqualification, Ferrari finished second with the F310B.

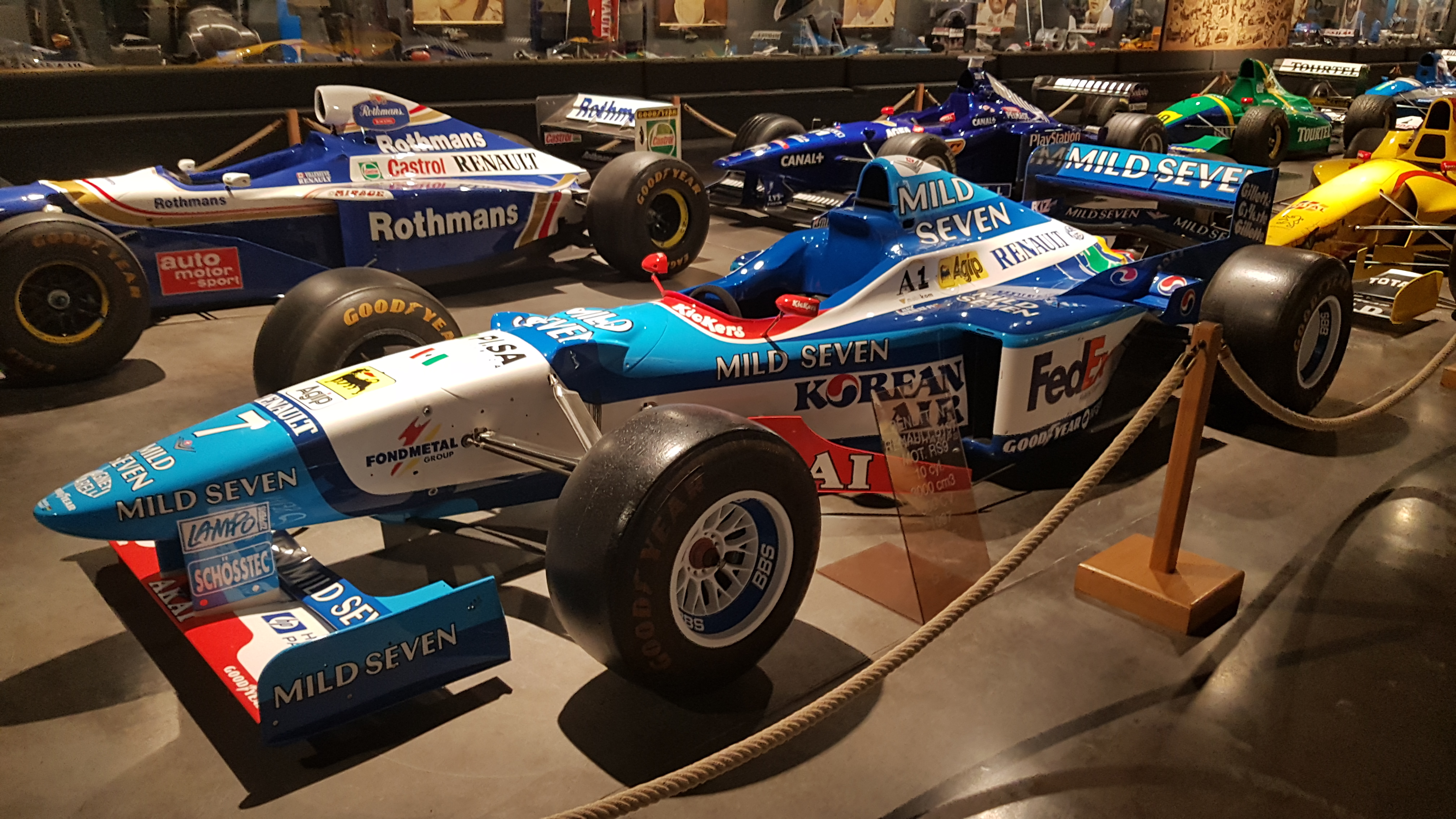
Benetton-Renault finished third with the B197.

Pos.	Constructor	No.	AUS (Australia)	BRA (Brazil)	ARG (Argentina)	SMR (Italy)	MON (Monaco)	ESP (Spain)	CAN (Canada)	FRA (France)	GBR (United Kingdom)	GER (Germany)	HUN (Hungary)	BEL (Belgium)	ITA (Italy)	AUT (Austria)	LUX (Germany)	JPN (Japan)	EUR (Spain)	Points
1	(United Kingdom) Williams-Renault	3	Ret^{P}	1^{P}^{F}	1^{P}	Ret^{P}	Ret	1^{P}	Ret	4	1^{P}	Ret	1	5^{P}^{F}	5	1^{P}^{F}	1	DSQ^{P}	3^{P}	123
1	(United Kingdom) Williams-Renault	4	8^{F}^{†}	9	Ret	1^{F}	Ret^{P}	8	4	2	Ret	Ret	Ret^{F}	3	3	3	3^{F}	2^{F}	6^{F}	123
2	(Italy) Ferrari	5	2	5	Ret	2	1^{F}	4	1^{P}	1^{P}^{F}	Ret^{F}	2	4^{P}	1	6	6	Ret	1	Ret	102
2	(Italy) Ferrari	6	Ret	16	2	3	3	12	Ret	3	Ret	Ret	9^{†}	10^{†}	8	Ret	Ret	3	5	102
3	(Italy) Benetton-Renault	7	Ret	6	7	5	Ret	3	2	5	2	6	11	8	2^{P}	Ret	2	5	13	67
3	(Italy) Benetton-Renault	8	4	2	6^{F}	Ret	9	10	Ret	Ret	3	1^{P}^{F}	8	6	7	10	4	8	4	67
4	(United Kingdom) McLaren-Mercedes	9	3	4	5	6	Ret	7	Ret	Ret	Ret	3	Ret	DSQ	9^{F}	Ret	Ret^{P}	4	1	63
4	(United Kingdom) McLaren-Mercedes	10	1	10	Ret	Ret	Ret	6	7^{F}	7^{†}	4	Ret	Ret	Ret	1	2	Ret	10^{†}	2	63
5	(Republic of Ireland) Jordan-Peugeot	11	Ret	Ret	3	Ret	Ret	Ret	Ret	6	5	5	5	Ret	Ret	5	Ret	9	Ret	33
5	(Republic of Ireland) Jordan-Peugeot	12	Ret	8	Ret	4	6	9^{F}	3	9	7	11^{†}	Ret	2	4	4	Ret	7	11	33
6	(France) Prost-Mugen-Honda	14	5	3	Ret	8	4	2	11^{†}	10	8	4	7	15	10	Ret	6	Ret	7	21
6	(France) Prost-Mugen-Honda	15	7	14	Ret	Ret	Ret	Ret	6	Ret	11^{†}	7	6	Ret	11	Ret	Ret	Ret	10	21
7	(Switzerland) Sauber-Petronas	16	Ret	7	4	Ret	Ret	5	5	8	Ret	Ret	3	4	Ret	8	7	6	8	16
7	(Switzerland) Sauber-Petronas	17	6	11	Ret	7	Ret	14	10	Ret	9	9	Ret	9	12	9	9	DNS	14	16
8	(United Kingdom) Arrows-Yamaha	1	DNS	17^{†}	Ret	Ret	Ret	Ret	9	12	6	8	2	13^{†}	Ret	7	8	11	Ret	9
8	(United Kingdom) Arrows-Yamaha	2	10	Ret	Ret	Ret	Ret	Ret	8	Ret	Ret	Ret	Ret	7	Ret	13^{†}	5	12	Ret	9
9	(United Kingdom) Stewart-Ford	22	Ret	Ret	Ret	Ret	2	Ret	Ret	Ret	Ret	Ret	Ret	Ret	13	14^{†}	Ret	Ret	Ret	6
9	(United Kingdom) Stewart-Ford	23	Ret	DNS	10^{†}	Ret	7	13	Ret	Ret	Ret	Ret	Ret	12	Ret	Ret	Ret	Ret	9	6
10	(United Kingdom) Tyrrell-Ford	18	Ret	15	Ret	10	8	11	Ret	Ret	Ret	10	Ret	Ret	Ret	12	Ret	13	16	2
10	(United Kingdom) Tyrrell-Ford	19	Ret	13	8	9	5	Ret	Ret	Ret	Ret	Ret	13	11	Ret	Ret	10	Ret	12	2
—	(Italy) Minardi-Hart	20	Ret	18	Ret	11	10	Ret	Ret	11	Ret	Ret	10	14^{†}	Ret	11	Ret	Ret	17	0
—	(Italy) Minardi-Hart	21	9	12	9	DNS	Ret	15	Ret	Ret	10	Ret	12	Ret	14	EX	Ret	Ret	15	0
—	(United Kingdom) Lola-Ford	24	DNQ	WD																0
—	(United Kingdom) Lola-Ford	25	DNQ	WD																0
Pos.	Constructor	No.	AUS (Australia)	BRA (Brazil)	ARG (Argentina)	SMR (Italy)	MON (Monaco)	ESP (Spain)	CAN (Canada)	FRA (France)	GBR (United Kingdom)	GER (Germany)	HUN (Hungary)	BEL (Belgium)	ITA (Italy)	AUT (Austria)	LUX (Germany)	JPN (Japan)	EUR (Spain)	Points

Notes:

- † – Driver did not finish the Grand Prix but was classified, as he completed more than 90% of the race distance.
- Constructors that did not score points were not classified in a championship position by the FIA.
