= 1997 German Grand Prix =

1997 Formula One race

Race 10 of 17 in the 1997 Formula One World Championship
← Previous race	Next race →

Race details
- Date: 27 July 1997
- Official name: LIX Grosser Mobil 1 Preis von Deutschland
- Location: Hockenheimring; Hockenheim, Baden-Württemberg, Germany
- Course: Permanent racing facility
- Course length: 6.823 km (4.256 miles)
- Distance: 45 laps, 307.035 km (191.537 miles)
- Weather: Sunny, dry track

Pole position
Driver	(Austria) Gerhard Berger	Benetton-Renault
- Time: 1:41.873

Fastest lap
Driver	(Austria) Gerhard Berger	Benetton-Renault
- Time: 1:45.747 on lap 9

Podium
First	(Austria) Gerhard Berger	Benetton-Renault
Second	(Germany) Michael Schumacher	Ferrari
Third	(Finland) Mika Häkkinen	McLaren-Mercedes

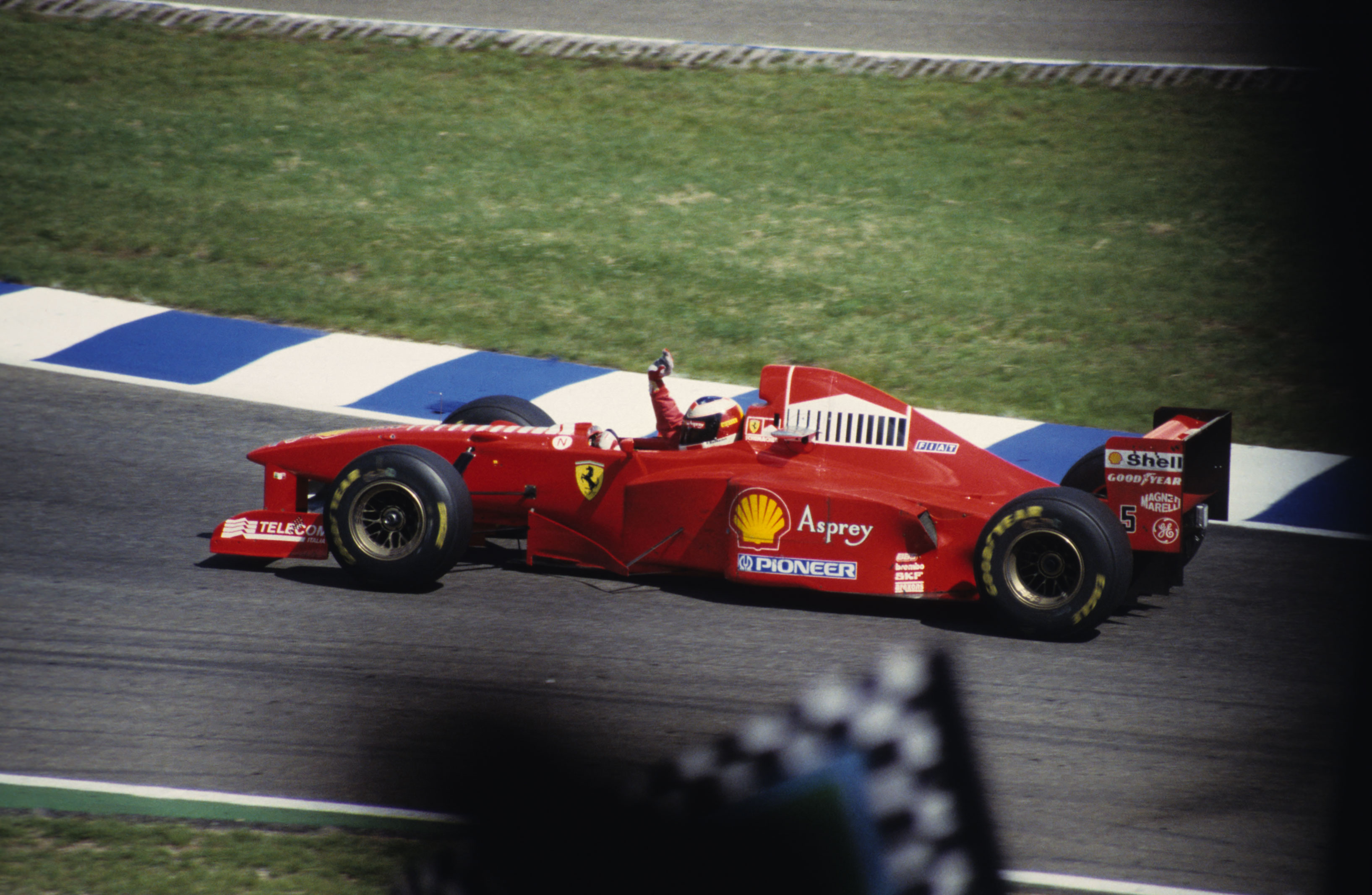
Local driver Michael Schumacher finished second in a Ferrari, behind Gerhard Berger's Benetton-Renault.

The 1997 German Grand Prix (formally the LIX Grosser Mobil 1 Preis von Deutschland) was a Formula One motor race held at Hockenheim, Baden-Württemberg, Germany on 27 July 1997. It was the tenth race of the 1997 Formula One World Championship.

The 45-lap race was won by Austrian Gerhard Berger, driving a Benetton-Renault. Having missed the previous three races due to a sinus problem, Berger took pole position and led the race from start to finish, except for the pit stops. It was Berger's tenth and final Grand Prix victory, the 27th and last for the Benetton team, and his final podium in Formula One. It was also the last victory for an Austrian driver, as of 2025. Local driver Michael Schumacher finished second in a Ferrari, with Finn Mika Häkkinen third in a McLaren-Mercedes.

With Jacques Villeneuve failing to finish in his Williams-Renault, Schumacher extended his lead over the Canadian in the Drivers' Championship to 10 points.

== Report ==
=== Background ===
Going into the race, the Drivers' Championship had developed into a battle between Ferrari driver Michael Schumacher and Williams driver Jacques Villeneuve. Schumacher led Villeneuve by four points, 47 to 43, although Villeneuve had won four races to Schumacher's three. Jean Alesi, driving for Benetton, was a distant third on 21 points. Similarly, the Constructors' Championship had become a battle between Ferrari and Williams, with the Italian team leading by three points, 65 to 62, and both well clear of Benetton in third on 35 points.

Following the British Grand Prix on 13 July, the teams conducted testing sessions at the Autodromo Nazionale Monza from July 14–17. Shinji Nakano (Prost) set the fastest time on the first day, while Giancarlo Fisichella (Jordan) topped the second day's running. Johnny Herbert (Sauber) was fastest on the third day and Ralf Schumacher (Jordan) set the fastest time on the final day of running.

There was one driver change heading into the race. Having been in one of the two Benetton cars since the seventh race of the season at Canada, Alexander Wurz stood down from his role as race driver and was replaced by Gerhard Berger. Berger was forced to miss the previous three rounds due to a reoccurring sinus problem, requiring two operations.

On 22 July, four days before the event's first free practice sessions took place, Benetton confirmed the team would sign Fisichella for 1998, while the organisers of the German Grand Prix signed a deal with the Fédération Internationale de l'Automobile (FIA), to continue hosting the race until 2001.

=== Practice and qualifying ===
Four practice sessions were held before the Sunday race—two on Friday, and two on Saturday. The Friday morning and afternoon sessions each lasted an hour. The third and final practice sessions were held on Saturday morning and lasted 45 minutes. The two practice sessions were affected by occasionally damp and wet conditions, which made the track moderately slippery. Ralf Schumacher set the session's fastest time, with a lap of 1:46.196, one-tenth of a second quicker than Michael Schumacher.

Saturday's afternoon qualifying session lasted for an hour. Each driver was limited to twelve laps, with the grid order decided by the drivers' fastest laps. During this session, the 107% rule was in effect, which necessitated each driver set a time within 107% of the quickest lap to qualify for the race. Berger clinched the twelfth pole position of his career, and the first for the Benetton team since the 1995 Japanese Grand Prix with a time of 1:41.873. He said his lap time was "more or less" capable of what he could achieve and almost lost control of his Benetton on his final timed run before he spun at Sachs Kurve. Berger was joined on the front row of the grid by Fisichella who recorded a lap 0.023 seconds slower than Berger and felt he could have taken pole-position as he slid at Opel corner. Häkkinen qualified third and was satisfied with his performance; he was quicker than Berger in the first sector of the track but drove on at the Senna chicane and was delayed by Berger's spin. Michael Schumacher took fourth and experimented with a higher downforce set-up during the session. He was ahead of Frentzen in the faster of the two Williams and was afflicted with poor grip and balance. Alesi took sixth having spun his car in the final minute of the session. Ralf Schumacher braked late for the Ost chicane on his first timed run, and lost four-tenths of a second in the track's infield section during his next run and secured seventh overall. Coulthard managed eighth and spun off into the gravel trap at the turn 15 right-hand corner towards the end of the session. Villeneuve was afflicted with a 3 kilometres per hour (1.9 mph) straight-line speed deficit in his race car and switched to the spare Williams set up for Frentzen which was harder to handle and he was restricted to ninth. Irvine completed the top ten and reported his car ran badly over the kerbs lining the track but was confident he would have a more competitive Grand Prix.

=== Race ===
The drivers took to the track at 09:30 CEST (UTC+1) for a 30-minute warm-up session.

Giancarlo Fisichella took his first ever front-row start, and was challenging Berger for the win until he punctured a tyre on the debris of Rubens Barrichello's blown engine. This same incident had helped him gain the lead, as the smoke from the engine delayed Berger prior to his pit stop. Fisichella only led for two laps before Berger repassed him. After Fisichella broke down due to damage from the flailing tyre (caused while he tried to drive back to the pits), Michael Schumacher gave him a lift back to the pits after the race.

Jacques Villeneuve had a disastrous race, spinning off while trying to overtake rookie Jarno Trulli, thus losing championship ground to Schumacher. The latter's team-mate Eddie Irvine and Villeneuve's team-mate Heinz-Harald Frentzen collided at the first corner, with David Coulthard also forced out by damage from the incident.

Berger's last win would also be the last for Benetton, just as Berger's first win had been the team's first. It was also Benetton's only win as an Italian-licensed team, making Benetton the only team to have won races under more than one nationality, and the first win for an Italian constructor other than Ferrari since Maserati´s win at the 1957 German Grand Prix.

This was the last Grand Prix win for the Enstone-based Formula One team until the 2003 Hungarian Grand Prix, and, as of 2024, the last for an Austrian driver.

== Classification ==
=== Qualifying ===
Pos	No	Driver	Constructor	Time	Gap
1	8	(Austria) Gerhard Berger	Benetton-Renault	1:41.873	
2	12	(Italy) Giancarlo Fisichella	Jordan-Peugeot	1:41.896	+0.023
3	9	(Finland) Mika Häkkinen	McLaren-Mercedes	1:42.034	+0.161
4	5	(Germany) Michael Schumacher	Ferrari	1:42.181	+0.308
5	4	(Germany) Heinz-Harald Frentzen	Williams-Renault	1:42.421	+0.548
6	7	(France) Jean Alesi	Benetton-Renault	1:42.493	+0.620
7	11	(Germany) Ralf Schumacher	Jordan-Peugeot	1:42.498	+0.625
8	10	(United Kingdom) David Coulthard	McLaren-Mercedes	1:42.687	+0.814
9	3	(Canada) Jacques Villeneuve	Williams-Renault	1:42.967	+1.094
10	6	(United Kingdom) Eddie Irvine	Ferrari	1:43.209	+1.336
11	14	(Italy) Jarno Trulli	Prost-Mugen-Honda	1:43.226	+1.353
12	22	(Brazil) Rubens Barrichello	Stewart-Ford	1:43.272	+1.399
13	1	(United Kingdom) Damon Hill	Arrows-Yamaha	1:43.361	+1.488
14	16	(United Kingdom) Johnny Herbert	Sauber-Petronas	1:43.660	+1.787
15	23	(Denmark) Jan Magnussen	Stewart-Ford	1:43.927	+2.054
16	2	(Brazil) Pedro Diniz	Arrows-Yamaha	1:44.069	+2.196
17	15	(Japan) Shinji Nakano	Prost-Mugen-Honda	1:44.112	+2.239
18	17	(Argentina) Norberto Fontana	Sauber-Petronas	1:44.552	+2.679
19	19	(Finland) Mika Salo	Tyrrell-Ford	1:45.372	+3.499
20	18	(Netherlands) Jos Verstappen	Tyrrell-Ford	1:45.811	+3.938
21	21	(Brazil) Tarso Marques	Minardi-Hart	1:45.942	+4.069
22	20	(Japan) Ukyo Katayama	Minardi-Hart	1:46.499	+4.626
107% time: 1:49.004

=== Race ===
Pos	No	Driver	Constructor	Laps	Time/Retired	Grid	Points
1	8	(Austria) Gerhard Berger	Benetton-Renault	45	1:20:59.046	1	10
2	5	(Germany) Michael Schumacher	Ferrari	45	+17.527	4	6
3	9	(Finland) Mika Häkkinen	McLaren-Mercedes	45	+24.770	3	4
4	14	(Italy) Jarno Trulli	Prost-Mugen-Honda	45	+27.165	11	3
5	11	(Germany) Ralf Schumacher	Jordan-Peugeot	45	+29.995	7	2
6	7	(France) Jean Alesi	Benetton-Renault	45	+34.717	6	1
7	15	(Japan) Shinji Nakano	Prost-Mugen-Honda	45	+1:19.722	17	
8	1	(United Kingdom) Damon Hill	Arrows-Yamaha	44	+1 lap	13	
9	17	(Argentina) Norberto Fontana	Sauber-Petronas	44	+1 lap	18	
10	18	(Netherlands) Jos Verstappen	Tyrrell-Ford	44	+1 lap	20	
11	12	(Italy) Giancarlo Fisichella	Jordan-Peugeot	40	Radiator	2	
Ret	22	(Brazil) Rubens Barrichello	Stewart-Ford	33	Engine	12	
Ret	19	(Finland) Mika Salo	Tyrrell-Ford	33	Clutch	19	
Ret	3	(Canada) Jacques Villeneuve	Williams-Renault	33	Spun off	9	
Ret	23	(Denmark) Jan Magnussen	Stewart-Ford	27	Engine	15	
Ret	20	(Japan) Ukyo Katayama	Minardi-Hart	23	Out of fuel	22	
Ret	16	(United Kingdom) Johnny Herbert	Sauber-Petronas	8	Collision	14	
Ret	2	(Brazil) Pedro Diniz	Arrows-Yamaha	8	Collision	16	
Ret	10	(United Kingdom) David Coulthard	McLaren-Mercedes	1	Transmission	8	
Ret	4	(Germany) Heinz-Harald Frentzen	Williams-Renault	1	Collision	5	
Ret	6	(United Kingdom) Eddie Irvine	Ferrari	1	Collision	10	
Ret	21	(Brazil) Tarso Marques	Minardi-Hart	0	Gearbox	21	

== Championship standings after the race ==
Drivers' Championship standings

Pos	Driver	Points
1	(Germany) Michael Schumacher	53
2	(Canada) Jacques Villeneuve	43
3	(France) Jean Alesi	22
4	(Austria) Gerhard Berger	20
5	(Germany) Heinz-Harald Frentzen	19

Constructors' Championship standings

Pos	Constructor	Points
1	(Italy) Ferrari	71
2	(United Kingdom) Williams-Renault	62
3	(Italy) Benetton-Renault	46
4	(United Kingdom) McLaren-Mercedes	28
5	(France) Prost-Mugen-Honda	19

- Note: Only the top five positions are included for both sets of standings.

Previous race: 1997 British Grand Prix	FIA Formula One World Championship; 1997 season	Next race: 1997 Hungarian Grand Prix
Previous race: 1996 German Grand Prix	German Grand Prix	Next race: 1998 German Grand Prix
