= 1997 Monaco Grand Prix =

Formula One race

Coordinates: 43°44′4.74″N 7°25′16.8″E

Race 5 of 17 in the 1997 Formula One World Championship
← Previous race	Next race →

Race details
- Date: 11 May 1997
- Official name: LV Grand Prix de Monaco
- Location: Circuit de Monaco; Monte Carlo, Monaco
- Course: Temporary street circuit
- Course length: 3.36 km (2.08 miles)
- Distance: 62 laps, 207.08 km (128.96 miles)
- Scheduled distance: 78 laps, 260.52 km (162.24 miles)
- Weather: Overcast, cold and rain, air temperature 11 °C (52 °F)

Pole position
Driver	(Germany) Heinz-Harald Frentzen	Williams-Renault
- Time: 1:18.216

Fastest lap
Driver	(Germany) Michael Schumacher	Ferrari
- Time: 1:53.315 on lap 26

Podium
First	(Germany) Michael Schumacher	Ferrari
Second	(Brazil) Rubens Barrichello	Stewart-Ford
Third	(United Kingdom) Eddie Irvine	Ferrari

The 1997 Monaco Grand Prix (formally the LV Grand Prix de Monaco) was a Formula One race held on 11 May 1997 at the Circuit de Monaco, Monte Carlo. It was the fifth race of the 1997 Formula One World Championship. The 62-lap race was won by Michael Schumacher, driving a Ferrari, after starting from second position. Rubens Barrichello finished second in a Stewart-Ford, with Eddie Irvine third in the other Ferrari.

Heinz-Harald Frentzen, driving a Williams-Renault, started from pole position ahead of Schumacher. Frentzen and teammate Jacques Villeneuve made poor starts, and both retired from the race in separate accidents. Schumacher won by some 53 seconds from Barrichello, who scored the first podium for the Stewart team in only their fifth Grand Prix. The race had been scheduled for 78 laps, but rainy conditions meant that only 62 laps were run before the two-hour time limit was reached.

The win enabled Schumacher to take over the lead of the Drivers' Championship from Villeneuve, and Ferrari to move ahead of Williams in the Constructors' Championship.

== Background ==
Heading into this race, the fifth of the 1997 season, Williams driver Jacques Villeneuve led the Drivers' Championship with 20 points, followed by Ferrari driver Michael Schumacher on 14. Behind them were five drivers on 10 points each: Villeneuve's teammate Heinz-Harald Frentzen, McLaren driver David Coulthard, Schumacher's teammate Eddie Irvine, Benetton driver Gerhard Berger, and Coulthard's teammate Mika Häkkinen. In the Constructors' Championship, Williams led with 30 points, followed by Ferrari on 24 and McLaren on 20.

== Qualifying report ==
Qualifying saw Frentzen take pole position in his Williams by just 0.019 seconds from Michael Schumacher's Ferrari, with Villeneuve third in the other Williams, a further 0.3 seconds back. It was Frentzen's first pole position in Formula One. The Jordans of Giancarlo Fisichella and Ralf Schumacher were fourth and sixth respectively, with Coulthard's McLaren between them. Completing the top ten were Johnny Herbert's Sauber, Häkkinen in the other McLaren, Jean Alesi's Benetton, and Rubens Barrichello's Stewart. Further down the grid, Irvine could only manage 15th in the other Ferrari.

=== Qualifying classification ===
Pos	No	Driver	Constructor	Time	Gap
1	4	(Germany) Heinz-Harald Frentzen	Williams-Renault	1:18.216	
2	5	(Germany) Michael Schumacher	Ferrari	1:18.235	+0.019
3	3	(Canada) Jacques Villeneuve	Williams-Renault	1:18.583	+0.367
4	12	(Italy) Giancarlo Fisichella	Jordan-Peugeot	1:18.665	+0.449
5	10	(United Kingdom) David Coulthard	McLaren-Mercedes	1:18.779	+0.563
6	11	(Germany) Ralf Schumacher	Jordan-Peugeot	1:18.943	+0.727
7	16	(United Kingdom) Johnny Herbert	Sauber-Petronas	1:19.105	+0.889
8	9	(Finland) Mika Häkkinen	McLaren-Mercedes	1:19.119	+0.903
9	7	(France) Jean Alesi	Benetton-Renault	1:19.263	+1.047
10	22	(Brazil) Rubens Barrichello	Stewart-Ford	1:19.295	+1.079
11	17	(Italy) Nicola Larini	Sauber-Petronas	1:19.468	+1.252
12	14	(France) Olivier Panis	Prost-Mugen-Honda	1:19.626	+1.410
13	1	(United Kingdom) Damon Hill	Arrows-Yamaha	1:19.674	+1.458
14	19	(Finland) Mika Salo	Tyrrell-Ford	1:19.694	+1.478
15	6	(United Kingdom) Eddie Irvine	Ferrari	1:19.723	+1.507
16	2	(Brazil) Pedro Diniz	Arrows-Yamaha	1:19.860	+1.644
17	8	(Austria) Gerhard Berger	Benetton-Renault	1:20.199	+1.983
18	21	(Italy) Jarno Trulli	Minardi-Hart	1:20.349	+2.133
19	23	(Denmark) Jan Magnussen	Stewart-Ford	1:20.516	+2.300
20	20	(Japan) Ukyo Katayama	Minardi-Hart	1:20.606	+2.390
21	15	(Japan) Shinji Nakano	Prost-Mugen-Honda	1:20.961	+2.745
22	18	(Netherlands) Jos Verstappen	Tyrrell-Ford	1:21.290	+3.074
107% time: 1:23.691

== Race report ==
The warm-up session was dry, with Williams taking first and second places. About 30 minutes before the start, however, rain began to fall; Williams decided to run both cars with dry tyres, thinking the weather would improve, while Michael Schumacher set the car for intermediate weather conditions. During the warm up lap, the weather worsened, and at the start, Schumacher was quickest. He led by 22 seconds on lap 5. Behind him the Jordans of Fisichella and Ralf Schumacher, which both had the car set for rain, took second and third spots, until they were both passed by Barrichello's Stewart, who benefited from the Bridgestone wet tyres, which were better than Goodyear's under those conditions.

The start of the race was catastrophic for the Arrows team, as Pedro Diniz, who had opted to start the race on slick tyres, spun out after the hairpin on the opening lap, while his teammate Damon Hill was involved in a collision with Irvine's Ferrari on the second lap, breaking his suspension. Both McLarens also retired on lap two as Coulthard hit the wall exiting the tunnel, and Häkkinen ran into the back of Alesi's Benetton as they passed Coulthard's car.

Both Willams drivers went out of the race after they had to pit to change their tyres. Villeneuve hit a wall on lap 17, while Frentzen hit a barrier at the chicane on lap 39. Schumacher continued to build his lead until he had about 30 seconds advantage over Barrichello; then he backed off and began to maintain the gap. He made an error on lap 53 at the Sainte Devote corner, going down the escape road and losing 10 seconds, but did not lose his lead. Only 62 of the scheduled 78 laps were run as the two-hour time limit was reached, and Schumacher won with a 53-second margin over Barrichello. Irvine finished third after overtaking Olivier Panis, exacting some measure of revenge for Panis' overtaking manoeuvre that had seen him get past Irvine a year earlier. After losing third place to Irvine, Panis backed off in the closing stages and settled for fourth place. Mika Salo finished fifth despite denting his front wing on debris left from Häkkinen's accident early on, and also despite not making a single pit stop during the race. He also took Tyrrel's last points. Fisichella, who at one point was running as high as second place, finished in sixth. The race was the first win for a Ferrari driver at Monaco since the 1981 running of the race.

On the podium, the flag displayed for Eddie Irvine was that of the Republic of Ireland, instead of the Union Jack of the United Kingdom (Irvine being from Northern Ireland, a country within the UK). This was due to a complication regarding the Superlicence that a driver is required to have in order to race in Formula One (Irvine's licence having been issued by an office in Dublin, thus resulting in the Irish tricolour being flown).

This was the final F1 race for Sauber driver Nicola Larini.

=== Race classification ===
Pos	No	Driver	Constructor	Tyre	Laps	Time/Retired	Grid	Points
1	5	(Germany) Michael Schumacher	Ferrari	G	62	2:00:05.654	2	10
2	22	(Brazil) Rubens Barrichello	Stewart-Ford	B	62	+ 53.306	10	6
3	6	(United Kingdom) Eddie Irvine	Ferrari	G	62	+ 1:22.108	15	4
4	14	(France) Olivier Panis	Prost-Mugen-Honda	B	62	+ 1:44.402	12	3
5	19	(Finland) Mika Salo	Tyrrell-Ford	G	61	+ 1 lap	14	2
6	12	(Italy) Giancarlo Fisichella	Jordan-Peugeot	G	61	+ 1 lap	4	1
7	23	(Denmark) Jan Magnussen	Stewart-Ford	B	61	+ 1 lap	19	
8	18	(Netherlands) Jos Verstappen	Tyrrell-Ford	G	60	+ 2 laps	22	
9	8	(Austria) Gerhard Berger	Benetton-Renault	G	60	+ 2 laps	17	
10	20	(Japan) Ukyo Katayama	Minardi-Hart	B	60	+ 2 laps	20	
Ret	4	(Germany) Heinz-Harald Frentzen	Williams-Renault	G	39	Accident	1	
Ret	15	(Japan) Shinji Nakano	Prost-Mugen-Honda	B	36	Accident	21	
Ret	17	(Italy) Nicola Larini	Sauber-Petronas	G	24	Accident	11	
Ret	7	(France) Jean Alesi	Benetton-Renault	G	16	Spun off	9	
Ret	3	(Canada) Jacques Villeneuve	Williams-Renault	G	16	Accident damage	3	
Ret	11	(Germany) Ralf Schumacher	Jordan-Peugeot	G	10	Accident	6	
Ret	16	(United Kingdom) Johnny Herbert	Sauber-Petronas	G	9	Accident	7	
Ret	21	(Italy) Jarno Trulli	Minardi-Hart	B	7	Accident	18	
Ret	10	(United Kingdom) David Coulthard	McLaren-Mercedes	G	1	Accident	5	
Ret	9	(Finland) Mika Häkkinen	McLaren-Mercedes	G	1	Collision	8	
Ret	1	(United Kingdom) Damon Hill	Arrows-Yamaha	B	1	Collision	13	
Ret	2	(Brazil) Pedro Diniz	Arrows-Yamaha	B	0	Spun off	16	

== Notes ==
- Last points for a V8-powered car until the 2006 Bahrain Grand Prix.

== Championship standings after the race ==
Drivers' Championship standings

Pos	Driver	Points
1	(Germany) Michael Schumacher	24
2	(Canada) Jacques Villeneuve	20
3	(United Kingdom) Eddie Irvine	14
4	(Germany) Heinz-Harald Frentzen	10
5	(United Kingdom) David Coulthard	10

Constructors' Championship standings

Pos	Constructor	Points
1	(Italy) Ferrari	38
2	(United Kingdom) Williams-Renault	30
3	(United Kingdom) McLaren-Mercedes	20
4	(Italy) Benetton-Renault	13
5	(France) Prost-Mugen-Honda	9

- Note: Only the top five positions are included for both sets of standings.

Previous race: 1997 San Marino Grand Prix	FIA Formula One World Championship; 1997 season	Next race: 1997 Spanish Grand Prix
Previous race: 1996 Monaco Grand Prix	Monaco Grand Prix	Next race: 1998 Monaco Grand Prix
