= 2010 BOSS GP Series =

Car racing championship

Seasons
- ← 2009 2011 →

The 2010 BOSS GP Series was the 16th season of the premier championship for retired open-wheel racing cars and the 1st season of the BOSS GP series after it was founded by ex-EuroBOSS drivers Henk de Boer, Frits van Eerd, Marijn van Kalmthout and Klaas Zwart. The championship began on 17 April at the Hockenheimring and ended on 3 October at Dijon-Prenois.

== Teams and Drivers ==
Team	Chassis	Engine	No.	Driver	Rounds
Open Class
(Netherlands) De Boer Manx	Panoz DP01	Cosworth XFE 2.6 L V8	1	(Netherlands) Henk de Boer	All
(Netherlands) Van Kalmthout Racing	Benetton B197	Judd GV 4.0 L V10	2	(Netherlands) Marijn van Kalmthout	All
(United Kingdom) Team Ascari	Benetton B197	Judd GV 4.0 L V10	3	(Netherlands) Klaas Zwart	All
(United Kingdom) Team Ascari	Benetton B197	Judd GV 4.0 L V10	4	(Netherlands) Henk Thuis	3
(United Kingdom) Team Ascari	Benetton B196	Judd GV 4.0 L V10	4	(Denmark) Johnny Laursen	1–2
(Netherlands) Tyrrell F1 Team Holland	Tyrrell 026	Ford JD Zetec-R 3.0 L V10	5	(Netherlands) Frits van Eerd	3
	Tyrrell 023	Yamaha OX10C 3.0 L V10	6	(United Kingdom) Scott Mansell	7
	Tyrrell 023	Yamaha OX10C 3.0 L V10	16	(Brazil) Abba Kogan	1–2, 7
(Germany) Top Speed	Dallara GP2/05	Mecachrome V8108 4.0 L V8	8	(Austria) Ingo Gerstl	2–3, 5–7
(Austria) GP Racing	Panoz DP01	Cosworth XFE 2.6 L V8	11	(Austria) Peter Milavec	2–3
(Germany) Ryschka Motorsport	G-Force GF05	Chevrolet Indy V8 3.5 L V8	12	(France) Philippe Bourgeois	1–2
(Germany) Ryschka Motorsport	G-Force GF05	Chevrolet Indy V8 3.5 L V8	12	(Netherlands) Peter Versluis	3
(Germany) Ryschka Motorsport	G-Force GF05	Chevrolet Indy V8 3.5 L V8	30	(Netherlands) Cor Euser	3–4
(Germany) Rennwerk	Arrows A21	Supertec FB02 3.0 L V10	13	(Germany) Arnold Wagner	1, 3
(United Kingdom) Woodcock Racing	Arrows A21	Supertec FB02 3.0 L V10	14	(United Kingdom) Michael Woodcock	1
(United Kingdom) Woodcock Racing	Arrows A22	Asiatech 001 3.0 L V10	15	(United Kingdom) Gary Woodcock	1
	Coloni C4	Cosworth DFR 4.0 L V8	18	(Netherlands) Xavier Maassen	3
(United Kingdom) Griffith's	Benetton B192	Ford HBA7 3.5 L V8	20	(France) Patrick d'Aubreby	4
Masters Class
(Germany) Becker Motorsport	Dallara SN01	Renault VQ35DE 3.5 L V6	21	(Germany) Karl-Heinz Becker	2–7
	Dallara SN01	Renault VQ35DE 3.5 L V6	22	(Portugal) Carlos Tavares	All
(Germany) Top Speed	Dallara T05	Renault VQ35DE 3.5 L V6	23	(Austria) Ingo Gerstl	1
(Germany) Top Speed	Dallara SN01	Renault VQ35DE 3.5 L V6	24	(Austria) Norbert Gruber	1–3, 6
	Dallara SN01	Renault VQ35DE 3.5 L V6	25	(Bulgaria) Vladimir Arabadzhiev	1
(Germany) Helge Schneider Racing	Reynard 91D	Mugen MF308 3.0 L V8	28	(Germany) Henry Buettner	1, 3, 6
	Reynard 91D	Mugen MF308 3.0 L V8	30	(Switzerland) Jean-Claude Monbaron	1–2, 4, 7
	Reynard 91D	Mugen MF308 3.0 L V8	32	(Republic of Ireland) Dan Daly	2
	Chevron B24	Chevrolet small block 5.0 L V8	32	(United Kingdom) Greg Thornton	5
(Austria) Zele Racing	Dallara SN01	Renault VQ35DE 3.5 L V6	33	(France) Damien Charveriat	3, 5
(Austria) Zele Racing	Dallara SN01	Renault VQ35DE 3.5 L V6	50	(Germany) Peter Randlshofer	1, 3
(Germany) Ryschka Motorsport	Lola T89/00 HU09; Lola T89/00 HU29	Cosworth DFS 2.6 L V8	65	(Belgium) Alain DeBlandre	All

== Race results ==
Round		Circuit	Date	Pole position	Fastest lap	Winning driver	Winning team	Masters Class Winner
1	R1	(Germany) Hockenheimring, Hockenheim	17 April	(Netherlands) Marijn van Kalmthout	(Netherlands) Klaas Zwart	(Netherlands) Klaas Zwart	(United Kingdom) Team Ascari	(Austria) Ingo Gerstl
1	R2	(Germany) Hockenheimring, Hockenheim	18 April		(Netherlands) Klaas Zwart	(Netherlands) Klaas Zwart	(United Kingdom) Team Ascari	(Austria) Ingo Gerstl
2	R3	(Belgium) Circuit de Spa-Francorchamps, Stavelot	22 May	(Netherlands) Klaas Zwart	(Netherlands) Marijn van Kalmthout	(Netherlands) Klaas Zwart	(United Kingdom) Team Ascari	(Belgium) Alain DeBlandre
2	R4	(Belgium) Circuit de Spa-Francorchamps, Stavelot	23 May		(Netherlands) Klaas Zwart	(Netherlands) Klaas Zwart	(United Kingdom) Team Ascari	(Republic of Ireland) Dan Daly
3	R5	(Netherlands) Circuit Zandvoort, Zandvoort	5 June	(Netherlands) Marijn van Kalmthout	(Netherlands) Marijn van Kalmthout	(Netherlands) Klaas Zwart	(United Kingdom) Team Ascari	(Germany) Karl-Heinz Becker
3	R6	(Netherlands) Circuit Zandvoort, Zandvoort	6 June		(Netherlands) Klaas Zwart	(Netherlands) Klaas Zwart	(United Kingdom) Team Ascari	(Germany) Karl-Heinz Becker
4	R7	(Germany) Nürburgring, Nürburg	19 June	(Netherlands) Klaas Zwart	(Netherlands) Klaas Zwart	(Netherlands) Klaas Zwart	(United Kingdom) Team Ascari	(Germany) Karl-Heinz Becker
4	R8	(Germany) Nürburgring, Nürburg	20 June		(Netherlands) Klaas Zwart	(Netherlands) Klaas Zwart	(United Kingdom) Team Ascari	(Germany) Karl-Heinz Becker
5	R9	(Belgium) Circuit Zolder, Heusden-Zolder	18 July	(Netherlands) Marijn van Kalmthout	(Netherlands) Marijn van Kalmthout	(Netherlands) Marijn van Kalmthout	(Netherlands) Van Kalmthout Racing	(Germany) Karl-Heinz Becker
5	R10	(Belgium) Circuit Zolder, Heusden-Zolder	18 July		(Netherlands) Marijn van Kalmthout	(Netherlands) Marijn van Kalmthout	(Netherlands) Van Kalmthout Racing	(Germany) Karl-Heinz Becker
6	R11	(Netherlands) TT Circuit Assen, Assen	18 September	(Netherlands) Klaas Zwart	(Netherlands) Marijn van Kalmthout	(Netherlands) Marijn van Kalmthout	(Netherlands) Van Kalmthout Racing	(Germany) Karl-Heinz Becker
6	R12	(Netherlands) TT Circuit Assen, Assen	19 September		(Netherlands) Marijn van Kalmthout	(Netherlands) Marijn van Kalmthout	(Netherlands) Van Kalmthout Racing	(Germany) Karl-Heinz Becker
7	R13	(France) Dijon-Prenois, Prenois	2 October	(United Kingdom) Scott Mansell	(Netherlands) Klaas Zwart	(Netherlands) Klaas Zwart	(United Kingdom) Team Ascari	(Belgium) Alain DeBlandre
7	R14	(France) Dijon-Prenois, Prenois	3 October		(Netherlands) Klaas Zwart	(Netherlands) Klaas Zwart	(United Kingdom) Team Ascari	(Germany) Karl-Heinz Becker

== Championship standings ==
=== Drivers Standings ===
Pos	Driver	HOC (Germany)		SPA (Belgium)		ZAN (Netherlands)		NÜR (Germany)		ZOL (Belgium)		ASS (Netherlands)		DIJ (France)		Points
Open Class
1	(Netherlands) Klaas Zwart	1	1	**1**	1	1	1	**1**	1	Ret	Ret	**2**	3	1	1	234
2	(Netherlands) Marijn van Kalmthout	**8**	7	2	2	**11**	2	4	2	**1**	1	1	1	4	2	221
3	(Netherlands) Henk de Boer	3	2	5	3	5	5	2	4	3	3	4	4	3	4	208
4	(Austria) Ingo Gerstl			4	4	7	7			2	2	3	2	Ret	DNS	156
5	(Netherlands) Cor Euser					4	4	5	5							52
6	(Germany) Arnold Wagner	2	DNS			3	3									50
7	(Brazil) Abba Kagon	6	3	6	DNS										3	49
8	(France) Philippe Bourgeois	7	4	7	5											44
9	(Denmark) Johnny Laursen	5	5	8	6											42
10	(Austria) Peter Milavec			3	7	8	9									40
11	(France) Patrick d'Aubreby							3	3							32
12	(Netherlands) Frits van Eerd					2	Ret									24
13	(United Kingdom) Michael Woodcock	4	6													24
14	(Netherlands) Henk Thuis					6	6									20
15	(United Kingdom) Scott Mansell													**2**		18
16	(Netherlands) Peter Versluis					9	8									15
17	(United Kingdom) Gary Woodcock	9	8													15
18	(Netherlands) Xavier Maassen					10	DNS									5
Masters Class
1	(Germany) Karl-Heinz Becker			5	2	**1**	1	**1**	1	1	1	**1**	1	**2**	1	228
2	(Portugal) Carlos Antunes Tavares Dias	2	2	2	3	3	3	DNS	3	3	3	2	2	3	2	220
3	(Belgium) Alain DeBlandre	4	4	1	**4**	4	DNS	2	2	4	Ret	4	4	1	3	208
4	(Austria) Norbert Gruber	5	5	4	5	7	Ret					Ret	3			122
5	(Switzerland) Jean-Claude Monbaron	6	6	3	6			3	Ret					Ret	4	88
6	(Germany) Henry Buettner	7	7			5	4					3	Ret			79
7	(France) Damien Charveriat					2	2			**2**	2					72
8	(Germany) Peter Randlshofer	3	3			6	5									52
9	(Republic of Ireland) Dan Daly			**6**	1											30
10	(Austria) Ingo Gerstl	**1**	1													0
11	(United Kingdom) Greg Thornton									Ret	DNS					0
12	(Bulgaria) Vladimir Arabadzhiev	DNS	DNS													0
Pos	Driver	HOC (Germany)		SPA (Belgium)		ZAN (Netherlands)		NÜR (Germany)		ZOL (Belgium)		ASS (Netherlands)		DIJ (France)		Points

Key
Colour	Result
Gold	Winner
Silver	Second place
Bronze	Third place
Green	Other points position
Blue	Other classified position
Blue	Not classified, finished (NC)
Purple	Not classified, retired (Ret)
Red	Did not qualify (DNQ)
Red	Did not pre-qualify (DNPQ)
Black	Disqualified (DSQ)
White	Did not start (DNS)
White	Race cancelled (C)
Blank	Did not practice (DNP)
Blank	Excluded (EX)
Blank	Did not arrive (DNA)
Blank	Withdrawn (WD)
Blank	Did not enter (cell empty)
Text formatting	Meaning
**Bold**	Pole position
Italics	Fastest lap
