= Benetton B197 =

Formula One racing car

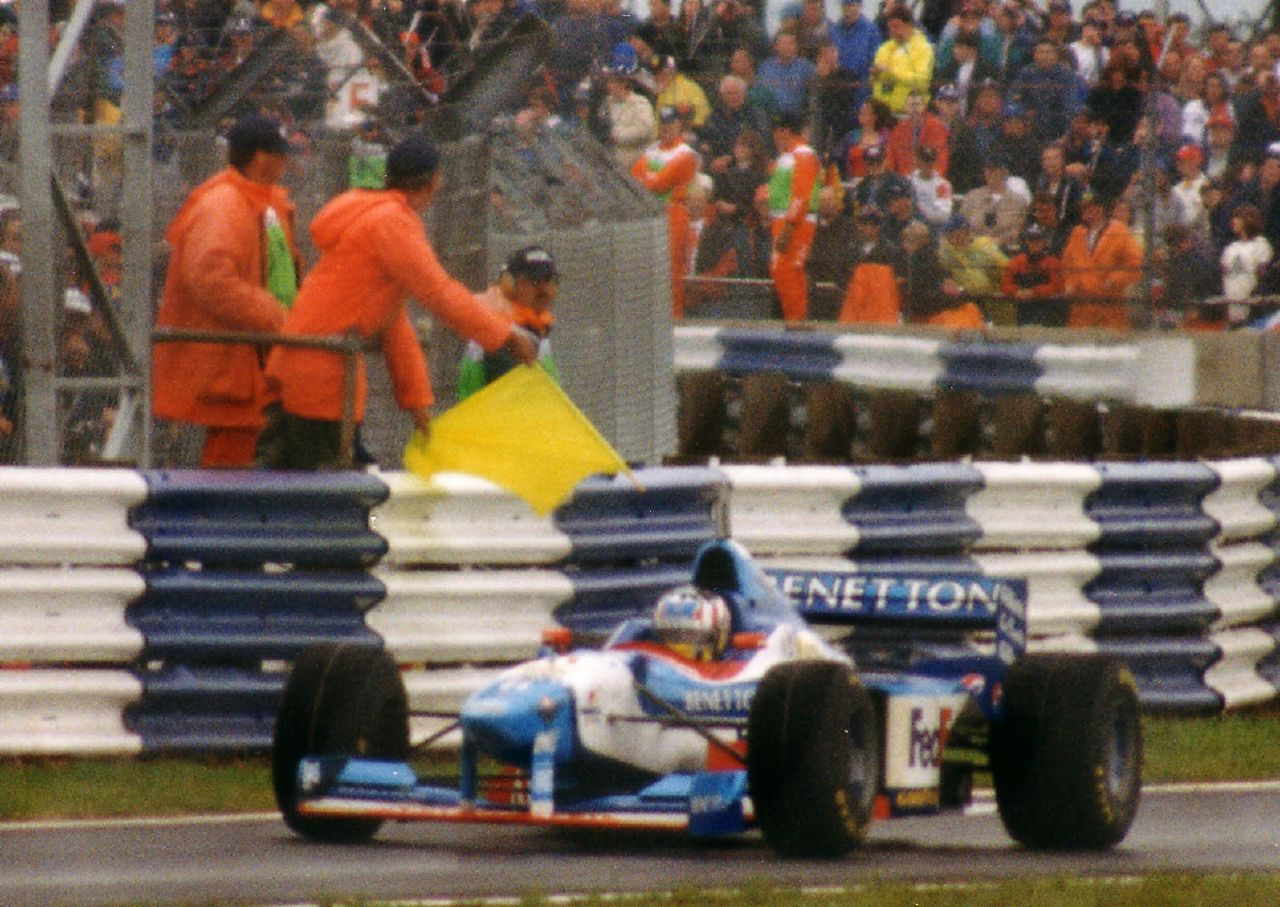
- Alexander Wurz driving the B197 at the 1997 British Grand Prix
- Category: Formula One
- Constructor: Benetton
- Designers: Pat Symonds (Technical Director); Rory Byrne (Chief Designer); Nick Wirth (Assistant Chief Designer); Nikolas Tombazis (Head of Aerodynamics); Bernard Dudot (Chief Engine Designer - Renault)
- Predecessor: B196
- Successor: B198

Technical specifications
- Chassis: carbon-fibre and honeycomb composite structure
- Suspension (front): double wishbones, pushrod, triple damper
- Suspension (rear): double wishbones, pushrod, double damper
- Engine: Renault RS9/RS9A/RS9B, 71° V10
- Transmission: Benetton six-speed longitudinal sequential semi-automatic
- Power: 730-755 hp @ 17,000 rpm
- Fuel: Agip
- Tyres: Goodyear

Competition history
- Notable entrants: Mild Seven Benetton Renault
- Notable drivers: 7. (France) Jean Alesi; 8. (Austria) Gerhard Berger; 8. (Austria) Alexander Wurz
- Debut: 1997 Australian Grand Prix
- First win: 1997 German Grand Prix
- Last win: 1997 German Grand Prix
- Last event: 1997 European Grand Prix
Races	Wins	Podiums	Poles	F/Laps
17	1	8	2	2
- Constructors' Championships: 0
- Drivers' Championships: 0

The Benetton B197 is a Formula One racing car with which the Benetton team competed in the 1997 Formula One World Championship. There it was driven by Frenchman Jean Alesi and Austrian Gerhard Berger, who were both in their second season with the team. However, Berger was forced to sit out three races in the middle of the season due to sinus problems, and compatriot Alexander Wurz made his F1 début by deputising for him, starting at the Canadian Grand Prix.

== Overview ==
The car is a further development of the previous year's B196, from which both drivers had struggled to extract maximum performance. The B197 proved competitive at nearly every race, but only scored one win, courtesy of Berger on his return to the cockpit in Germany. The main problem with the car was its inability to bring its tyres up to temperature on low-grip circuits, particularly in qualifying. However, Berger and Alesi did secure one pole position each during the course of the season. By the end of the season, it was clear that Benetton would adopt a new driver line-up for 1998, with Berger retiring and Alesi moving to Sauber.

The team eventually finished third in the Constructors' Championship, with 67 points.

The Benetton B197 was the last Benetton Formula 1 car to utilize fully-fledged Renault engines until the B201 in 2001 season due to the company's repositioning to privatisation plan.

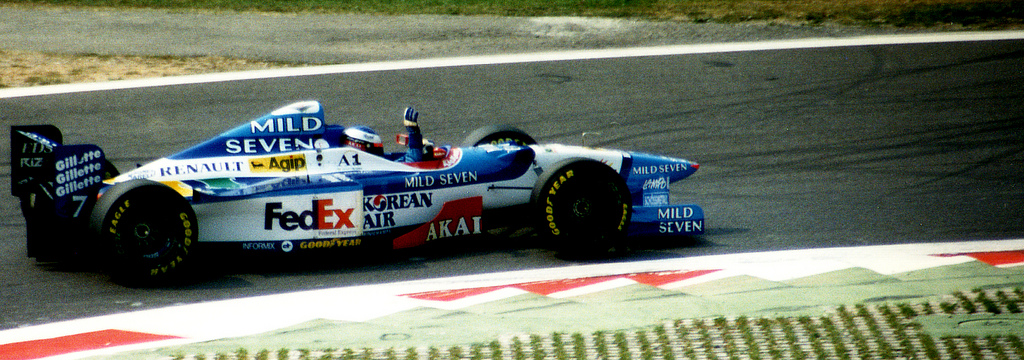
Jean Alesi driving the B197 at the 1997 Italian Grand Prix

== Sponsorship and livery ==
The B197 was still painted in white and blue with additional red accents from a new sponsor Akai. FedEx and Gillette also joined the team.

Benetton used the Mild Seven logos, except at the French, British and German Grands Prix.

== BOSS GP ==
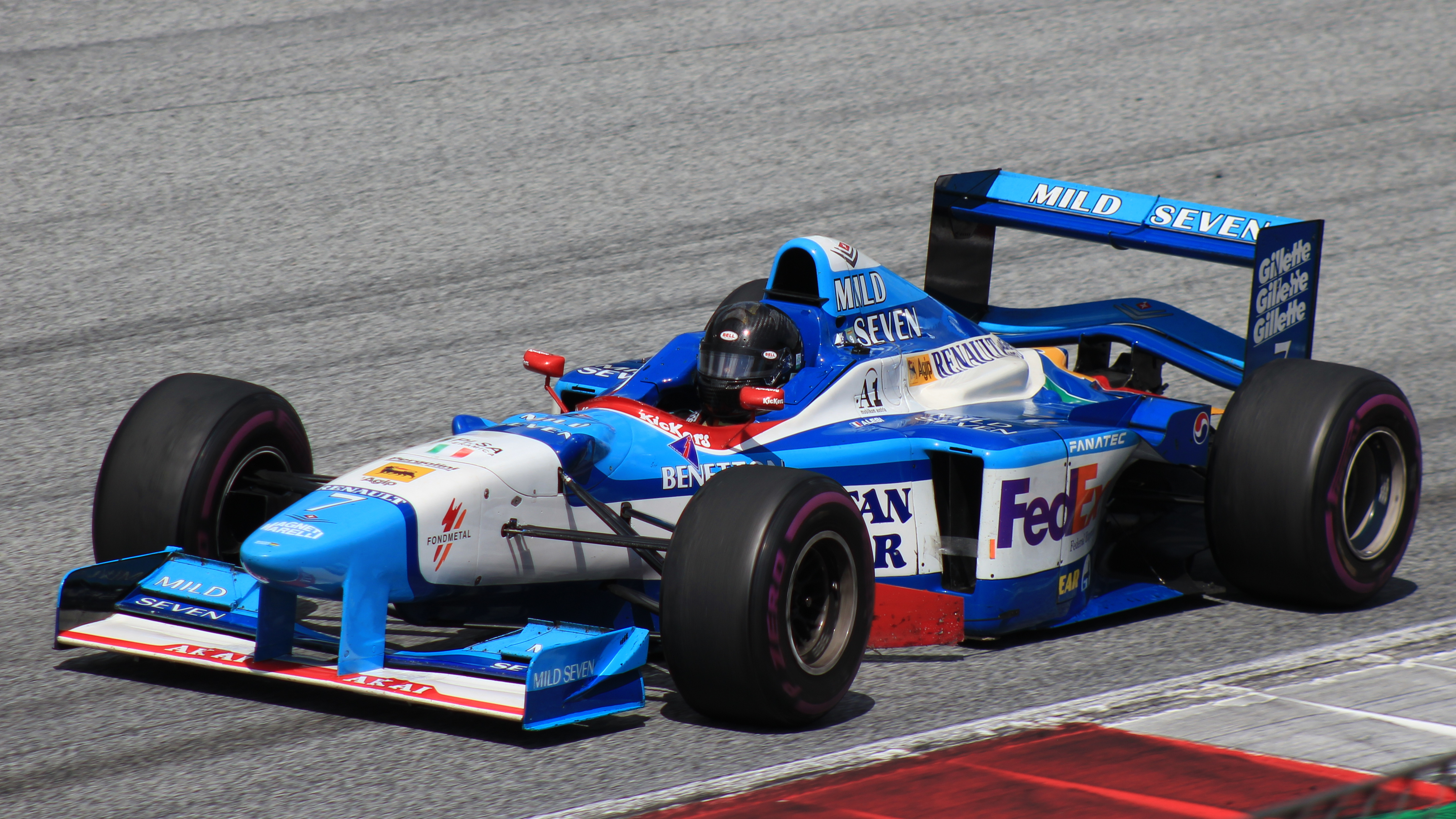
Ulf Ehninger driving the B197 at the Red Bull Ring

The B197 was still currently active in the BOSS GP, winning the Open class title in 2003, 2004, 2006, 2007, 2010, 2011, 2021, 2024 and 2025. The original Renault engine were swapped out with a Judd engine.

== Complete Formula One results ==
(key) (results in bold indicate pole position; results in italics indicate fastest lap)

Year	Entrant	Engine	Tyres	Drivers	1	2	3	4	5	6	7	8	9	10	11	12	13	14	15	16	17	Points	WCC
1997	Mild Seven Benetton Renault	Renault V10	**G**		AUS	BRA	ARG	SMR	MON	ESP	CAN	FRA	GBR	GER	HUN	BEL	ITA	AUT	LUX	JPN	EUR	**67**	**3rd**
1997	Mild Seven Benetton Renault	Renault V10	**G**	Jean Alesi	Ret	6	7	5	Ret	3	2	5	2	6	11	8	**2**	Ret	2	5	13	**67**	**3rd**
1997	Mild Seven Benetton Renault	Renault V10	**G**	Gerhard Berger	4	2	6	Ret	9	10				**1**	8	6	7	10	4	8	4	**67**	**3rd**
1997	Mild Seven Benetton Renault	Renault V10	**G**	Alexander Wurz							Ret	Ret	3									**67**	**3rd**
