= Benetton B195 =

Formula One racing car

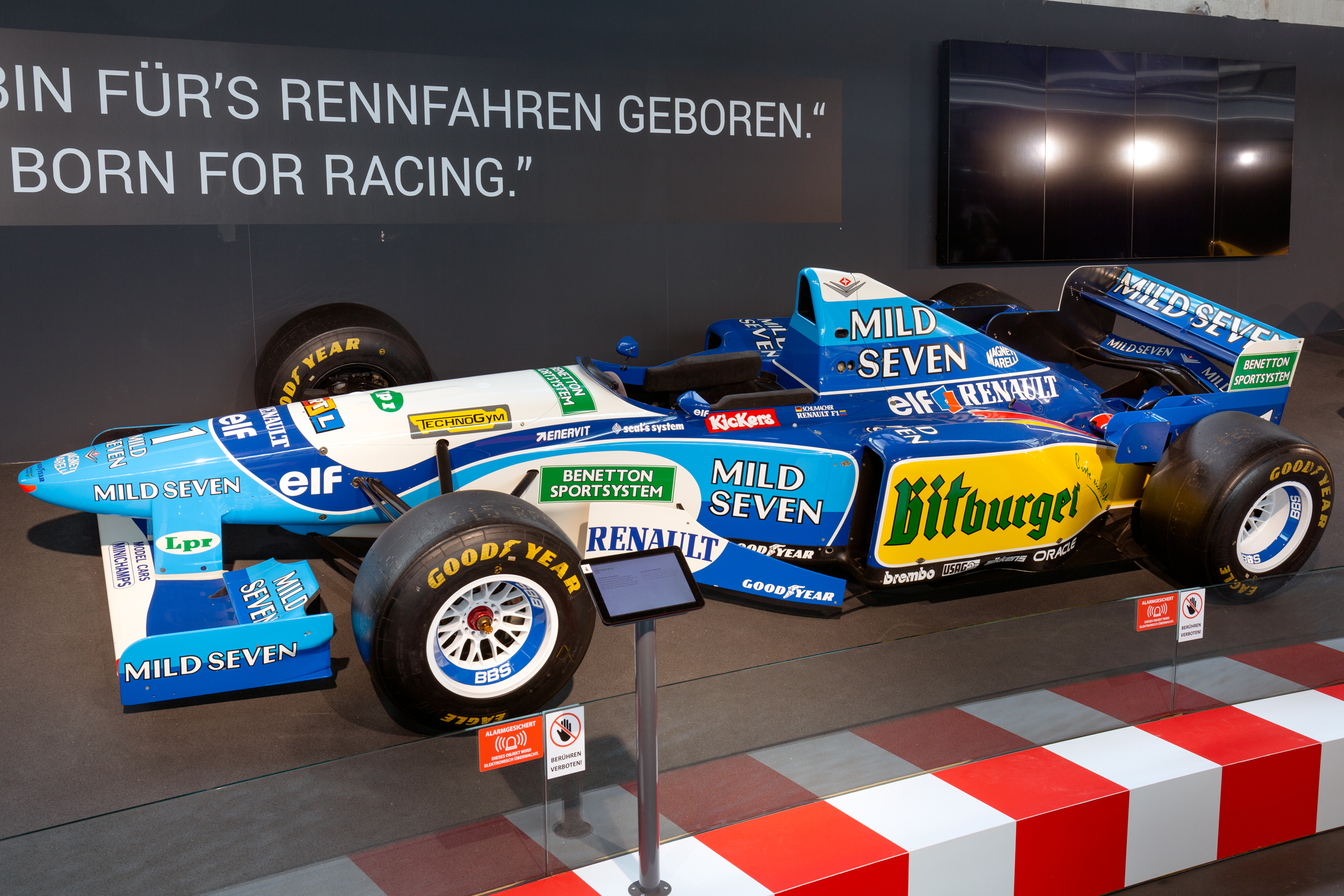
- Michael Schumacher's Benetton B195 on display at the Michael Schumacher Private Collection
- Category: Formula One
- Constructor: Benetton Formula Ltd.
- Designers: Ross Brawn (Technical Director); Rory Byrne (Chief Designer); Pat Symonds (Head of R&D); Nikolas Tombazis (Head of Aerodynamics); Bernard Dudot (Chief Engine Designer) (Renault)
- Predecessor: B194
- Successor: B196

Technical specifications
- Chassis: Carbon fibre monocoque
- Suspension (front): Double wishbone, pushrod
- Suspension (rear): Double wishbone, pushrod
- Engine: Renault RS7, 3,000 cc (183.1 cu in), 67° V10, NA, mid-engine, longitudinally-mounted
- Transmission: Benetton transverse 6-speed semi-automatic
- Power: 675–700 bhp (503–522 kW; 684–710 PS) @ 15,200-15,600 rpm
- Fuel: Elf
- Tyres: Goodyear

Competition history
- Notable entrants: Mild Seven Benetton Renault
- Notable drivers: 1. (Germany) Michael Schumacher; 2. (United Kingdom) Johnny Herbert
- Debut: 1995 Brazilian Grand Prix
- First win: 1995 Brazilian Grand Prix
- Last win: 1995 Japanese Grand Prix
- Last event: 1995 Australian Grand Prix
Races	Wins	Podiums	Poles	F/Laps
17	11	15	4	8
- Constructors' Championships: 1 (1995)
- Drivers' Championships: 1 (1995, Michael Schumacher)

The Benetton B195 is a Formula One racing car designed by Rory Byrne and Ross Brawn for use by the Benetton team in the 1995 Formula One World Championship.

== Overview ==
On 23 August 1994, Renault announced they would be a works engine supplier to the Benetton Formula team that included free engines and factory support. The B195 is similar to its predecessor, the B194, but a change of engine supplier from Ford to Renault resulted in a redesign of the engine installation, gearbox and rear suspension. The car was powered by the same factory Renault RS7 V10 engine used by Benetton's rivals, Williams, in their FW17. Being less stable than the FW17, the B195 was seen by most paddock insiders as inferior to its rival. The B195 was said to be very twitchy to drive and Michael Schumacher was quite critical of the car, saying it was only fast when driven on the edge. When Gerhard Berger came from Ferrari to Benetton in late 1995 during winter testing, he found the balance of the car very poor.

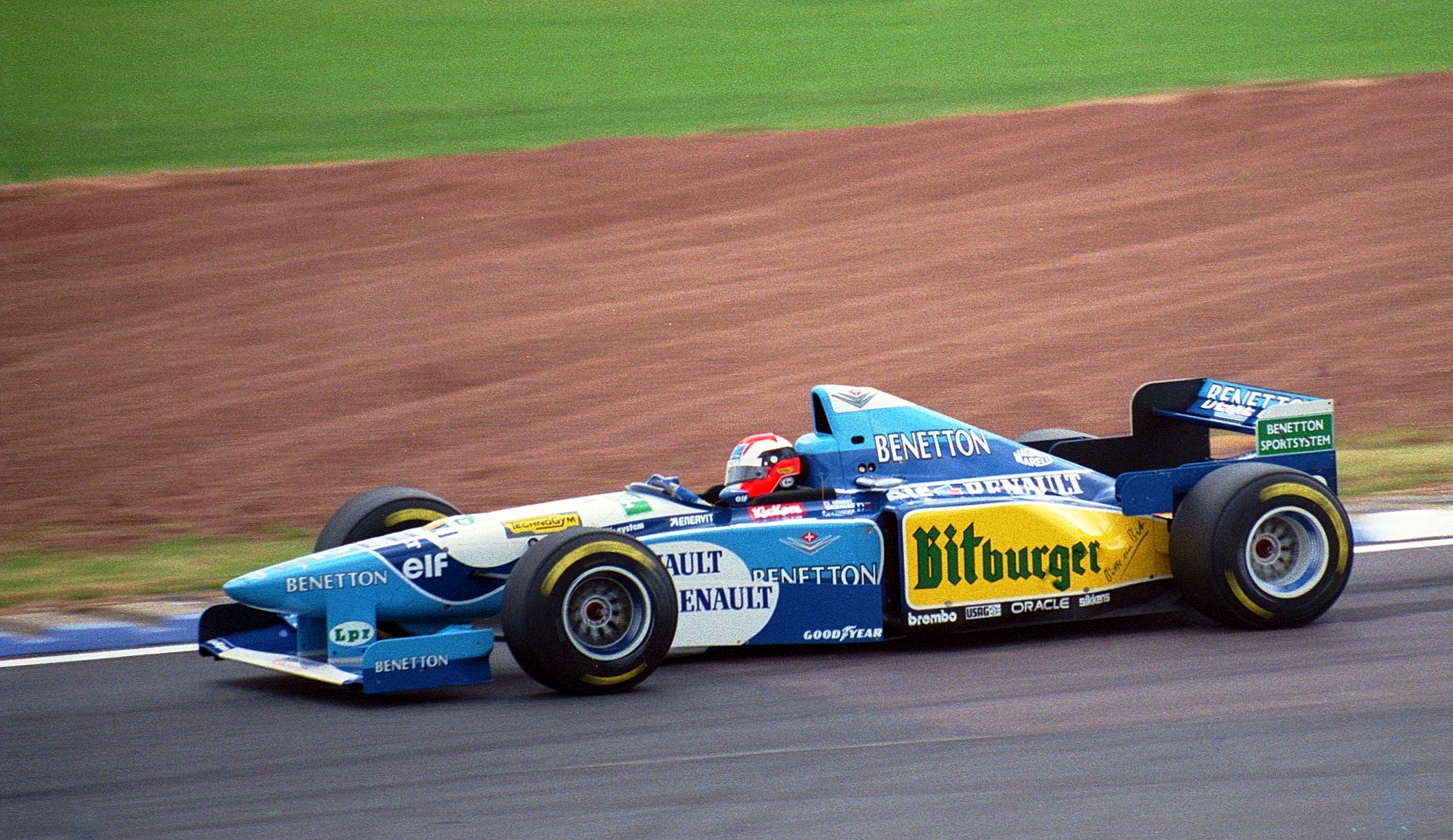
Johnny Herbert's B195 at 1995 British Grand Prix.

The car was designed with the aerodynamic limitations the FIA imposed for the season including smaller wings, better crash protection and the reduction of engine size from 3.5 to 3.0 litres. The car underwent two major design changes during the season: the first concerned the airbox, which debuted with a 'hump' shape; by the time of the French Grand Prix, the shape had reverted to the familiar slope that was used by the rest of the teams; the other change concerned the front wing; at the start of the season, the wing had two 'notches' on either side; by the time of the German Grand Prix, the notches were gone, and the wing was flatter, in line with what the other top teams were running. As was the case in the previous season, Schumacher's car was adorned with a number of small red accents, the better to help distinguish his car from his teammate's.

After an initial disqualification and subsequent re-instatement of victory in Brazil (although the constructor's points were not reinstated), Schumacher carried on from where he had left off in 1994, and battled Damon Hill for the world championship. The two drivers had several collisions and near misses just as in 1994, the most notable was at the British Grand Prix that year when Hill attempted to pass and took both him and Schumacher out of the race. Schumacher capitalised on further mistakes by Williams and Hill and took nine victories, easily retaining his championship, whilst Johnny Herbert took victory at Silverstone and Monza, another race where Hill and Schumacher had a crash.

By season's end, Herbert was openly accusing the team of favouring Schumacher and receiving inferior treatment and equipment.

Benetton team won its first (and only) Constructors' Championship that season, but most of their key technical staff defected to Ferrari when Schumacher signed for them for the 1996 season. Benetton B195 was the last Enstone-based Formula One car to win the world constructors' title until the Renault R25 in 2005.

== Sponsorship and livery ==
Benetton used the 'Mild Seven' logos, except at the French, British and German Grands Prix. In France, the Bitburger logo was replaced with "Drive Alkoholfrei".

== In popular culture ==
The Benetton B195 was featured in the Codemasters F1 2020 video game as a DLC for the "Deluxe Schumacher Edition".

== Complete Formula One results ==
(key) (results in bold indicate pole position)

Year	Entrant	Engine	Tyres	Drivers	1	2	3	4	5	6	7	8	9	10	11	12	13	14	15	16	17	Pts.	WCC
1995	Mild Seven Benetton Renault	Renault RS7; V10	**G**		BRA	ARG	SMR	ESP	MON	CAN	FRA	GBR	GER	HUN	BEL	ITA	POR	EUR	PAC	JPN	AUS	**137**	**1st**
1995	Mild Seven Benetton Renault	Renault RS7; V10	**G**	Michael Schumacher	1	3	**Ret**	**1**	1	**5**	1	Ret	1	11	1	Ret	2	1	1	**1**	Ret	**137**	**1st**
1995	Mild Seven Benetton Renault	Renault RS7; V10	**G**	Johnny Herbert	Ret	4	7	2	4	Ret	Ret	1	4	4	7	1	7	5	6	3	Ret	**137**	**1st**

– Schumacher's win at the Brazilian Grand Prix did not count towards Constructors' Championship points as the FIA did not reinstate the constructor's points after the initial disqualification due to fuel irregularities was overturned.
