= BOSS GP =

Single-seater racing championship

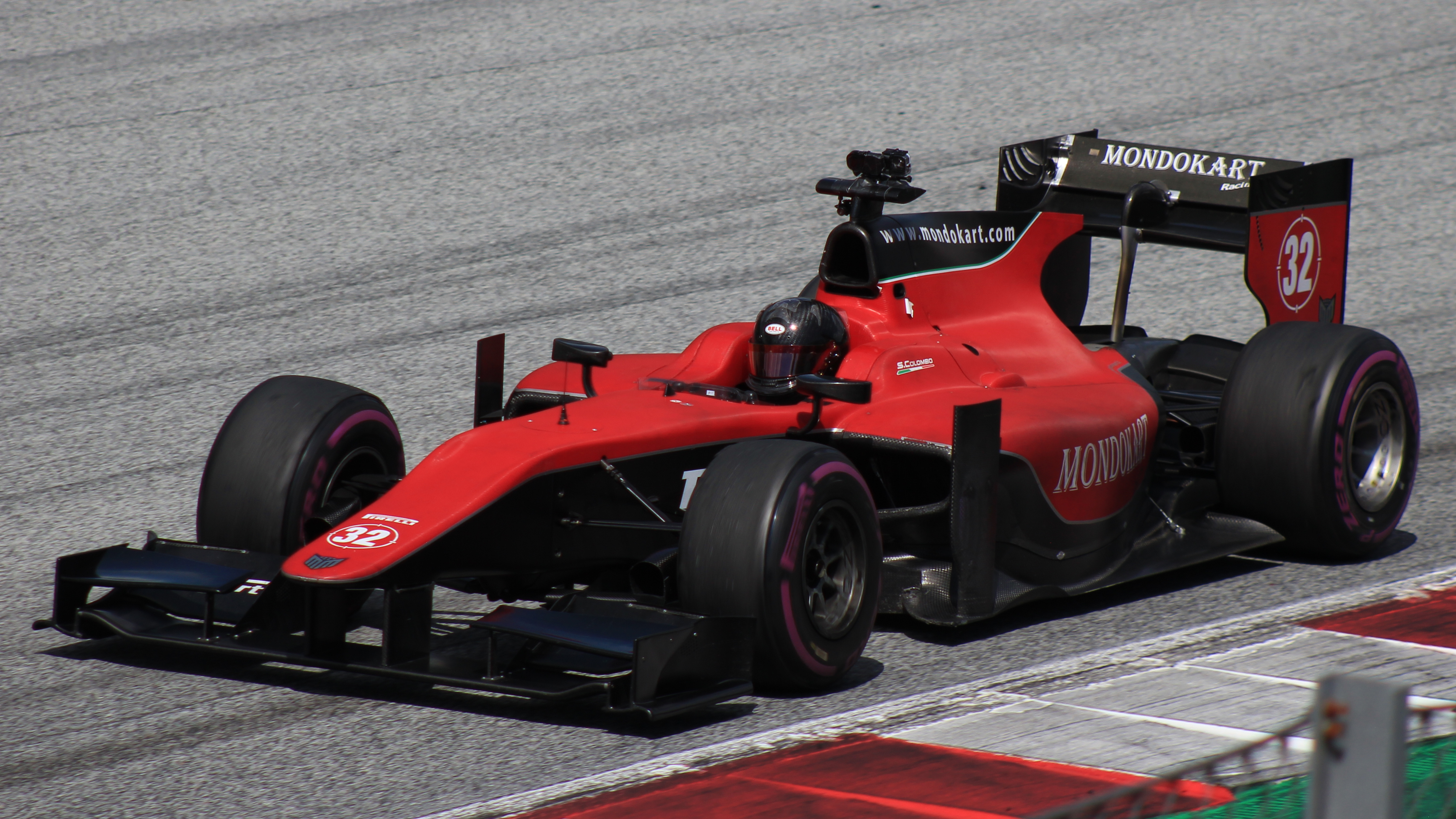
- BOSS GP Series
- Category: Single seaters
- Country: Europe
- Inaugural season: 1995
- Tyre suppliers: Pirelli
- Drivers' champion: F1 Class: (Germany) Ulf Ehninger; OPEN Class: (Latvia) Harald Schlegelmilch; FORMULA Class: (Italy) Simone Colombo; SUPER LIGHTS Class: (Germany) Henry Clausnitzer
- Official website: BOSS GP

The BOSS GP Racing Series is a motor racing series in Europe. The category originated in 1995 as the BOSS Formula series and evolved into the EuroBOSS Series. BOSS is an acronym that stands for Big Open Single Seaters.

== History ==
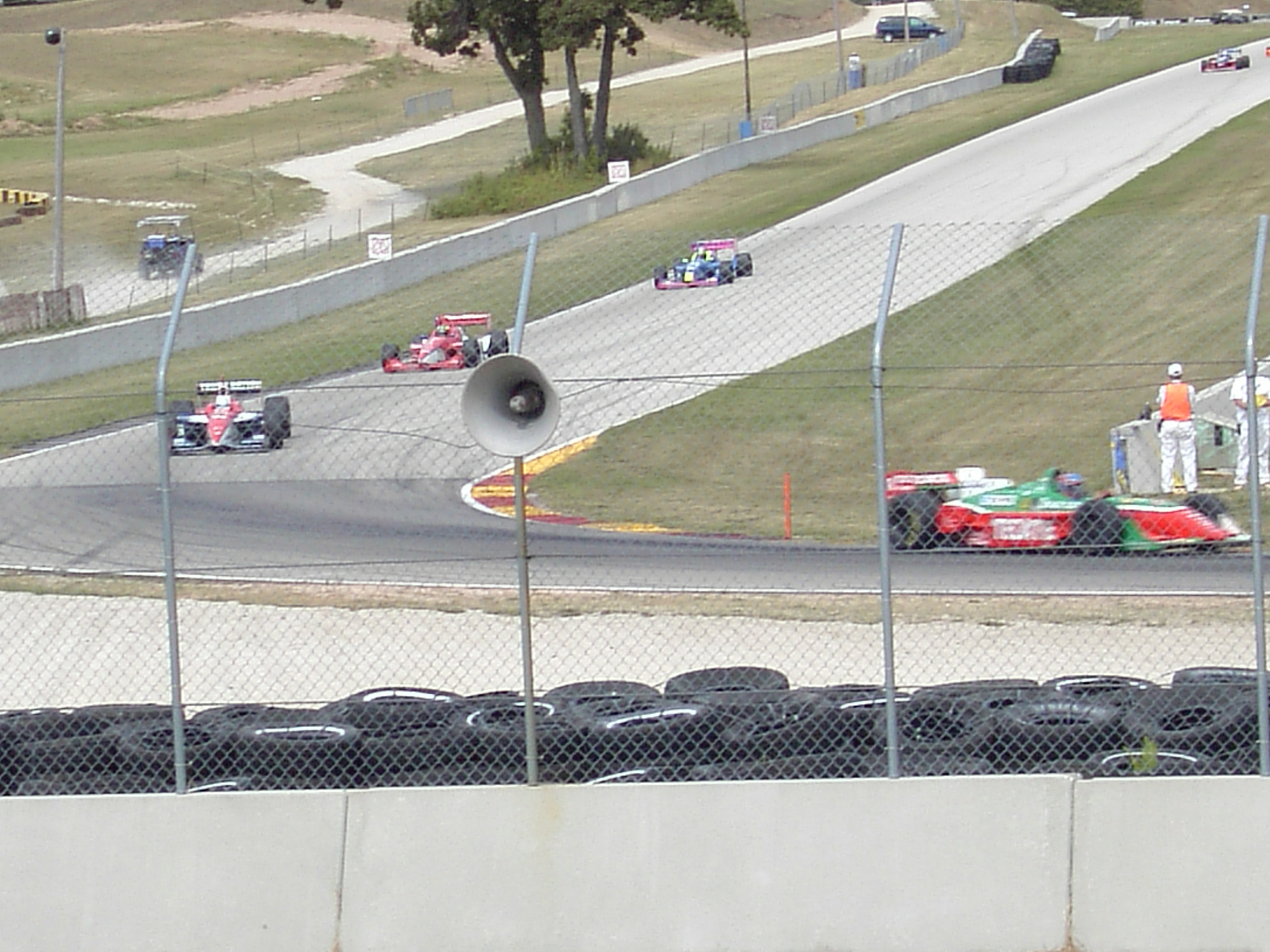
Group 9 BOSS cars racing at Road America, 2007

The BOSS series was created by Roger Cowman & Mark Haddon in 1995 under the regulations of the RAC Motor Sports Association and raced mainly in Great Britain. The series grew in popularity and later expanded to Europe, being renamed to European BOSS (shortened by the competitors to EuroBOSS) following the European expansion and the involvement of Paul Stoddart's European Aviation. The move to Europe resulted in increased investment into the series and an increased number of Formula 1 cars taking part in races. It mainly saw grids of around 12–15 cars but on some occasions as few as five cars competed in a race, and in some instances 20+ entries.

After the 2009 EuroBOSS season, Marijn van Kalmthout, Klaas Zwart (founder of Ascari Cars and the Ascari Race Resort), Henk de Boer, and Frits van Eerd decided to split off and organize their own race series. This ended up becoming BOSS GP. EuroBOSS continued on into 2010. BOSS GP flourished, with many drivers making the switch to the new series, whilst EuroBOSS saw smaller and smaller numbers as a result of the additional series being created. Eventually, the final 3 races of the 2010 EuroBOSS season were cancelled and the series was disbanded, with competitors switching over to BOSS GP.

Most BOSS GP entries are more recent secondary level single-seaters such as GP2 cars and Renault World Series cars along with a small number of 90s and 00s Formula 1 cars, but common EuroBOSS entries included Formula 1 machines from Benetton, Jordan, Tyrrell, Minardi and on occasions a V12 Ferrari. Other frequent entrants in BOSS series have been Lola and Reynard CART chassis, the 1997–2002 Panoz (aka G-Force) and Dallara IndyCar chassis. From 2012, the 2003-2011 Dallara and Panoz Champ Car chassis have also been used after the switch to the new IndyCar formula.

The series is mainly populated by wealthy drivers, although efforts have been made to attract more young drivers who want experience with Formula 1 or Formula 2-level machinery. BOSS GP removes a lot of the restrictions present in the majority of Formula series, allowing weight and power restrictions to be abandoned as long as they comply to the FIA safety requirements. The series uses Pirelli tyres that have a larger operating window than those in F1 and F2; this is mainly designed to help the drivers, but they still behave similarly enough to the P-Zeros used in F2 to provide a valid reference for the younger drivers. BOSS GP also has fairly loose restrictions on testing, something which many junior drivers have exploited to gain experience with new circuits, new cars and learning how to handle cars with high levels of downforce.

As of 2013, two rounds of the BOSS GP series have formed an official German championship sanctioned by the DMSB. In the 2018 season, BOSS GP ran for the first time a support race for two major motorsports events: the German Grand Prix at Hockenheim and the Red Bull Ring round of the DTM Championship. The series later supported DTM at Assen in 2019 and Spa-Francorchamps in 2020. Before those plans were cancelled entirely due to COVID-19 restrictions, it also expressed an interest in taking part in the planned 70 years of F1 celebrations at Silverstone.

In 2020, the championship ran with a reduced season; the planned Misano and Hockenheim rounds were forced to be cancelled due to COVID-19 restrictions, reducing the 2020 season to four weekends. Notable drivers who have raced in BOSS, EuroBOSS and BOSS GP include Scott Mansell (who won the EuroBOSS championship in 2004), IndyCar driver Rinus VeeKay, former Williams and Jaguar driver Antonio Pizzonia, former Minardi driver Tarso Marques and former Formula 2 driver Mahaveer Raghunathan. Romain Grosjean also did some test sessions with BOSS GP regulars Top Speed before his return to F1 with Lotus in 2012.

== Similar series ==
EuroBOSS was the European equivalent of USBOSS and OZBOSS. EuroBOSS tended to mainly have F1 Cars, whilst USBOSS consisted mainly of Indy and Champ Cars and OZBOSS tended to have Formula 4000 or equivalent.

== Cars ==
Over the years, the classes have been updated. Relatively new cars like the Dallara GP2/11 and GP2/08 (GP2), Dallara T12 and T08 (WSbR), and Lola B05/52 (A1GP/Auto GP/FA1) have been raced in the series, as well as some Formula One cars from the 2000s, such as the Toro Rosso STR1, Super Aguri SA06, Jaguar R3, and Jaguar R5. For 2010, EuroBOSS allowed the Tatuus N.T07 International Formula Master car to race in the series; this car was never allowed in the BOSS GP series.

Current classes and cars in the BOSS GP Racing Series (since season 2022):

F1 Class	Formula 1 cars built from 1996
Open Class	Lotus T125, Rodin FZED, Champ Car and IndyCar built from 2008
Formula Class	F2/GP2, Auto GP, A1GP, FA1, Superleague Formula, World Series by Nissan/Renault V8
Super Lights Class	World Series by Nissan/Renault V6, Formula 3000, Formula Nippon

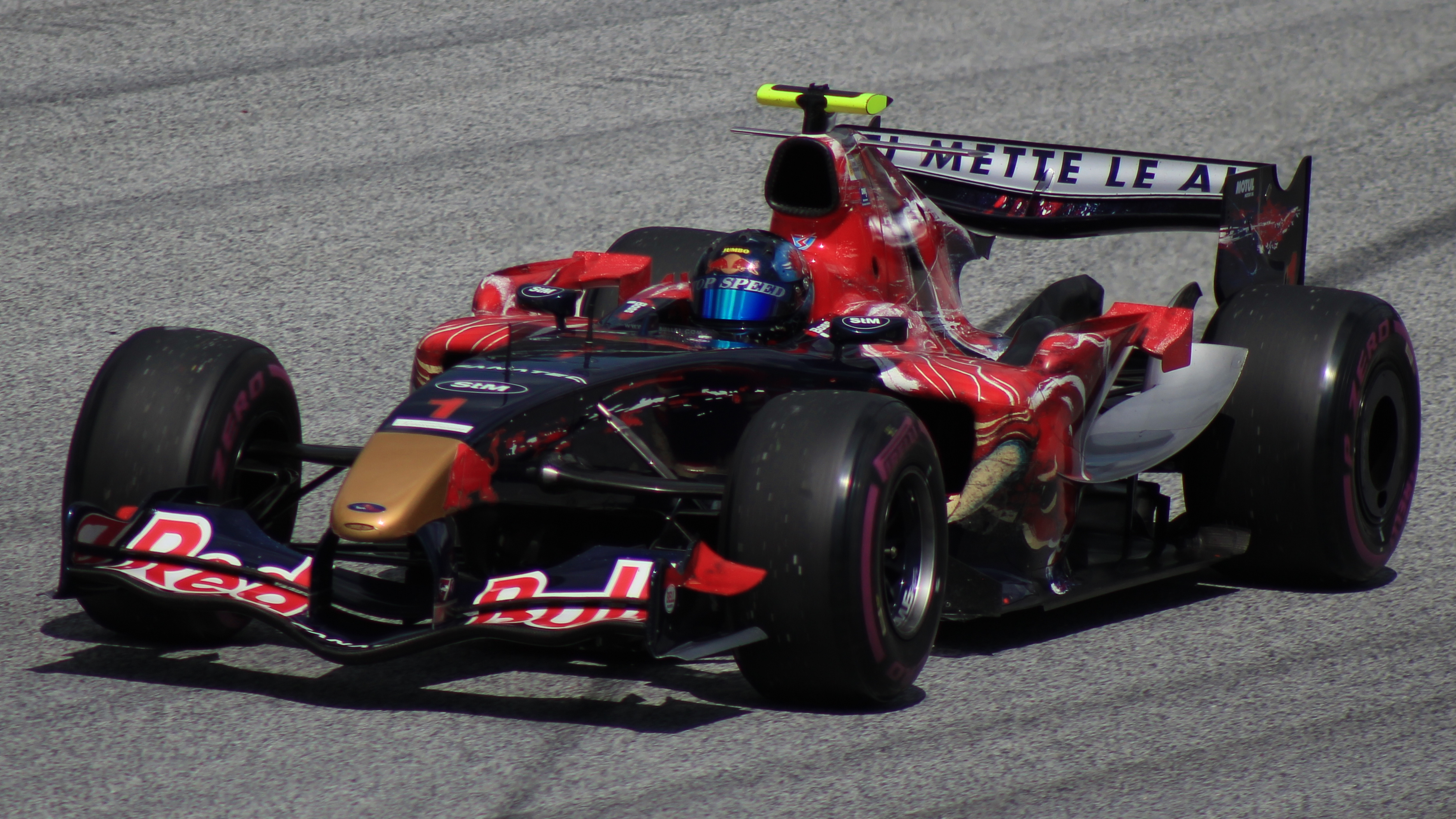
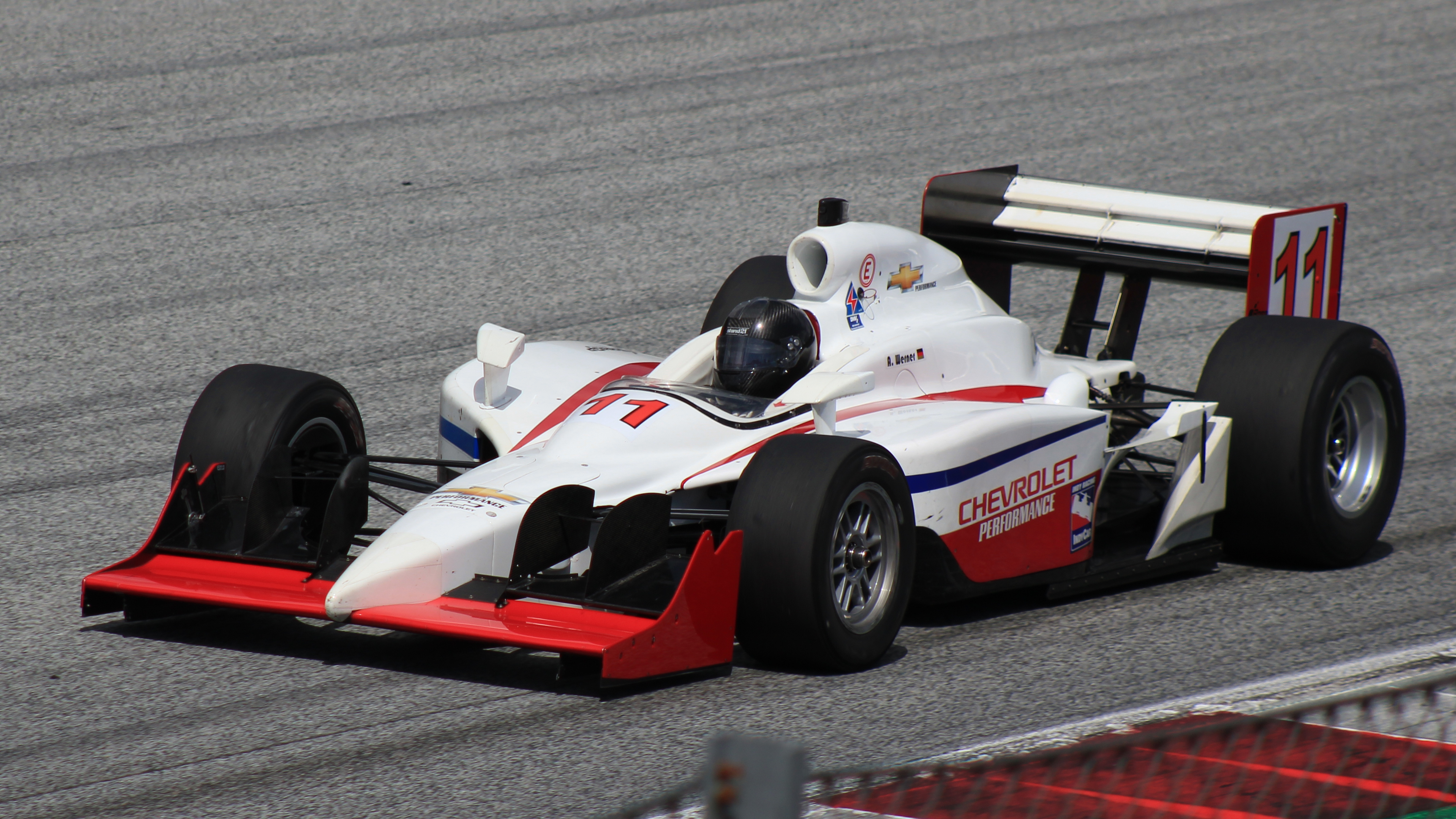
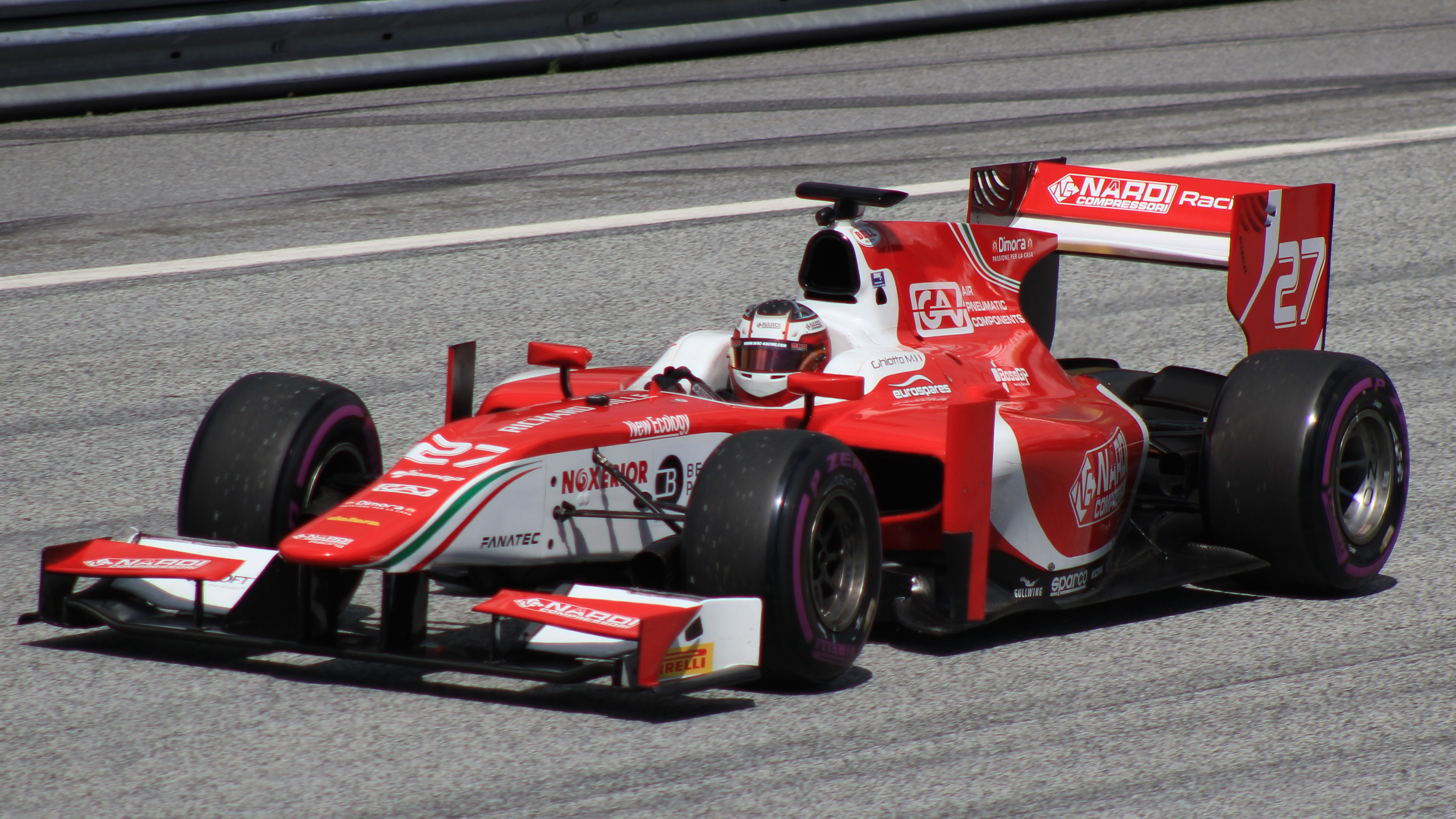
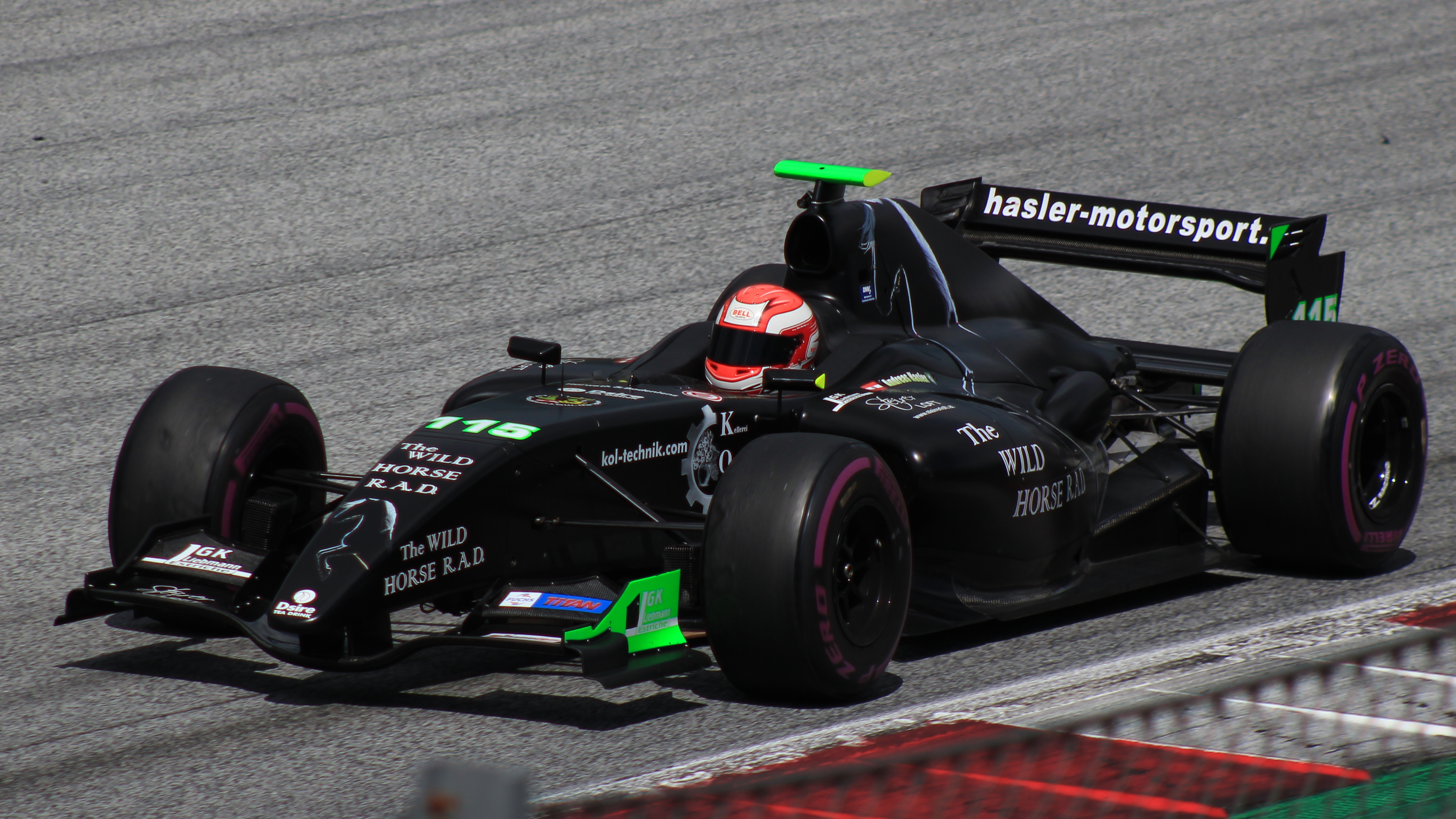
From left to right: The Toro Rosso STR1, an F1 Class car; the Dallara IR-05, an Open Class car; the Dallara GP2/11, a Formula Class car; and the Dallara T08, a Super Lights Class car.

== Circuits ==
- (Portugal) Algarve International Circuit (2009)
- (Sweden) Anderstorp Raceway (2009)
- (Spain) Ascari Race Resort (2006–2008)
- (Czech Republic) Autodrom Most (2002)
- Automotodróm Slovakia Ring (2010)
- (United Kingdom) Brands Hatch (1996, 1998–2004, 2006, 2009)
- (Czech Republic) Brno Circuit (2014–2023)
- (France) Bugatti Circuit (2002–2004)
- (United Kingdom) Castle Combe Circuit (1997)
- (Spain) Circuit de Barcelona-Catalunya (2007)
- (France) Circuit de Nevers Magny-Cours (2005, 2010, 2026)
- (Belgium) Circuit de Spa-Francorchamps (2003, 2008–2011, 2020)
- (France) Circuit Paul Ricard (2013–2015, 2017, 2022–2024, 2026)
- (Belgium) Circuit Zolder (2000, 2003–2010, 2013, 2015, 2017)
- (Netherlands) Circuit Zandvoort (2002, 2006, 2009–2014, 2017)
- (Spain) Circuito del Jarama (2008)
- (United Kingdom) Donington Park (1995–2004, 2007–2008, 2011)
- (France) Dijon-Prenois (2009–2010, 2012, 2015)
- (Germany) Hockenheimring (2007–2008, 2010–2019, 2022–present)
- (Italy) Imola Circuit (2012, 2014, 2016–2017, 2019–2020)
- (Germany) Lausitzring (2004–2005, 2009)
- (United Kingdom) Mallory Park (1996–1997)
- (Italy) Misano World Circuit (2021–2025)
- (Republic of Ireland) Mondello Park (1996–1999, 2001–2002, 2006)
- (Italy) Monza Circuit (2011–2016, 2018–2019, 2021, 2023, 2025)
- (Germany) Motorsport Arena Oschersleben (2006)
- (Italy) Mugello Circuit (2014, 2020–present)
- (Germany) Nürburgring (2007–2008, 2010, 2012, 2024–present)
- (United Kingdom) Oulton Park (1995–1998)
- (Austria) Red Bull Ring (2011–2014, 2016, 2018–2019, 2021–2024, 2026)
- (United Kingdom) Rockingham Motor Speedway (2001)
- (United Kingdom) Silverstone Circuit (1995–1999, 2001, 2003–2004)
- (United Kingdom) Snetterton Circuit (1997, 2007)
- (United Kingdom) Thruxton Circuit (1996, 1998–2000)
- (Netherlands) TT Circuit Assen (2010, 2015–2019, 2023–2025)

== Champions ==
=== BOSS Formula and EuroBOSS ===
Season	Champion	Team Champion
BOSS Formula
1995	(Germany) Klaus Panchyrz; Reynard 93D-Cosworth	(Germany) Mönninghoff Racing
1996	(Sweden) Johan Rajamaki; Footwork FA13-Judd	(Sweden) Rajamaki Racing
1997	(United Kingdom) Nigel Greensall; Tyrrell 022-Judd	(United Kingdom) European Aviation
1998	(United Kingdom) Nigel Greensall; Tyrrell 022-Judd	(United Kingdom) European Aviation
1999	(United Kingdom) Tony Worswick; Jordan 194-Judd	(United Kingdom) Worswick Engineering
2000	(United Kingdom) Dave Hutchinson; Benetton B194-Ford	(United Kingdom) Kockney Koi Yamitsu
EuroBOSS
2001	(United Kingdom) Tony Worswick; Jordan 194-Judd	(United Kingdom) Worswick Engineering
2002	(South Africa) Earl Goddard; Benetton B194-Ford	(United Kingdom) Kockney Koi Yamitsu
2003	(Netherlands) Klaas Zwart; Benetton B197-Judd	(United Kingdom) Team Ascari
2004	(United Kingdom) Scott Mansell; Benetton B197-Judd	(United Kingdom) Mansell Motorsport
2005	(France) Patrick d’Aubreby; Benetton B192-Ford	(United Kingdom) Team Griffiths/Team Ascari
2006	(Netherlands) Klaas Zwart; Benetton B197-Judd	(United Kingdom) Team Ascari
2007	(Netherlands) Klaas Zwart; Benetton B197-Judd	(United Kingdom) Team Ascari
2008	(Austria) Ingo Gerstl; Dallara SN01-Nissan	(Austria) TopSpeed
2009	(Netherlands) Henk de Boer; Panoz DP01-Cosworth	(Netherlands) De Boer Manx
2010	(France) Damien Charveriat; Dallara GP2/05-Mecachrome	(Austria) Zele Racing

=== BOSS GP Racing Series ===
Season	Open Champion	Team Champion	Secondary Class Champion
2010	(Netherlands) Klaas Zwart; Benetton B197-Judd	(United Kingdom) Team Ascari	M: (Germany) Karl Heinz Becker; Dallara SN01-Nissan
2011	(Netherlands) Klaas Zwart; Jaguar R5-Cosworth; Benetton B197-Judd	(United Kingdom) Team Ascari	F: (Austria) Ingo Gerstl; Dallara GP2/05-Mecachrome; M: (Austria) Norbert Gruber; Dallara T05-Renault
2012	(Netherlands) Klaas Zwart; Jaguar R5-Cosworth	(United Kingdom) Team Ascari	F: (Austria) Bernd Herndlhofer; Dallara GP2/05-Mecachrome; M: (Austria) Johann Ledermair; Dallara T08-Renault
2013	(Luxembourg) Gary Hauser; Dallara GP2/08-Mecachrome	(Luxembourg) Racing Experience	F: (Luxembourg) Gary Hauser; Dallara GP2/08-Mecachrome; M: (Germany) Hans Laub; Lola B99/50-Cosworth
2014	(Poland) Jakub Śmiechowski; Dallara GP2/08-Mecachrome	(Poland) Inter Europol Competition	F: (Poland) Jakub Śmiechowski; Dallara GP2/08-Mecachrome; M: (Germany) Hans Laub; Dallara T08-Renault
2015	(Netherlands) Klaas Zwart; Jaguar R5-Cosworth	not awarded	F: (Austria) Johann Ledermair; Dallara GP2/08-Mecachrome; M: (Germany) Hans Laub; Dallara T08-Renault
2016	(Austria) Ingo Gerstl; Toro Rosso STR1-Cosworth	not awarded	F: (France) Christopher Brenier; Panoz DP09B-Menard
2017	(Austria) Ingo Gerstl; Toro Rosso STR1-Cosworth	not awarded	F: (India) Mahaveer Raghunathan; Lola B05/52-Gibson
2018	(Austria) Ingo Gerstl; Toro Rosso STR1-Cosworth	not awarded	F: (Germany) Florian Schnitzenbaumer; Dallara GP2/08-Mecachrome
2019	(Austria) Ingo Gerstl; Toro Rosso STR1-Cosworth	not awarded	F: (Italy) Marco Ghiotto; Dallara GP2/11-Mecachrome
2020	(Austria) Ingo Gerstl; Toro Rosso STR1-Cosworth	not awarded	F: (Italy) Marco Ghiotto; Dallara GP2/11-Mecachrome
2021	(Germany) Ulf Ehninger; Benetton B197-Judd	not awarded	F: (Italy) Marco Ghiotto; Dallara GP2/11-Mecachrome
2022	(Austria) Ingo Gerstl; Toro Rosso STR1-Cosworth	not awarded	O: (Latvia) Harald Schlegelmilch; Dallara T12-Gibson; F: (Italy) Simone Colombo; Dallara GP2/11-Mecachrome; SL: (Austria) Andreas Hasler; Dallara T08-Renault
2023	(Austria) Ingo Gerstl; Toro Rosso STR1-Cosworth	not awarded	O: (Brazil) Antônio Pizzonia; Dallara T12-Gibson; F: (Italy) Simone Colombo; Dallara GP2/11-Mecachrome; SL: (Germany) Henry Clausnitzer; Tatuus FRV6-Renault
2024	(Germany) Ulf Ehninger; Benetton B197-Judd	not awarded	O: (Brazil) Antônio Pizzonia; Dallara T12-Gibson; F: (Italy) Marco Ghiotto; Dallara GP2/11-Mecachrome; SL: (Switzerland) Stephan Glaser; Dallara T08-Renault
2025	(Germany) Ulf Ehninger; Benetton B197-Judd	not awarded	O: (Latvia) Harald Schlegelmilch; Dallara T12-Gibson; FP: (Italy) Simone Colombo; Dallara GP2/11-Mecachrome; F: (Republic of Ireland) Paul O'Connell; Dallara T12-Gibson; SL: (Germany) Henry Clausnitzer; Tatuus FRV6-Renault
