= Circuito Ascari =

Motor racing circuit near Ronda, Spain

Ascari Club
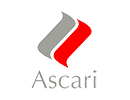

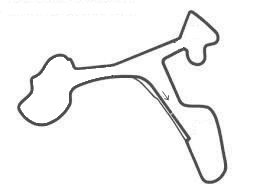
- Full Circuit (2003–present)
- Location: Ronda, Málaga, Spain
- Coordinates: 36°49′32″N 5°5′1″W
- Owner: Klaas Zwart (2003–March 2022)
- Broke ground: 2000; 26 years ago
- Opened: 2003; 23 years ago
- Construction cost: €40 million
- Architect: Klaas Zwart
- Major events: Former: EuroBOSS Series (2006–2008)
- Website: ascari.net

Full Circuit (2003–present)
- Surface: Asphalt
- Length: 3.371 mi (5.425 km)
- Turns: 26

Circuit 1/Center (2003–present)
- Length: 1.611 mi (2.592 km)

Circuit 2/North (2003–present)
- Length: 0.833 mi (1.341 km)

Circuit 3/South (2003–present)
- Length: 0.949 mi (1.527 km)

The Ascari Club resort is a private motorsports club for automotive enthusiasts and manufacturers with a 5.425 km (3.371 mi) long motor racing circuit near Ronda, a city in the Spanish Province of Málaga. It was founded, designed, and built by Dutchman Klaas Zwart, a racing enthusiast and owner of Ascari Cars; the track was completed in 2003. In 2022, Zwart sold the facility to two companies in Switzerland and Argentina.

== History ==
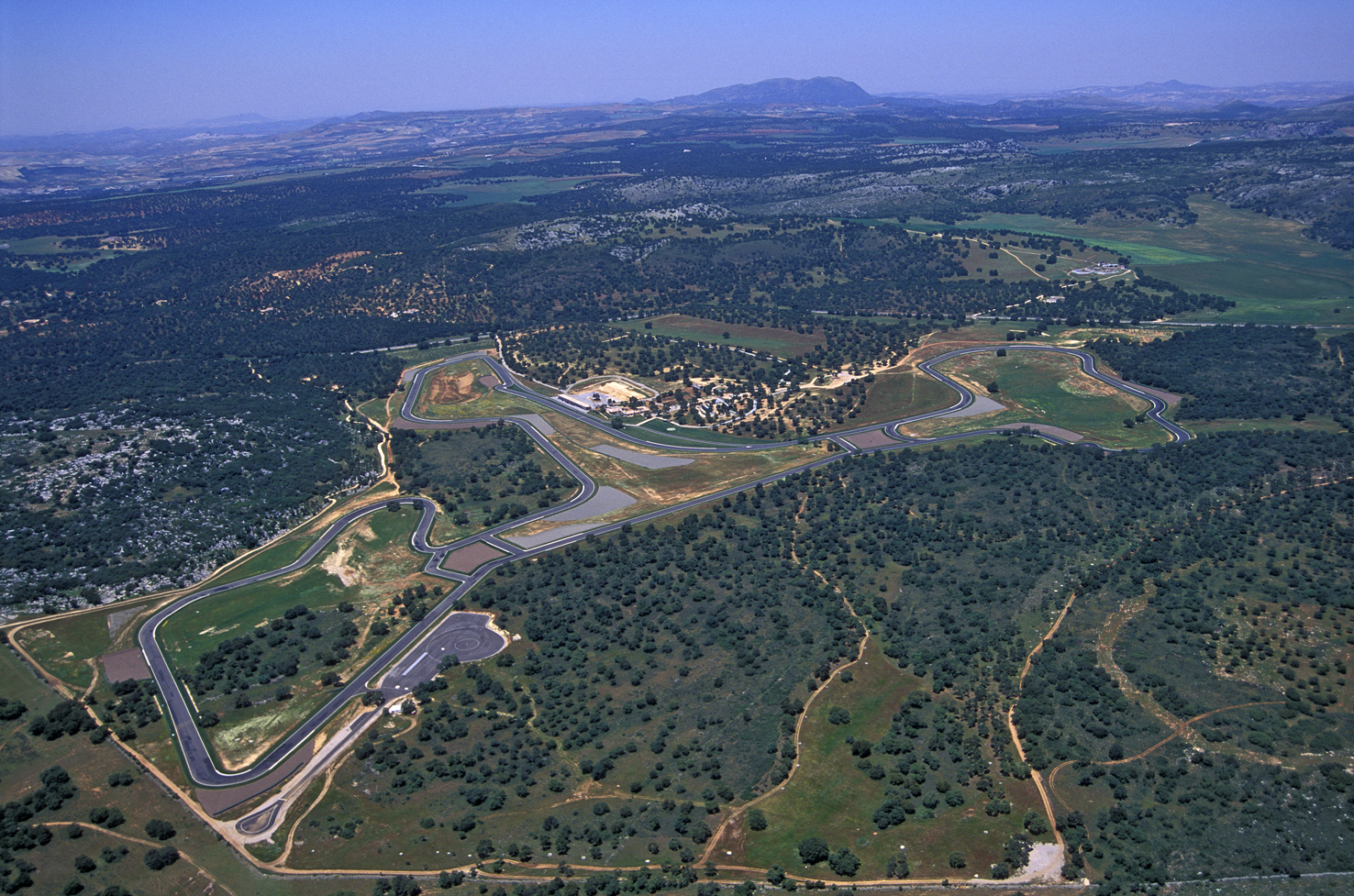
Aerial view of the track at Ascari; the south sub-circuit is on the left side

After making his fortune in the oil industry, Zwart participated in various racing events, including the British GT where he finished third in 1995 and EuroBOSS, where he was champion in 2003, 2006, and 2007; he purchased the Ascari Cars marque in 1999 and began considering where he and others could drive their supercars safely away from road traffic, which led him to purchase land near Ronda, in the southern part of Spain. Construction of the track began in 2000, and Zwart designed the track to conform with the existing contours of the site. It was completed in 2003. Final cost was estimated at €40 million. The site was formerly used as a sheep farm.

After building the track, Zwart opened up membership to 500 wealthy motorsports enthusiasts, including Martin Brundle, Christian Danner, Jay Kay, and Dolph Lundgren. In March 2022, CEO Jesús Gijón confirmed that two companies, one from Switzerland and one from Argentina, had purchased the Ascari site from Zwart. The new owners expressed concern that nearby proposed photovoltaic energy developments could cause "irreparable damage for the landscape and environment in the area".

== Design ==
The site is approximately 10 km (6.2 mi) from Ronda, the nearest town, located between the hills and a military training base so noise is not an issue. Because of its location, it is favored by European car manufacturers for product launches.

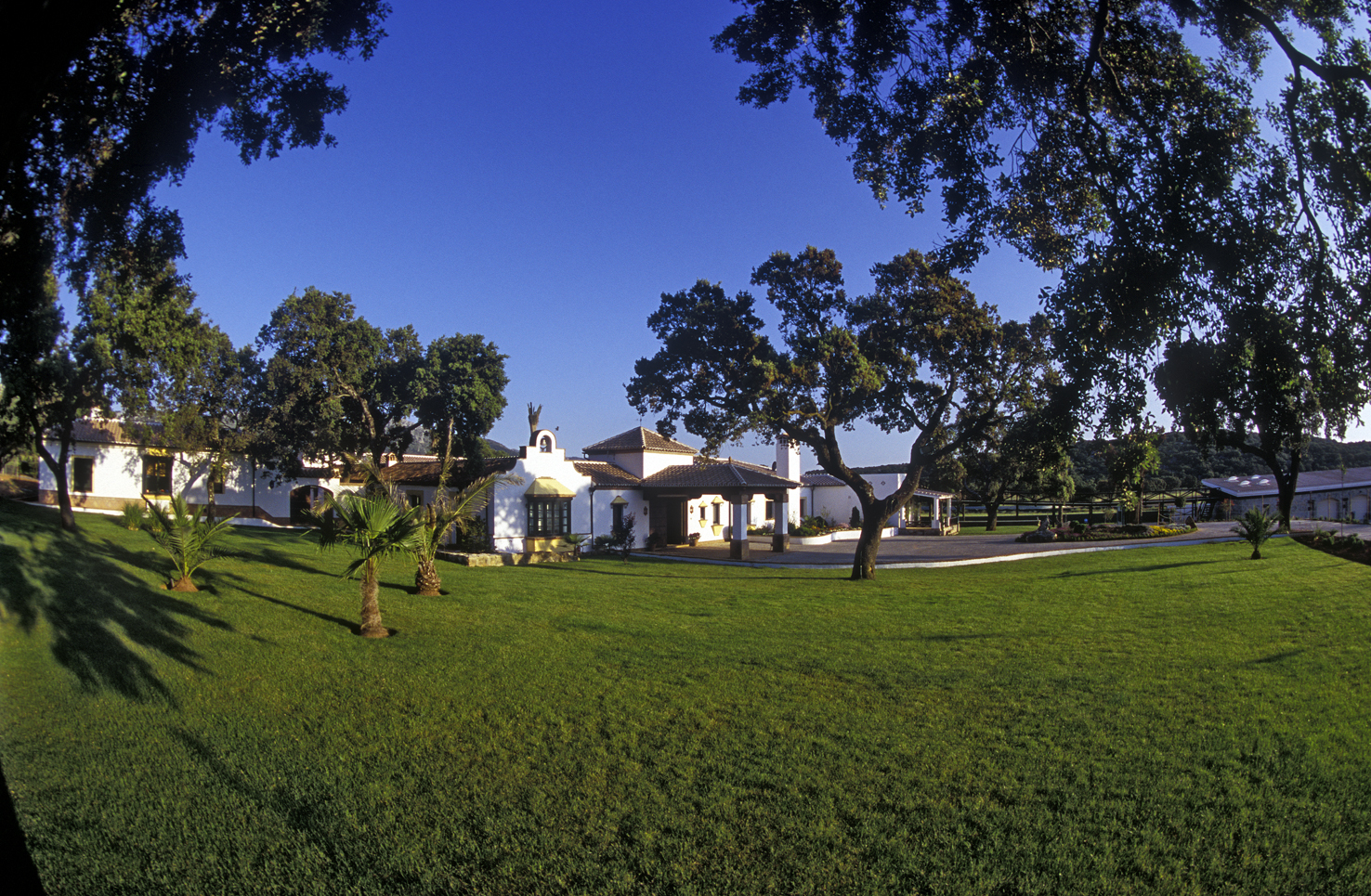
Ascari clubhouse

In addition to the track, the clubhouse features a complete restaurant and pool reminiscent of a Spanish villa.

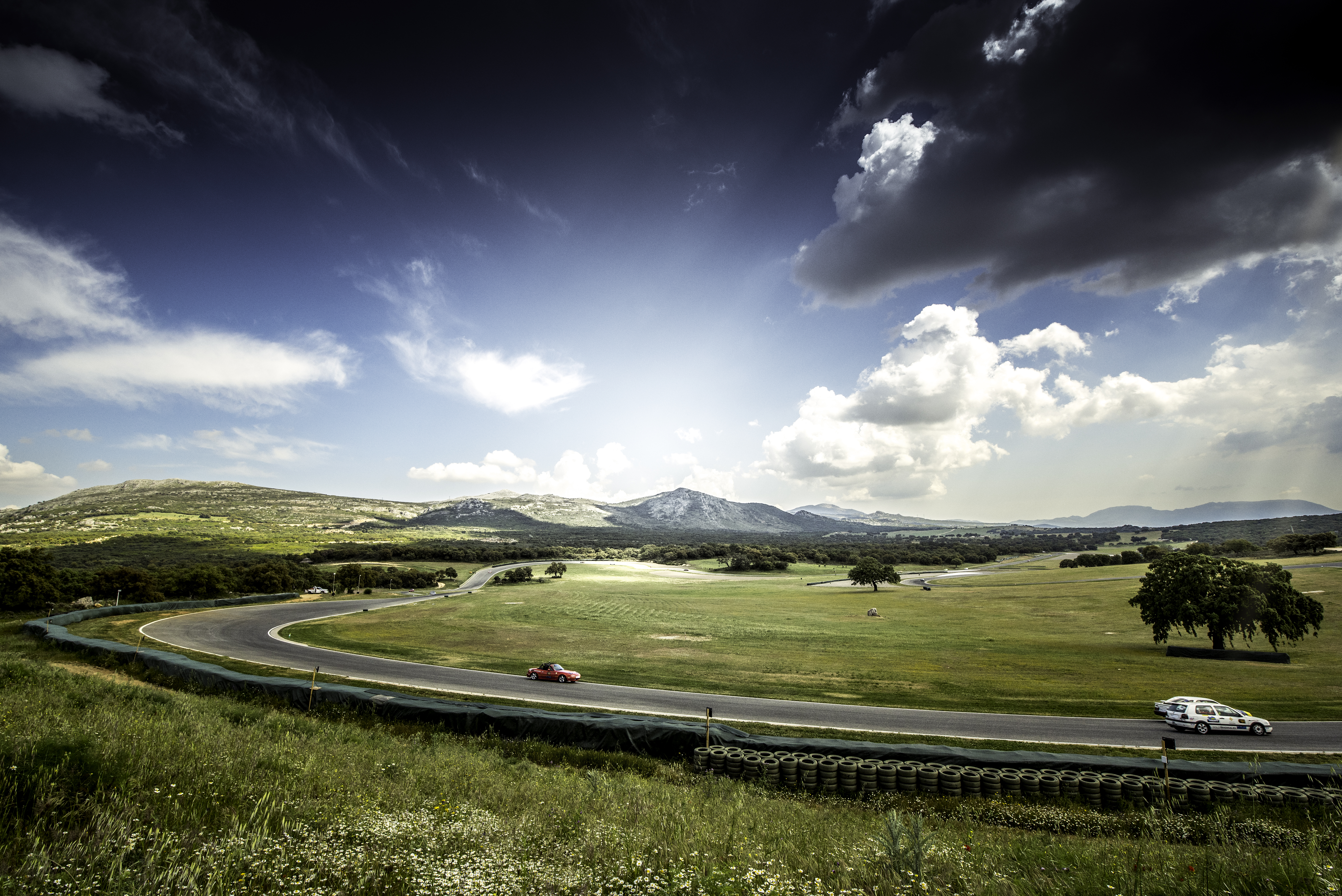
"Daytona" curve at Ascari (2018)

Many of the full circuit's 26 curves are deliberately reminiscent of famous turns at other tracks around the world. The track is 12.2 m (40 ft) wide, featuring ascending and descending grades of up to 12%, and banked turns of up to 18%. Visitors may choose to rent a car at the track, ranging from race-prepared regular production sports cars to ex-Formula 1 racing machines.

== Lap times ==
Klaas Zwart set the overall record of 1:38.46 in an ex-F1 Jaguar R5 (2004) in 2019. Pål Pettersen Berg set the record for roadgoing vehicles in 2020 at 2:14.078 in a Porsche 911 GT2 RS (991.2).

== In popular media ==
Sony Computer Entertainment used Ronda and the Ascari resort to launch their racing video game Gran Turismo 6 in 2013. It is a playable track in the game.

== See also ==
- Bilster Berg, a similar race resort in Germany
- Monticello Motor Club, a race resort in New York (state)
