= Benetton B196 =

Formula One racing car

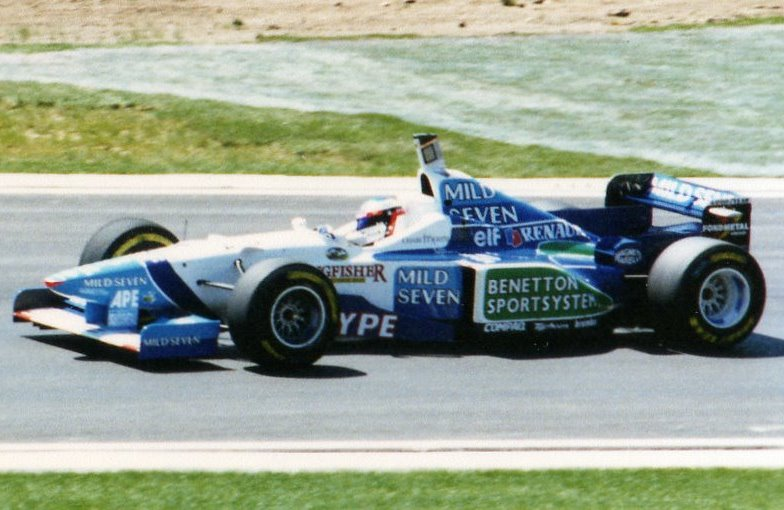
- Jean Alesi driving the B196 at the 1996 San Marino Grand Prix
- Category: Formula One
- Constructor: Benetton Formula Ltd.
- Designers: Ross Brawn (Technical Director); Rory Byrne (Chief Designer); Pat Symonds (Head of R&D); Nikolas Tombazis (Head of Aerodynamics); Bernard Dudot (Chief Engine Designer) (Renault)
- Predecessor: B195
- Successor: B197

Technical specifications
- Chassis: Carbon fibre monocoque
- Suspension (front): Double wishbone, pushrod
- Suspension (rear): Double wishbone, pushrod
- Engine: Renault RS8/RS8B, 3,000 cc (183.1 cu in), 72° V10, NA, mid-engine, longitudinally-mounted
- Transmission: Benetton transverse 7-speed, with the possibility of running a 6-speed sequential semi-automatic
- Power: 700 hp (522 kW; 710 PS) @ 16,000 rpm
- Fuel: Elf
- Tyres: Goodyear

Competition history
- Notable entrants: (Italy) Mild Seven Benetton Renault (Note: Previously under British license from 1986 to 1995.)
- Notable drivers: 3. (France) Jean Alesi; 4. (Austria) Gerhard Berger
- Debut: 1996 Australian Grand Prix
- Last event: 1996 Japanese Grand Prix
| Races | Wins | Podiums | Poles | F/Laps |
|---|---|---|---|---|
| 16 | 0 | 10 | 0 | 3 |
- Constructors' Championships: 0
- Drivers' Championships: 0

The Benetton B196 is a Formula One racing car with which the Benetton team competed in the 1996 Formula One World Championship. It was driven by the experienced pairing of Jean Alesi and Gerhard Berger, who both moved from Ferrari to replace departing 1994 and 1995 champion Michael Schumacher and his number two, Johnny Herbert. It was Berger's second stint with Benetton having last driven for them back in 1986.

== Overview ==
Many thought, Benetton and Alesi included, that this could well be the Frenchman's year to seriously challenge for the title - something many had been predicting he would do since he signed for Ferrari in 1991. However, after achieving the double of Drivers' and Constructors' Championships in 1995, the 1996 season saw the team slip slightly from its position of eminence. A direct development of the B195, the new drivers found the B196 difficult to drive, as it had been designed with Schumacher's driving style in mind, but managed to score a series of points and podium finishes. The biggest disappointment was not winning a race for the first time since 1988, although Alesi led in Monaco until he suffered a suspension failure, and Berger led in Germany until his engine failed with three laps remaining.

The team lost second place in the Constructors' Championship to Ferrari at the final race of the season in Japan, at which Alesi crashed out early and Berger also made mistakes.

The B196 was the first Benetton car to race under Italian nationality. It was also test-driven by former Benetton race driver Alessandro Nannini, six years after the helicopter crash which ended his F1 career, and by Vincenzo Sospiri.

Journalist Joe Saward opined in his review of the 1996 season that the B196 would have won races in 1996 if Schumacher had been driving it (instead of Berger and Alesi) and also that Schumacher, had he not left Benetton for Ferrari that season, would have won more races in the B196 than the three races he actually did win that season in the Ferrari F310.

== Livery ==
The livery was similar to the previous season but was drastically changed; a mixture of a white base colour, blue and green. Because the team itself was based in Great Britain, they included an Italian flag; the country where the fashion brand was based. The team gained several new sponsorships including Compaq, Kingfisher and Hype Energy. Fondmetal sponsored the team, but they were used BBS wheels instead.

Benetton used the Mild Seven logos, except at the French, British and German Grands Prix. In France, the Kingfisher logo was replaced with UB Group, owner of the brand.

== Complete Formula One results ==
(key) (results in bold indicate pole position; results in italics indicate fastest lap)

| Year | Entrant | Engine | Tyres | Drivers | 1 | 2 | 3 | 4 | 5 | 6 | 7 | 8 | 9 | 10 | 11 | 12 | 13 | 14 | 15 | 16 | Points | WCC |
|---|---|---|---|---|---|---|---|---|---|---|---|---|---|---|---|---|---|---|---|---|---|---|
| 1996 | Mild Seven Benetton Renault | Renault V10 | **G** | | AUS | BRA | ARG | EUR | SMR | MON | ESP | CAN | FRA | GBR | GER | HUN | BEL | ITA | POR | JPN | **68** | **3rd** |
| 1996 | Mild Seven Benetton Renault | Renault V10 | **G** | Jean Alesi | Ret | 2 | 3 | Ret | 6 | Ret | 2 | 3 | 3 | Ret | 2 | 3 | 4 | 2 | 4 | Ret | **68** | **3rd** |
| 1996 | Mild Seven Benetton Renault | Renault V10 | **G** | Gerhard Berger | 4 | Ret | Ret | 9 | 3 | Ret | Ret | Ret | 4 | 2 | 13 | Ret | 6 | Ret | 6 | 4 | **68** | **3rd** |
