= Scott Mansell =

English racing driver

- Mansell in 2015
- Nationality: (United Kingdom) British
- Born: Scott Kevin Mansell; 1 October 1985 (age 41) Birmingham, England, UK

Previous series
- 2015–2016 2015 2014 2012 2010–2012 2009 2005–2006 2005 2005 2003–2004 2003 2002: FIA Masters Historic Sports Car Championship; Radical Enduro Championship; Radical European Masters; V de V Challenge Endurance; BOSS GP; Superleague Formula; Indy Pro Series; Porsche Carrera Cup GB; 3000 Pro Series; Formula Ford Great Britain

Championship titles
- 2004: EuroBOSS

YouTube information
- Channel: Driver61
- Years active: 2015–present
- Genre: Motorsport
- Subscribers: 1.51 million
- Views: 361 million
- Last updated: 4 August, 2026

Scott Kevin Mansell (born 1 October 1985) is a British former racing driver and YouTube personality.

In June 2015, Mansell started the Driver61 YouTube channel, presenting videos primarily about Formula 1 and autosport in general. In July 2021, he co-founded a YouTube channel called OVERDRIVE (formerly Driven Media), which is primarily for experiments with cars and celebrating the engineering of unique vehicles.

He is not related to Formula 1 racing driver Nigel Mansell.

== Racing career ==
An alumnus of Bishop Vesey's Grammar School in Sutton Coldfield, Mansell was the 2004 EuroBOSS champion. Scott was a 2004 McLaren Autosport BRDC Award nominee, losing out to eventual winner Paul di Resta. At the Brands Hatch Indy circuit, Mansell set a lap record of 38.032 seconds during the 2004 EuroBOSS season. As well as the Brands Hatch record, Mansell has also broken lap records at Silverstone, Donington Park, Lausitzring and Zolder in 2004. In the same year Mansell won the BBC Midlands Young Sportsperson of the Year as well as being nominated for the Autosport Club Driver of the Year Award.

In 2009, he was the replacement for Duncan Tappy in the Superleague Formula for Galatasaray. This was his first race since the 2006 United States Grand Prix-supporting round of the Indy Pro Series.

== Racing record ==
=== American open-wheel racing ===
(key) (Races in bold indicate pole position)

==== Indy Pro Series ====
Year	Team	1	2	3	4	5	6	7	8	9	10	11	12	13	14	Rank	Points	Ref
2005	Dave McMillan Racing	HMS	PHX	STP	INDY	TXS	IMS	NSH	MIL	KTY	PPIR	SNM; 10	CHI	WGL; DNS	FON	**21st**	**36**	
2006	Michael Crawford Motorsports	HMS	STP1	STP2	INDY	WGL	IMS; 14	NSH; 14	MIL	KTY						**20th**	**77**	
2006	Guthrie Racing										SNM1; 11	SNM2; 7	CHI			**20th**	**77**	

=== Superleague Formula results ===
(Races in bold indicate pole position) (Races in italics indicate fastest lap)

Year	Team	Operator	1	2	3		4	5	6	Position	Points	Ref
2009	Galatasaray S.K.	Ultimate Motorsport	MAG	ZOL	DON		EST	MOZ	JAR	11th	26	
2009	Galatasaray S.K.	Ultimate Motorsport			13	12				11th	26	
