= Mevius =

Japanese cigarette brand

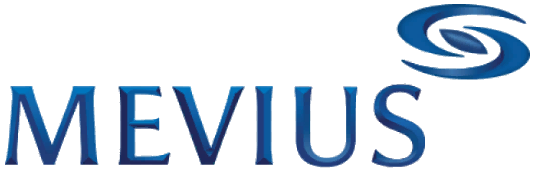
- Mevius brand logo

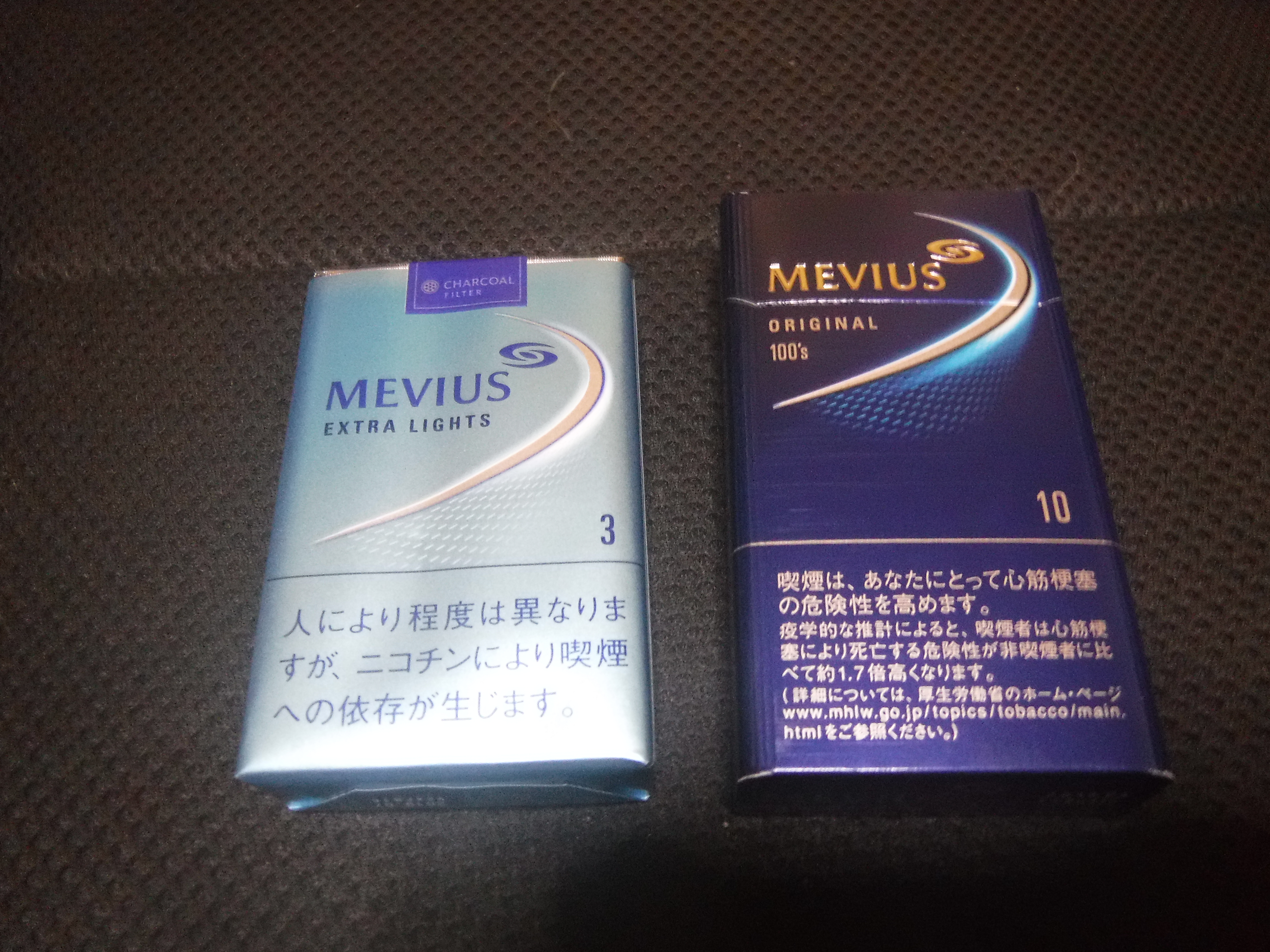
- Japanese packets of Mevius Extra Lights (left) and Original (right)
- Product type: Cigarette
- Current owner: Japan Tobacco
- Country: Japan
- Introduced: 1977; 49 years ago (As Mild Seven)
- Markets: See Markets

Mevius (メビウス, Mebiusu), previously called Mild Seven (マイルドセブン, Mairudo Sebun), is a Japanese brand of cigarettes, as of 2018 owned and manufactured by Japan Tobacco (JT).

== History ==
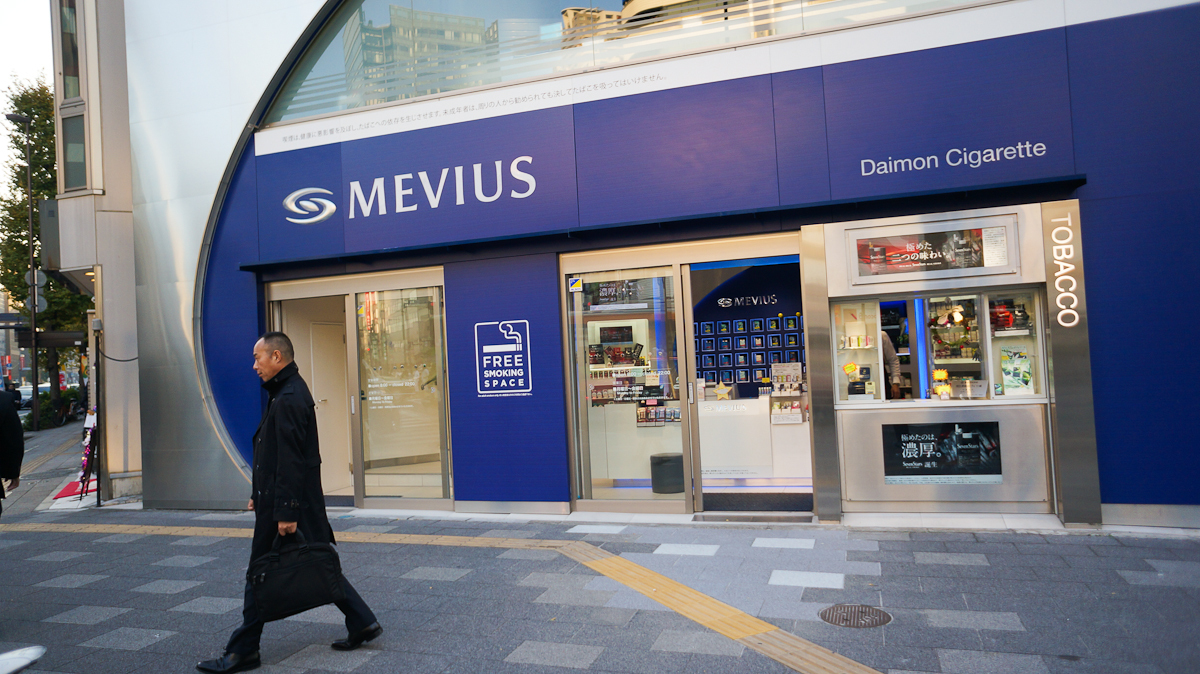
Mevius store pictured in 2015

Mevius was launched in 1977 under the name Mild Seven and was intended to be a mild version of the Seven Stars brand. It was launched overseas, again as Mild Seven in 1981, and was the first brand with a charcoal filter in an American blend in Japan. Initially it was intended to treat Mild Seven similarly to Seven Stars, but Japan Tabacco (JT) changed the F1 participation brand from Cabin (another Japanese brand owned by JT) to Mild Seven in 1994, and the vertical blue left side of the white background was changed to a belt design. At the time, the advertising slogan "The blue world of Mild Seven" was used in television commercials, and after that blue became the colour of choice for the brand.

The cigarettes are the third most widely smoked cigarette in the world with 76.5 billion around the world, behind Marlboro and Camel. Under the Mild Seven name, Mevius was a top seller. It is now the second largest cigarette brand in the world.

On August 8, 2012, Japan Tobacco announced that the Mild Seven brand name would be changed to Mevius, due to legislation around the branding of cigarettes as "mild" in some countries; and in an attempt to strengthen the brand's "premium image". The name change began in Japan in February, followed by Singapore and Korea the following month.

== Controversy ==
=== Counterfeit Mild Sevens from North Korea ===
In 2006, it was reported that counterfeit Mild Seven cigarettes were smuggled and sold outside of Japan. The pack design is very similar but the quality of the cigarettes such as scent and taste were not. According to the survey results both inside and outside of Japan, there is strong suspicion that these fake cigarette are manufactured as a part of the foreign currency fund acquisition activity by North Korea.

=== Mild Sevens recalled due to faulty filter ===
In December 2007, JT recalled some of the Mild Seven brand cigarettes sold in stores in Tokyo and neighbouring prefectures because of faulty filters. JT said 14,500 cigarettes would be recalled, including 2,500 faulty ones, which were shipped to 225 stores in Tokyo and three other prefectures on December 13, 2007. The faulty filters of the cigarettes were not glued on properly and were likely to come off, the company said.

=== JTI Korea pays Instagram users to promote Mevius ===
In September 2017, it was reported that JTI Korea had been paying Instagram users who had a lot of followers to post photos of its Mevius brand cigarettes, according to a document obtained by The Korea Times.

In return, Instagram "influencers," most of whom were men in their 20s and 30s, are said to have received as much as 5 million Won (approximately US$4,400) for each post. These photos primarily aim to spark interest in Mevius among women who follow young, fashion-savvy men who upload photos of their daily lives. A bigger program with JTI's marketing on the photo-centered social media is that underage users are indiscriminately exposed to these photos glamorizing cigarettes because anyone, regardless of age, can join Instagram and view pictures posted by others. In Korea's "Tobacco Business Act", there are no specific rules governing cigarette makers' marketing and sales activities on Instagram, Facebook and other social media.

One Instagram user came forward and informed The Korea Times of Instagram Influencer Guidelines to let the public know about JTI Korea's dubious social media marketing. He said he was approached by a person from JTI Korea's marketing team in June 2017. "JTI systematically recruited young male Instagram users who have at least 10,000 followers" the user said anonymously. "I heard they were offered 4 to 5 million Won for each post for a month, depending on the number of their followers. The users were given this piece of paper outlining how they should take photos and depict them". The company's marketing tactic is disgraceful, he said, stressing minors, particularly young girls, have been exposed to hundreds of photos that beautify smoking. "Many young girls closely follow these handsome men in their 20s and 30s who regularly post photos of their well-shaped bodies. They have certainly viewed many of these Mevius pictures" the user said. "I decided to let people know about JTI's unethical marketing, due to concerns that teenagers may become more inclined to smoke cigarettes".

JTI's guidelines outline how Instagram users take photos and what phrases they should use when depicting photos. However, JTI Korea denied drawing up such guidelines, stressing it had never conducted marketing on SNS. "Our company's internal policies forbid illegal marketing activities" a company official said. "JTI Korea strictly observes all relevant domestic laws in our business affairs".

=== Controversy over using tobacco leaves near Fukushima ===
There was controversy online about Mild Seven cigarettes being manufactured with tobacco leaves grown near the site of the Fukushima nuclear accident in Japan. Some have suggested that Mild Seven changed its name to Mevius in order to avoid such suspicion. However, the controversy was denied by JTI Korea's official statement that "Mevius does not use Japanese tobacco at all".

== Sport sponsorship ==
=== Formula 1 ===
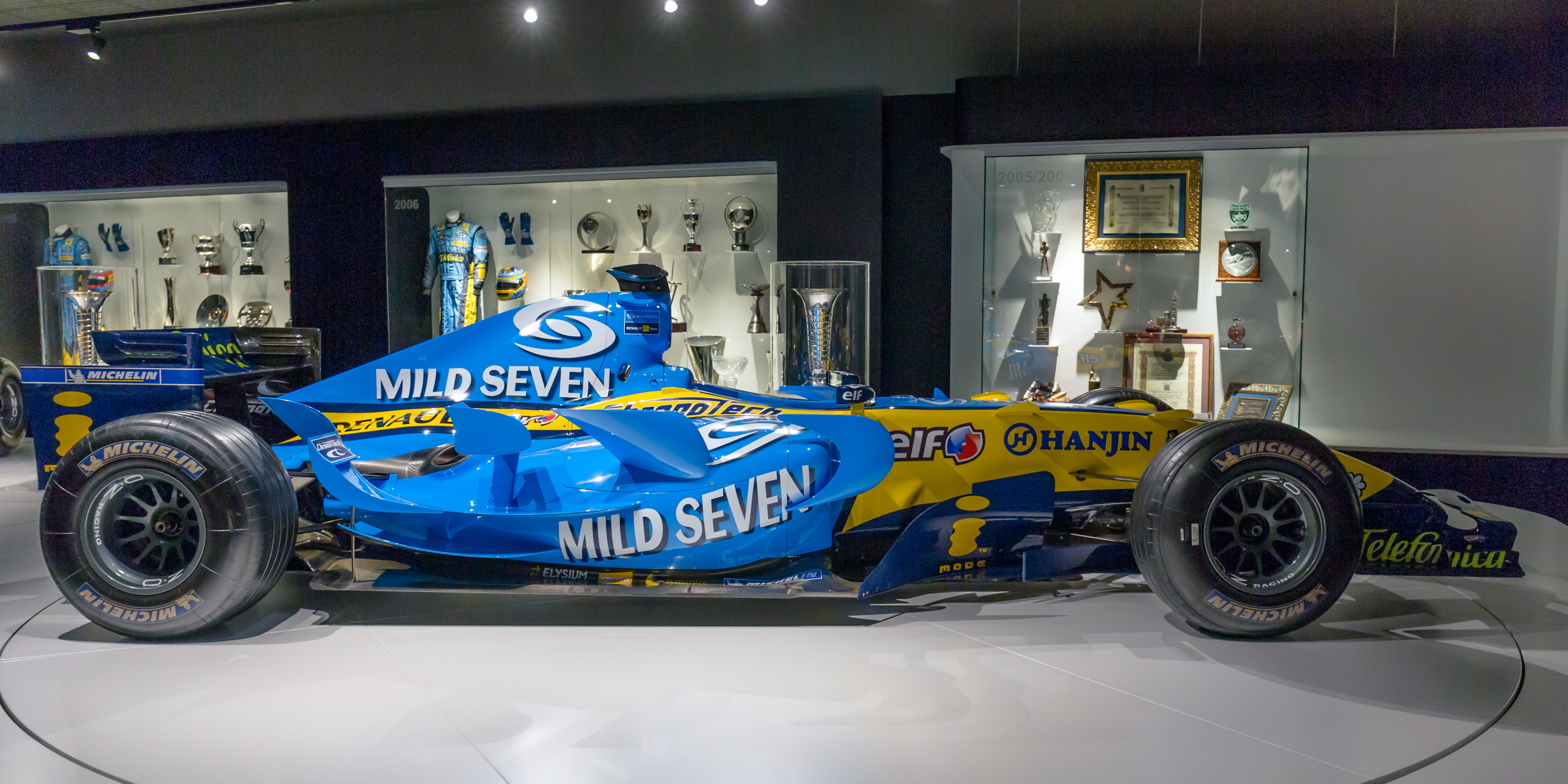
The Renault R26 with Mild Seven sponsorship, driven by Fernando Alonso during the 2006 F1 Season.

Japan Tobacco was, through Mild Seven, the title sponsor of the Enstone-based Benetton Formula One team beginning with the 1994 Formula One season. This association continued after Benetton was acquired by Renault. It was to remain with Renault F1 until the end of the 2009 Formula One season, but due to European Tobacco Regulations, the company had to end their association with Renault at the end of the 2006 Formula One season and ING became their main sponsor from 2007 onwards.

Next to Benetton and Renault, Mild Seven sponsored both Tyrrell Racing, from 1994 to 1996, and Minardi in 1997 as a result of a sponsorship deal with Japanese driver Ukyo Katayama.

For races where tobacco branding was not allowed, the logo was blocked out, replacing it with their team names. For Renault, it was replaced with "Blue World" and "Team Spirit".

=== Other sports ===
At the end of the 1990s to early 2000s, Japanese tobacco companies were not allowed to advertise their products in China due to the still lingering tensions of World War II. So Japan Tobacco decided to hold an "Eco-challenge" style adventure race – sponsored by Mild Seven cigarettes. Thus was born the "Mild Seven Outdoor Quest". Dan Morris was the official photographer for this event from 1997-2001. This event took him to a number of beautiful spots in Western China including Dali City, Lijiang and Xijiang (home of the Chinese space program). Top athletes such as Team Eco-Internet, Mike Pigg and Paula Newby-Fraser would regularly compete in this event.

In 2001, Mild Seven was the official sponsor of the "Mild Seven Pool Challenge".

== Marketing ==
During the 1980s and 1990s, JTI created various TV advertisements to promote Mild Seven cigarettes, both in English and Japanese.

Various poster advertisements were also made to advertise both Mild Seven and Mevius cigarettes.

In Hong Kong, Mild Seven also appeared on buses as an advertisement in the 1980s and 1990s.

== Markets ==
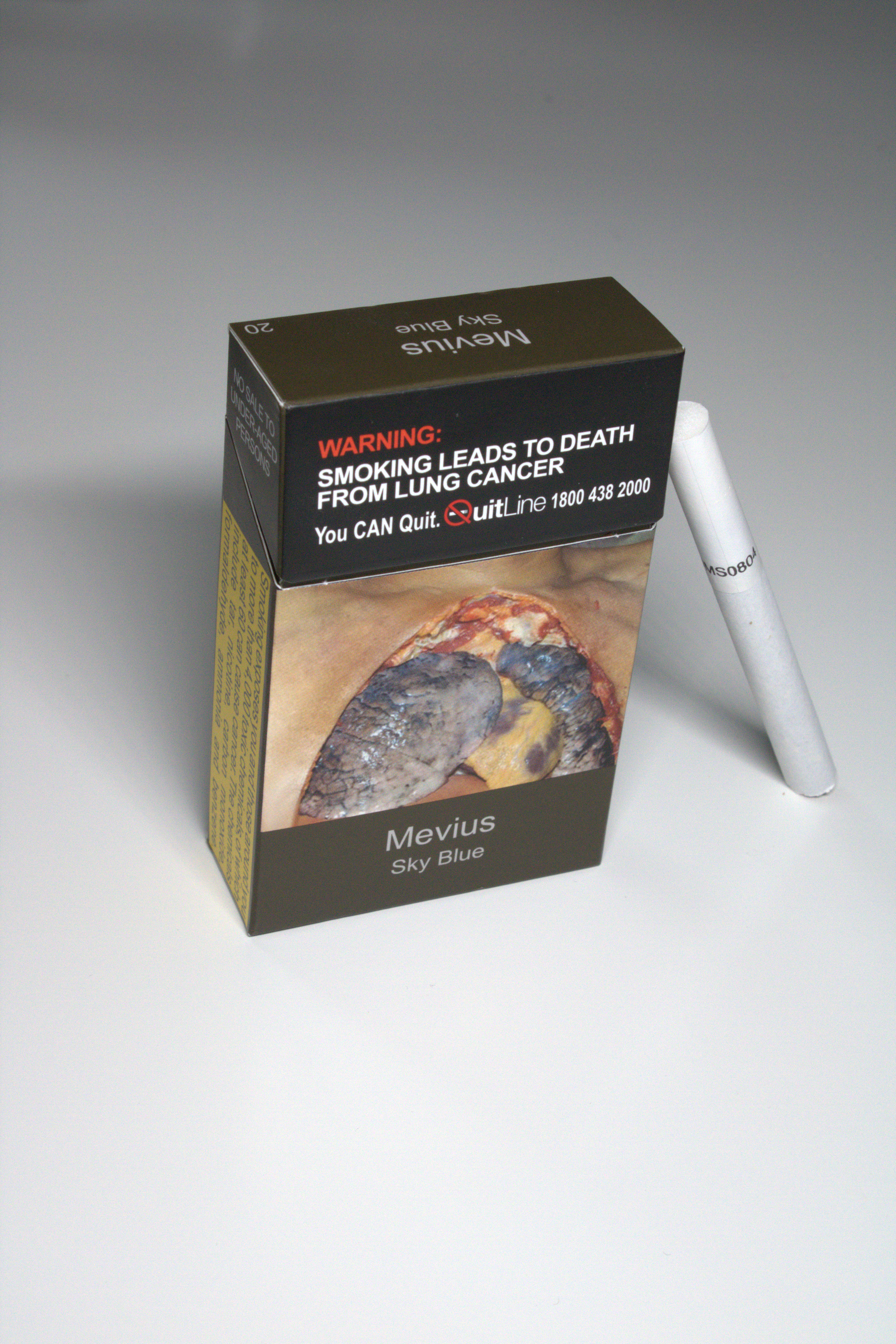
Singaporean Mevius Sky Blue in plain packaging.

Mevius is mainly sold in Japan, but also was or still is sold in the United Kingdom, Germany, Austria, Poland, Belarus, Russia, Morocco, Kazakhstan, Mongolia, Nepal, Thailand, Cambodia, Vietnam, Malaysia, Singapore, China, Taiwan, Hong Kong, Myanmar, South Korea and the United States.

== In popular culture ==
- In the anime Great Teacher Onizuka, Mild Seven are the cigarettes smoked by the protagonist Eikichi Onizuka.
- In the novel by the Japanese author Koushun Takami Battle Royale one of the protagonists, Shōgo Kawada, smokes a cigarette brand called Wild Seven, a parody of Mild Seven.
- In the manga Cat's Eyes, the clumsy inspector Matthew (Toshio) is an avid smoker of Mild Seven, who unlike other brands (such as Suzuki which becomes Zusuki) appear with the true name.
- In the manga Tobacco chan, the main female cigarette is an anthropomorphic version of Mevius Super Lights.
- In the manga series Tokyo Babylon and X by CLAMP, Mild Seven is the brand of cigarettes smoked by Seishirō Sakurazuka. His ex-lover Subaru Sumeragi later smokes Mild Seven as well.
- In the final chapter of the manga Ajin: Demi-Human, Ikuya Ogura starts smoking Mevius cigarettes.
- In the anime “Paranoia Agent” a side character smokes Mild Seven with a fictional “charcoal filter” detail written on the box.
- In the anime and manga "Chainsmoker Cat" the titular character primarily smokes Mevius cigarettes, with the logo and packaging often visible.

== See also ==
- Japan Tobacco
- Smoking in Japan

== Bibliography ==
- Assunta, M., Chapman, S., "A 'clean cigarette' for a clean nation: a case study of Salem Pianissimo in Japan", Tobacco Control 2004;13:ii58-ii62. This research paper has comparative information on the Mild Seven product.
