= Honda Fit =

Subcompact/supermini car manufactured by Honda

Honda Fit/Jazz
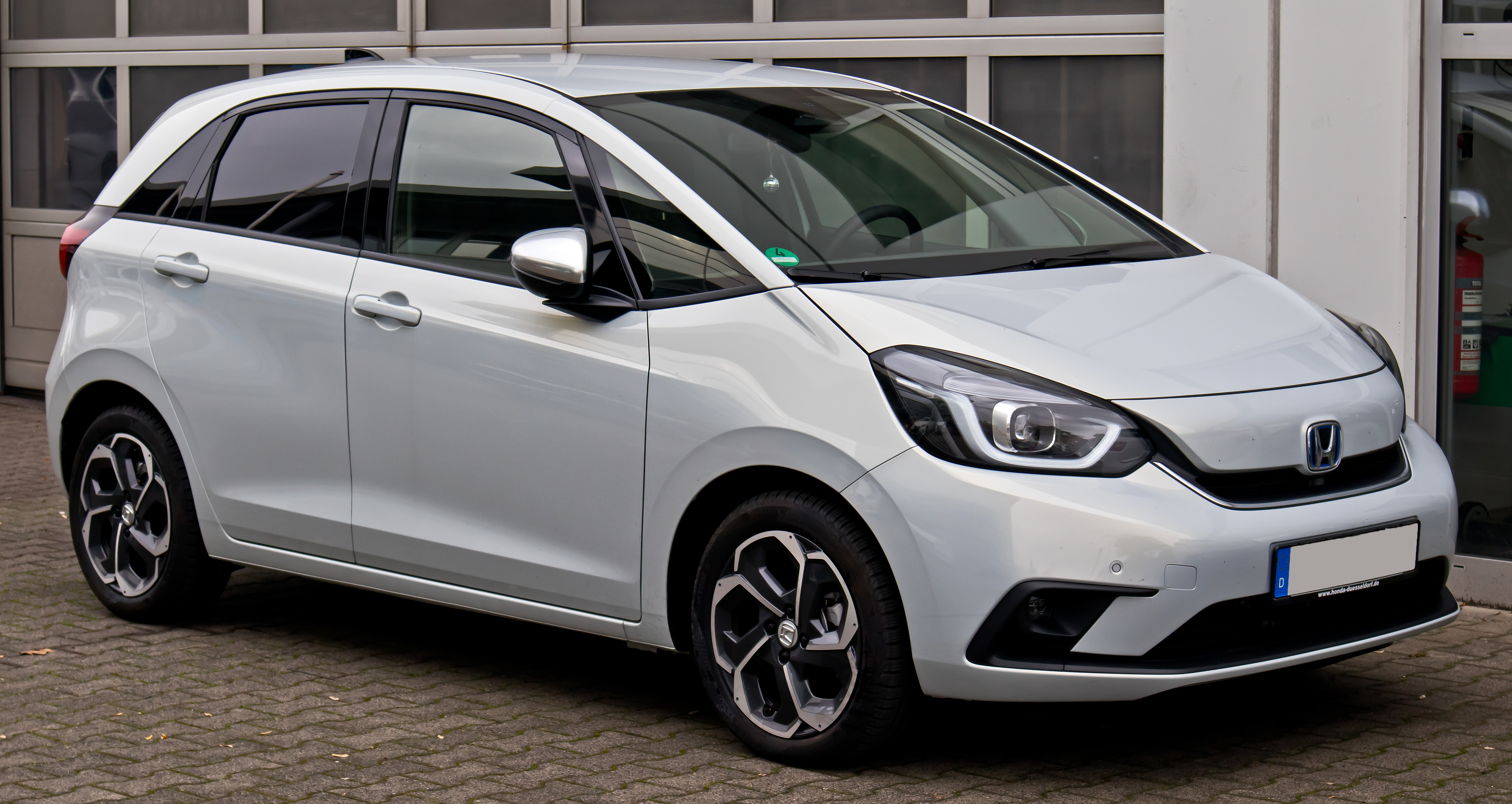

Overview
- Manufacturer: Honda
- Also called: Honda Jazz; Honda Life (China, Dongfeng Honda, 2020–2025)
- Production: June 2001 – present

Body and chassis
- Class: Subcompact car (B)
- Body style: 5-door hatchback
- Layout: Front-engine, front-wheel-drive Front-engine, four-wheel-drive (Japan)
- Platform: Honda Global Small Car

Chronology
- Predecessor: Honda Logo
- Successor: Honda City Hatchback (GN) (Southeast Asia and South America)

The Honda Fit (Japanese: ホンダ・フィット, Hepburn: Honda Fitto) or Honda Jazz is a small car manufactured and marketed by Honda since 2001 over four generations. With a five-door hatchback body style, it is considered a supermini in the United Kingdom, a subcompact car in the United States, and a light car in Australia. Marketed worldwide and manufactured at ten plants in eight countries, sales reached almost 5 million by mid-2013. Honda uses the "Jazz" nameplate in Europe, Oceania, the Middle East, Africa, Hong Kong, Macau, Southeast Asia and India; and "Fit" in Japan, Sri Lanka, China, Taiwan and the Americas.

Sharing Honda's global small car platform with the City, Airwave, first-generation Mobilio, Freed and HR-V/Vezel, the Fit is noted for its one-box or monospace design; forward-located fuel tank; configurable seats that fold in several ways to accommodate boot space in varying shapes and sizes— and boot volume competitive to larger vehicles.

Honda released hybrid petrol-electric versions of the Fit in Japan in October 2010 and in Europe in early 2011. In 2012, Honda released the Fit EV in the United States and Japan, a limited-production all-electric version based on the second-generation, widely regarded as a compliance car.

The fourth-generation model released in 2019 is sold in Japan, Europe, China, Taiwan, South Africa, Brunei and Singapore. Starting in 2020, the model was phased out in most Southeast Asian and Latin American countries, and replaced by the larger City Hatchback, while it was withdrawn entirely from the North American market because of falling demand in the subcompact segment.

== First generation (GD/GE; 2001) ==
The first-generation Fit debuted in June 2001 in Japan and subsequently was introduced in Europe (early 2002), Australia (late 2002), South America (early 2003), South Africa and Southeast Asia (2003), China (September 2004), and Mexico (late 2005). Confusingly, in Europe this Jazz is typically referred to as Mark II Jazz, especially by automotive part suppliers, the Mark I Jazz being the 1981-86 Honda City, named 'Jazz' in Europe at the time, as Opel already had rights to use the City name after having used it on a hatchback version of the Kadett C.

A production model for the United States and Canada debuted in January 2006 at the North American International Auto Show in Detroit. The car was released in Canada and the U.S. in April 2006 as a 2007 model year.

The first-generation Fit uses Honda's Global Small Car platform, which is also used by Fit Aria/City (a sedan version of the Fit), the Airwave (a station wagon version of Fit Aria/City), the Mobilio, and Mobilio Spike. Depending on the region, the Fit is available with a 1.2-, 1.3- (in Europe referred as 1.4 L model), 1.5-litre i-DSI engine, or 1.5-litre VTEC engine. All four engines are based on Honda's L-series engine family.

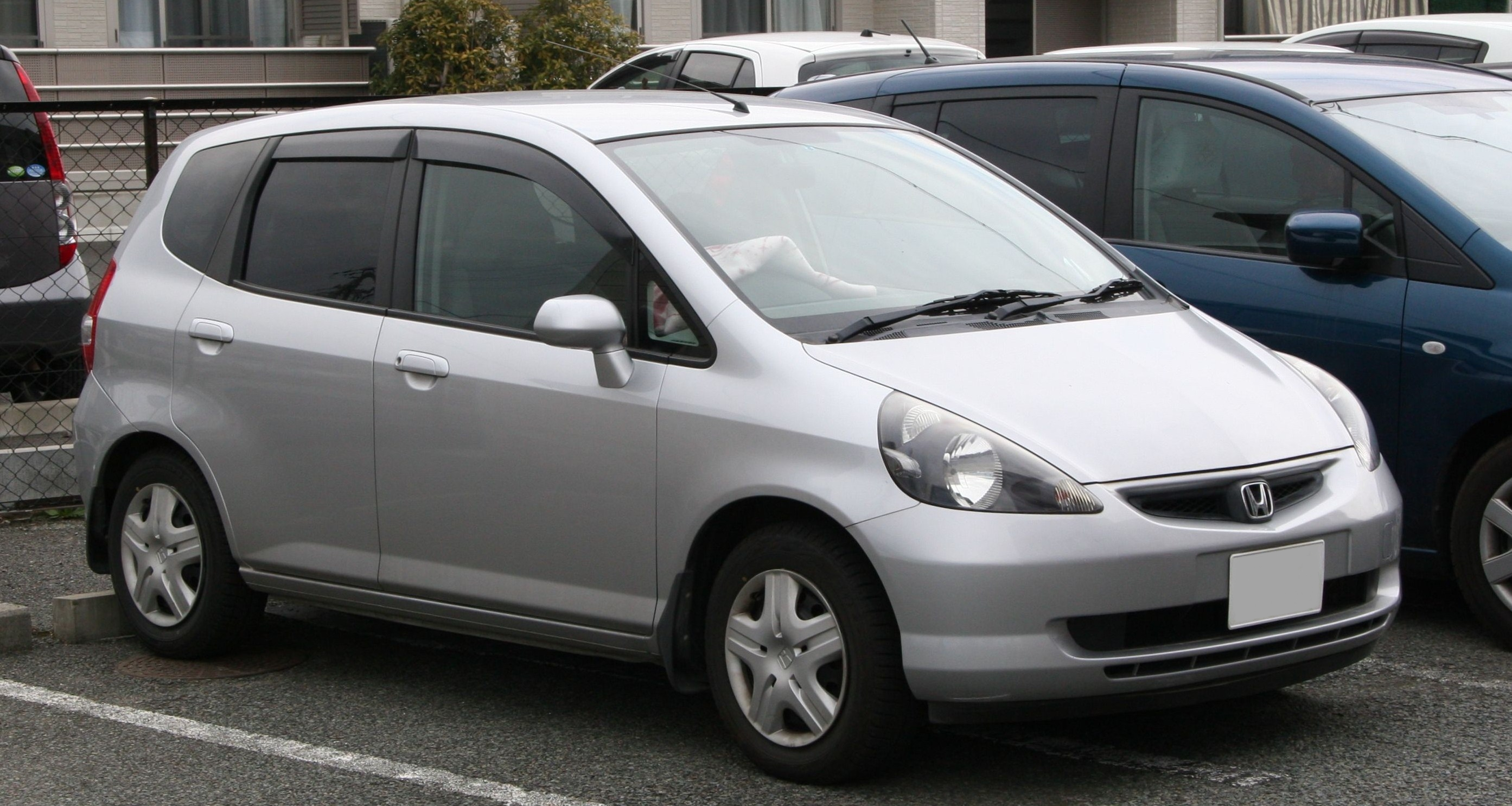
Honda Fit (Japan; pre-facelift)

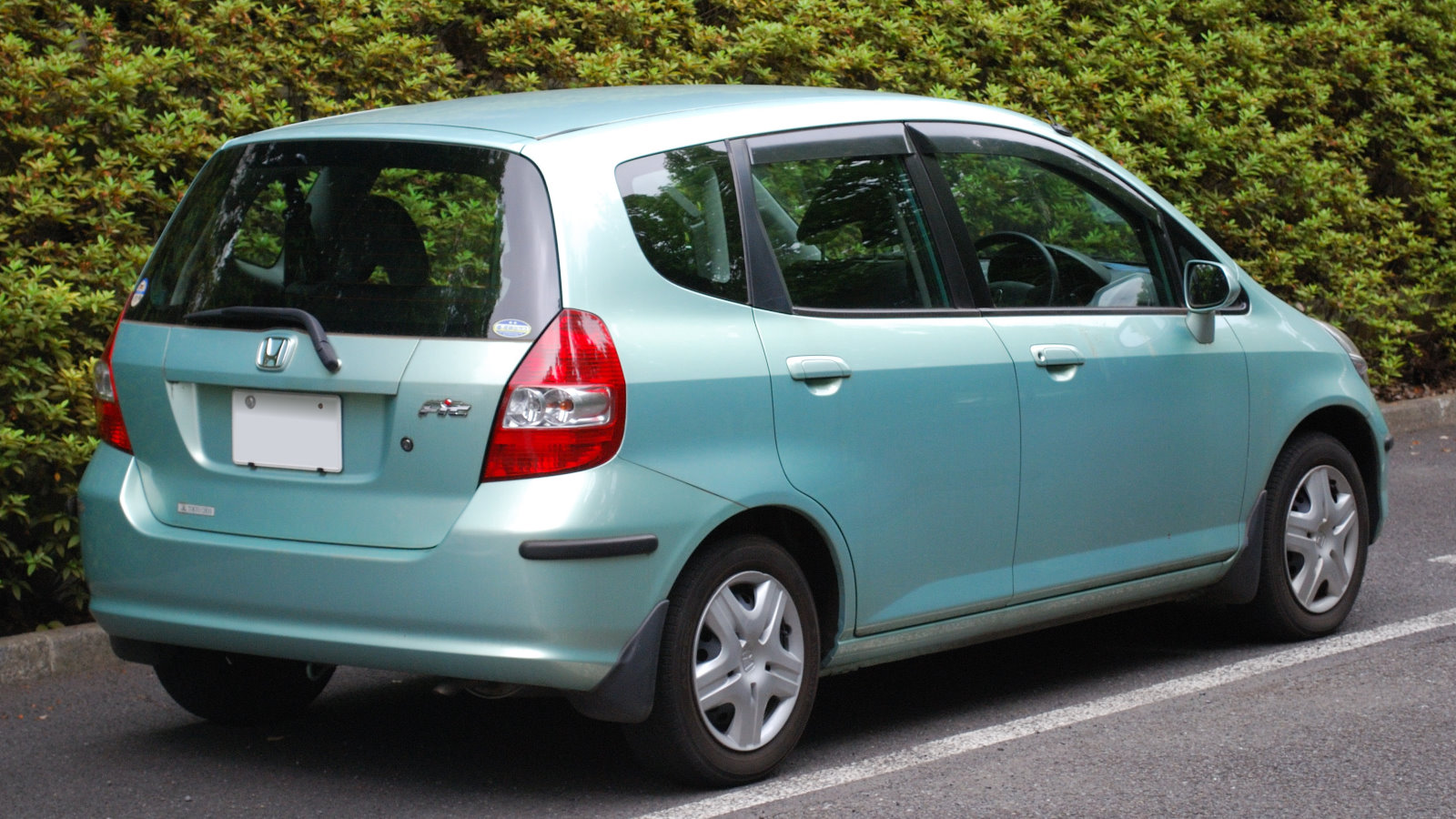
Honda Fit (Japan; pre-facelift)

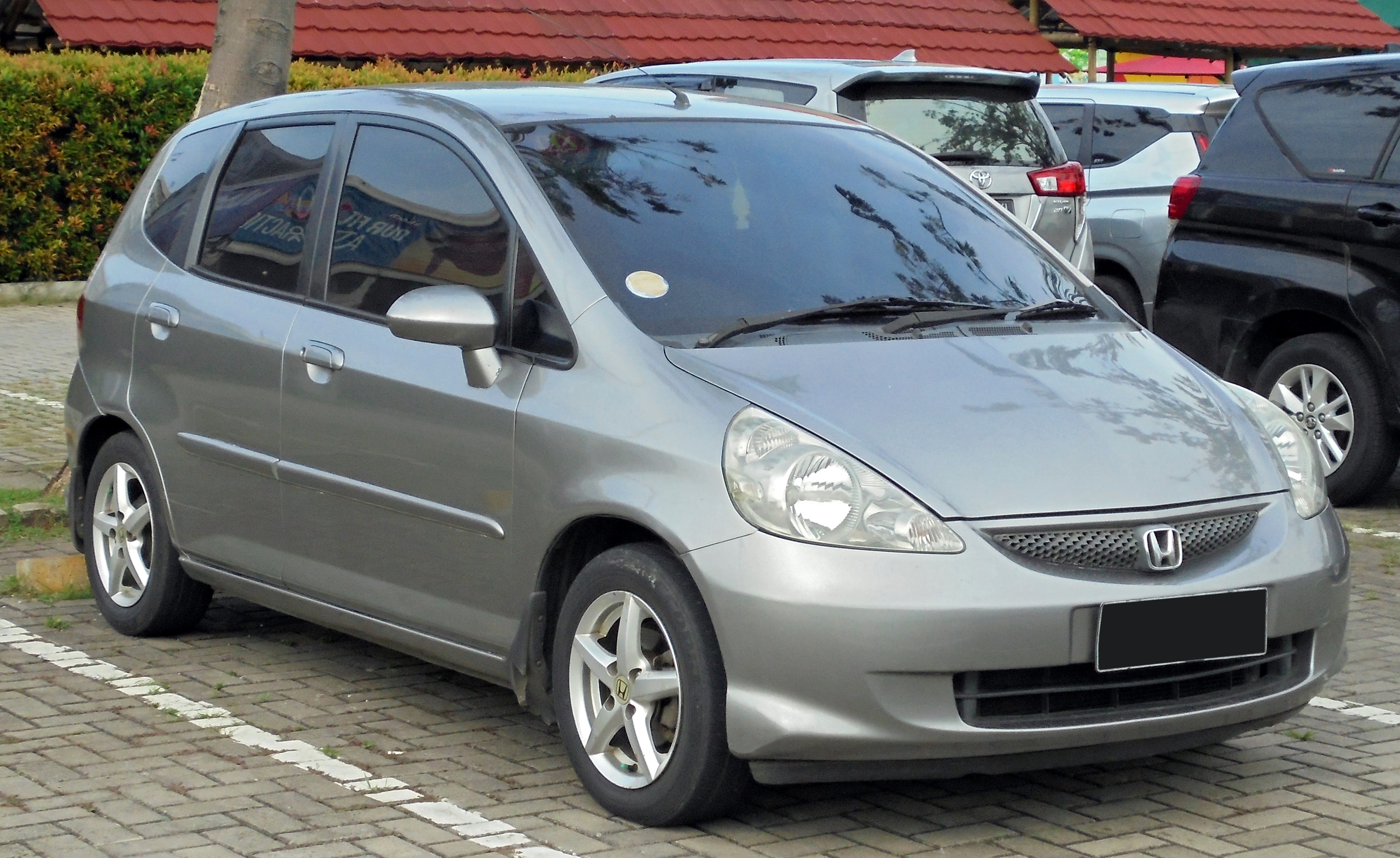
Honda Jazz (Indonesia; facelift)

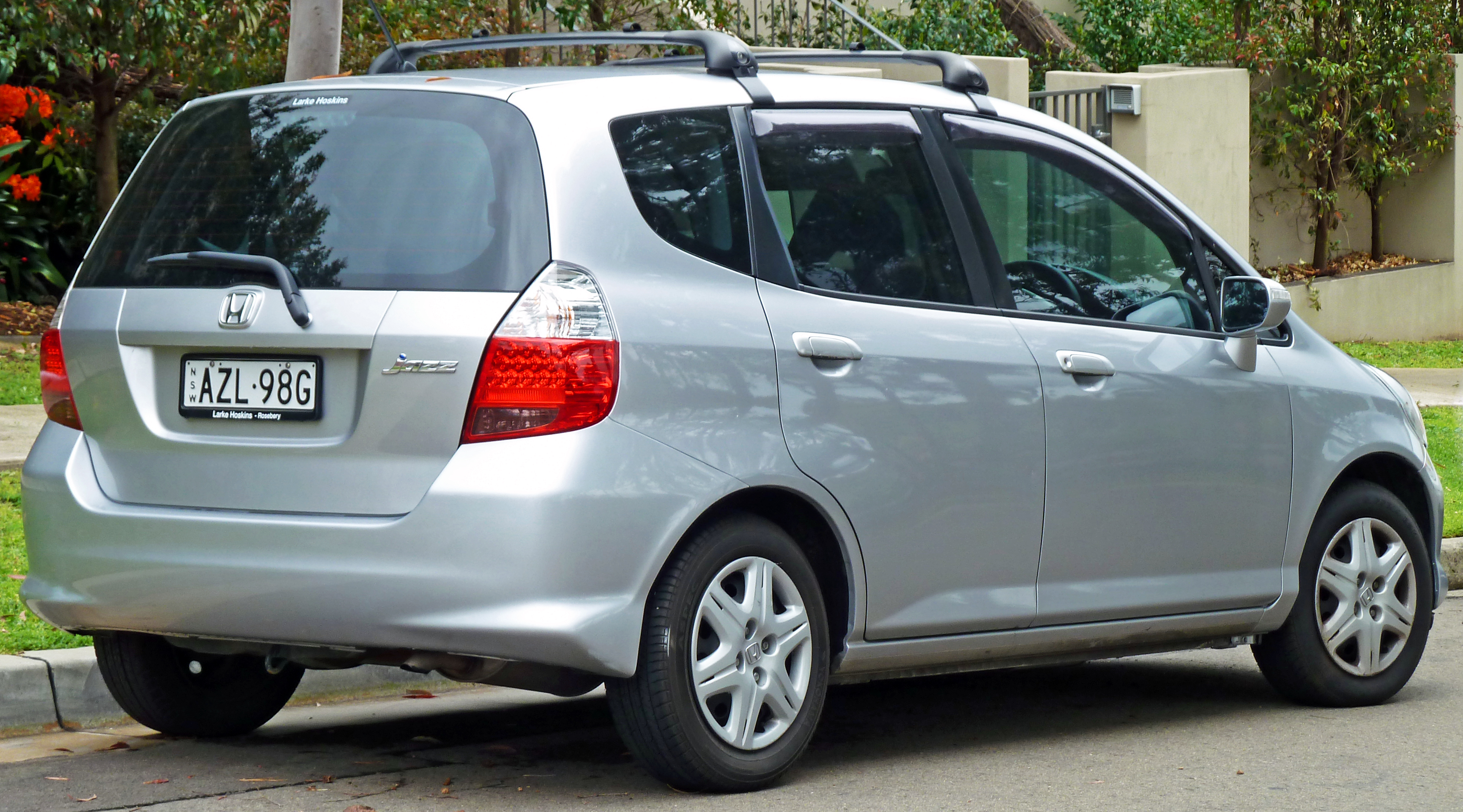
Honda Jazz (Australia; facelift)

== Second generation (GE/GG; 2007) ==
The second-generation Fit/Jazz debuted on 17 October 2007 at the 40th Tokyo Motor Show. At its introduction in 2007, it won the Car of the Year Japan Award for the second time. The vehicle offered a longer wheelbase than its predecessor and is wider and longer overall.

Two engines were offered in the second-generation Fit. A Naturally Aspirated 1.2-litre i-VTEC DOHC produces 100 PS (99 hp; 74 kW) at 6,000 rpm and 127 N⋅m (13.0 kg⋅m; 93.7 lb⋅ft) at 4,800 rpm. A 1.5-litre i-VTEC engine was also offered and produces a maximum output of 120 PS (118 hp; 88 kW) at 6,600 rpm and 145 N⋅m (14.8 kg⋅m; 107 lb⋅ft) at 4,800 rpm. The hybrid version was launched October 2010 in Japan. The Fit Hybrid featured a 1.3-litre engine and electric motor, with an estimated fuel economy of 3.3 litres per 100 kilometres (86 mpg_{‑imp}; 71 mpg_{‑US}) measured in accordance with Japanese 10–15 cycle.

Honda also showed a concept electric vehicle based on the second generation Fit in 2010. It was mass-produced as the Fit EV in 2013–2015. The 2013 model year production Fit EV was unveiled at the November 2011 Los Angeles Auto Show.

For the first time, it was also available in a station wagon body style called the Fit Shuttle. This variant was only available in the Japanese home market.

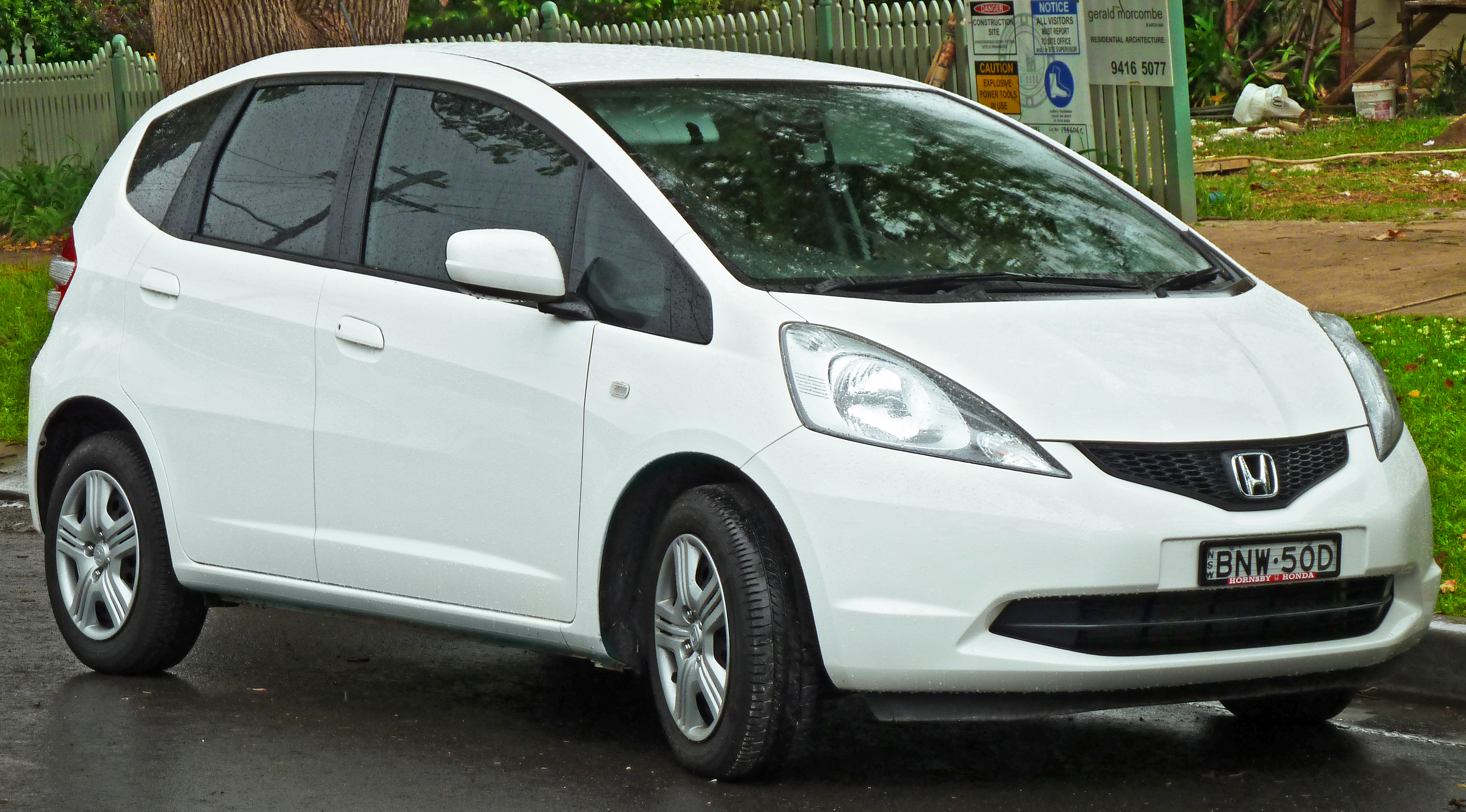
Honda Jazz (Australia; pre-facelift)

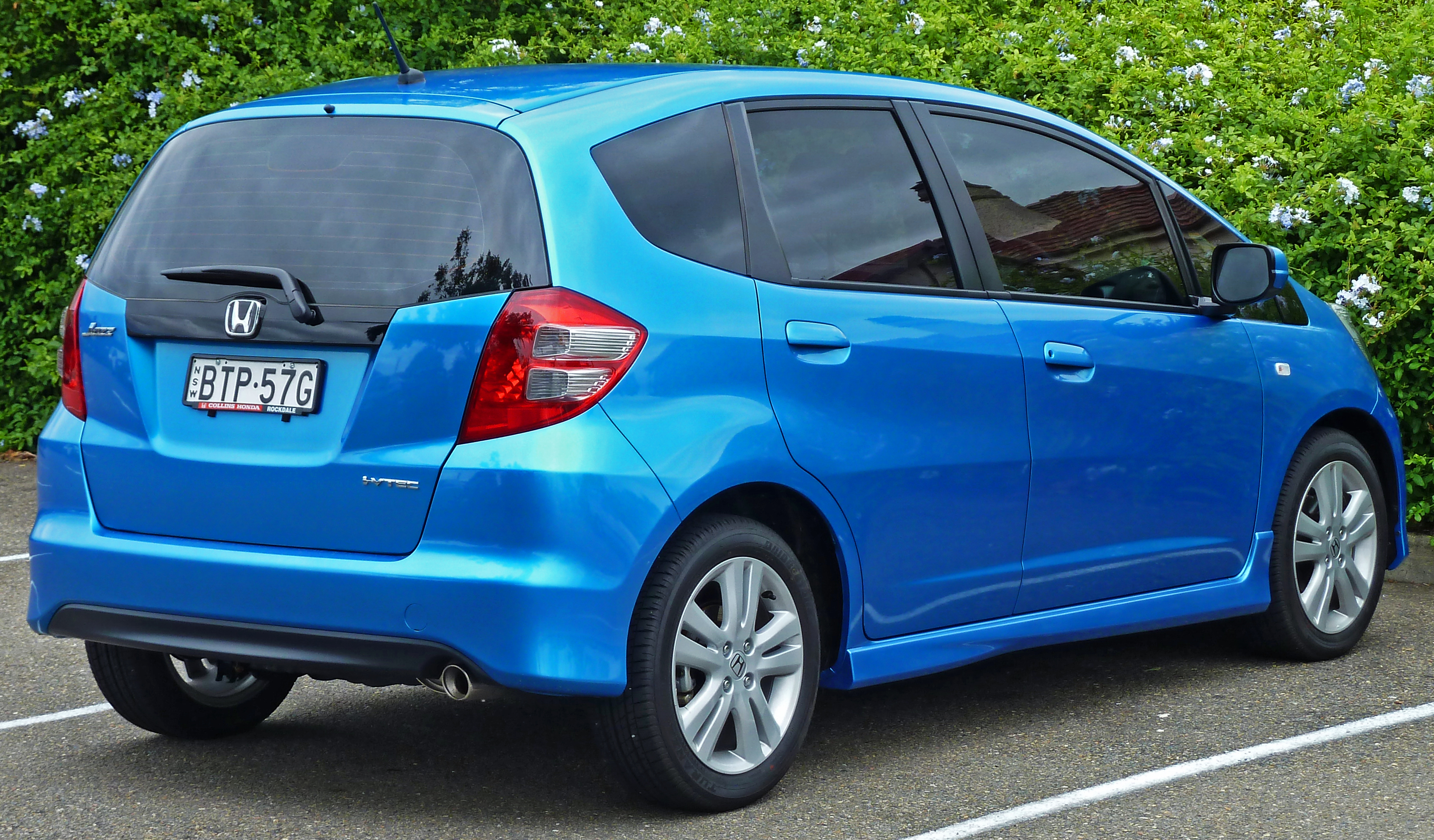
Honda Jazz (Australia; pre-facelift)

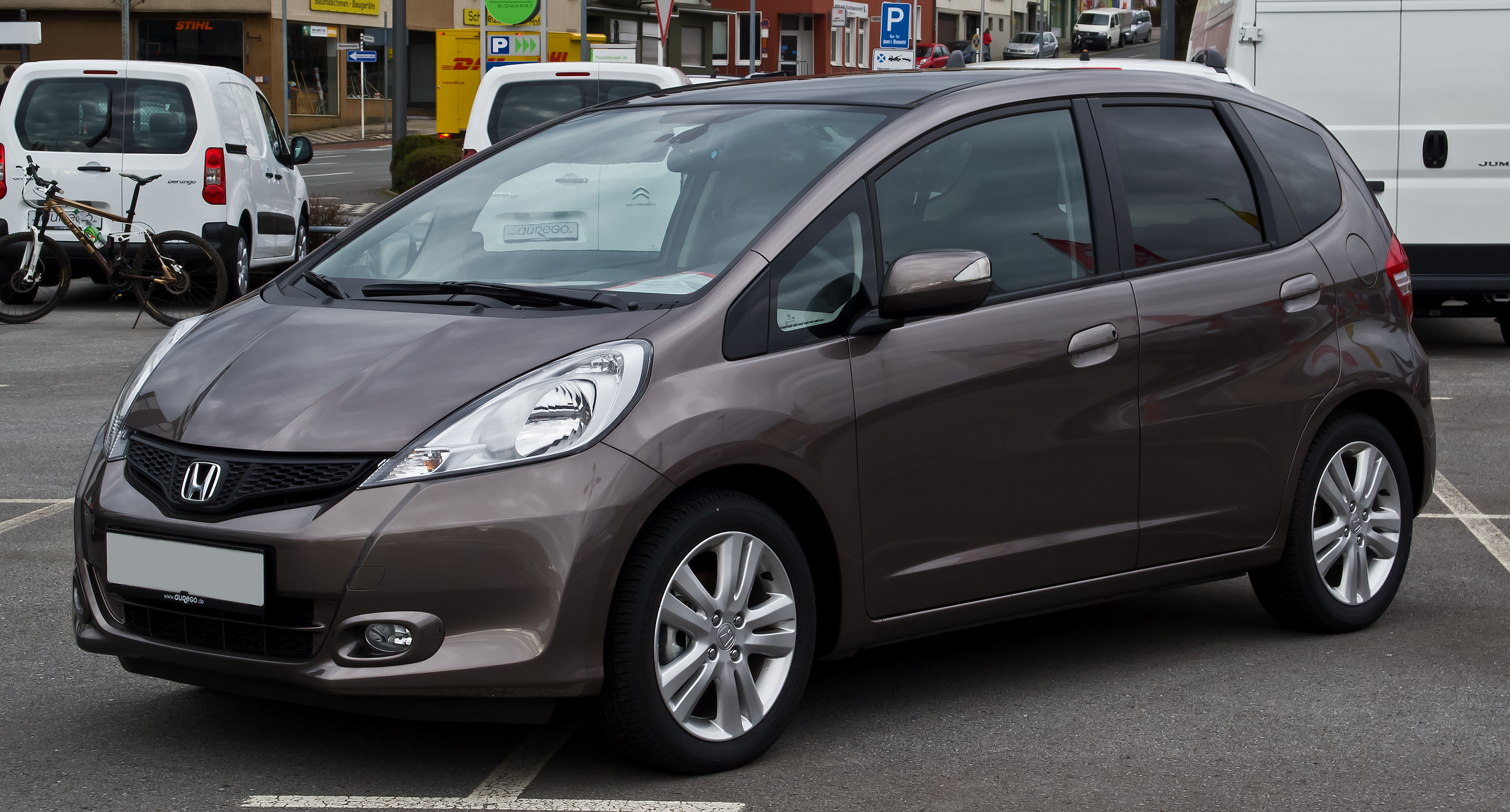
Honda Jazz (Germany; facelift)

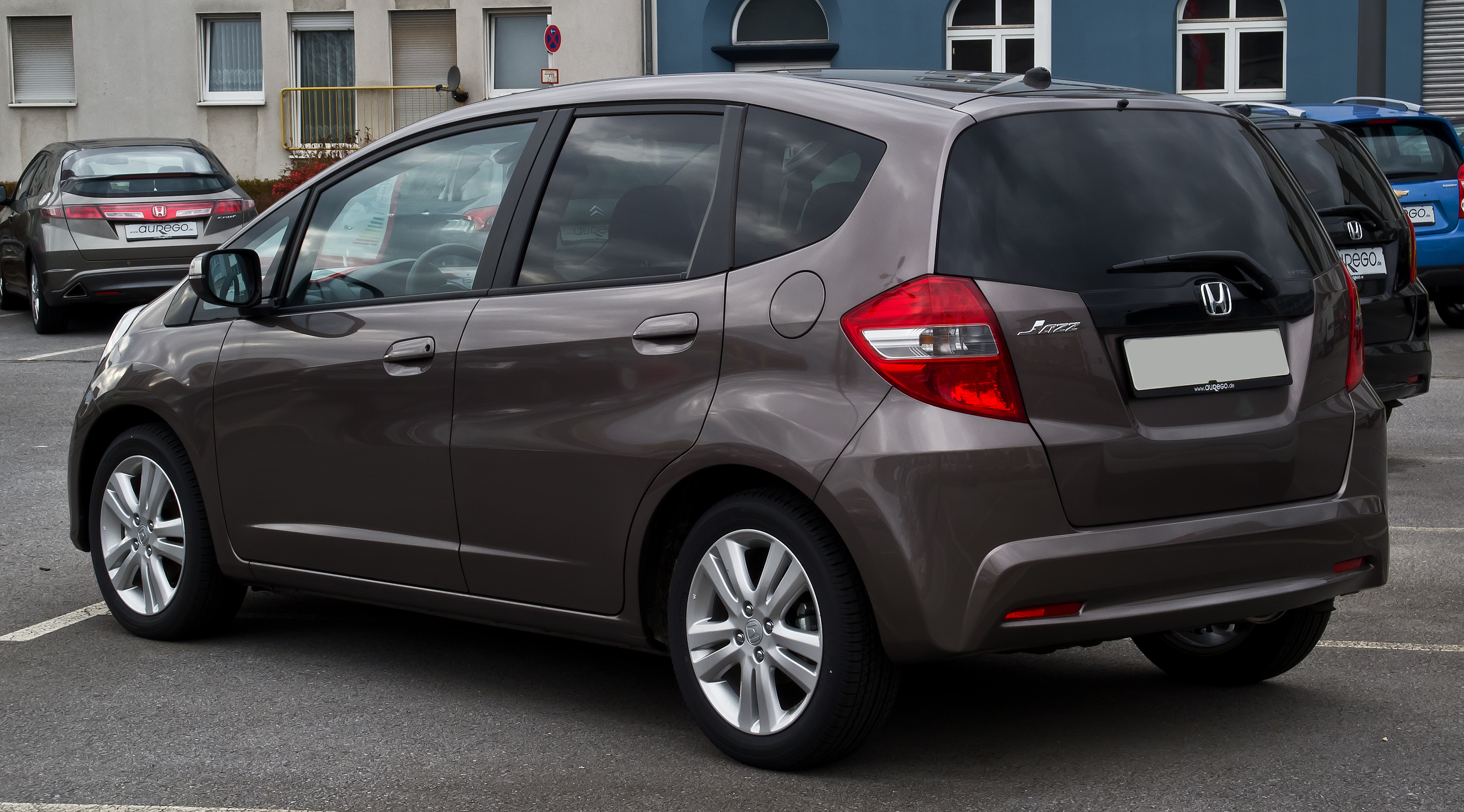
Honda Jazz (Germany; facelift)

== Third generation (GK/GH/GP; 2013) ==
Third generation
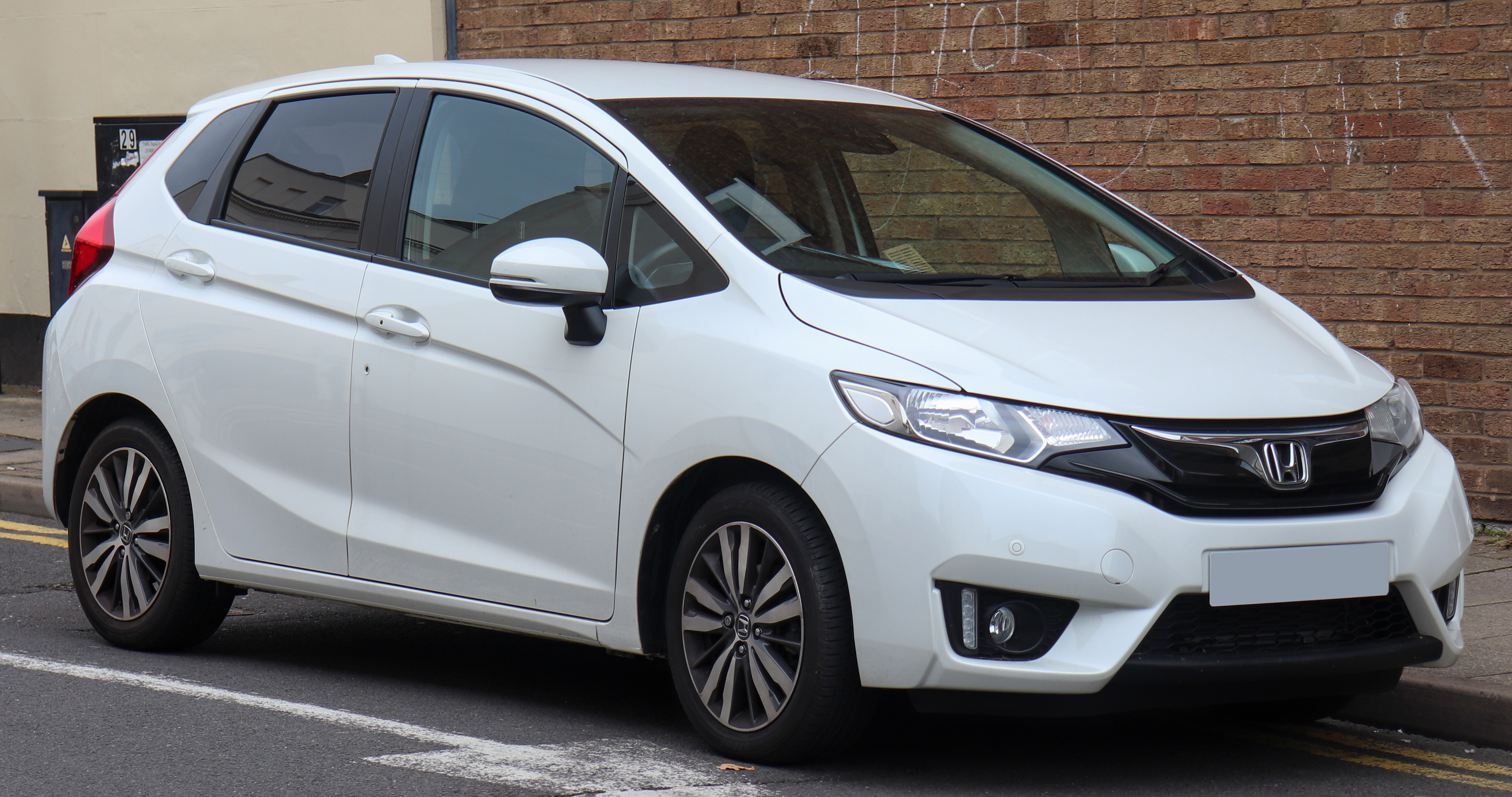
- Jazz EX Navi (UK; pre-facelift)

Overview
- Model code: GK3; GK4; GK5; GK6; GK7; GH7; GP5; GP6
- Also called: Honda Jazz
- Production: September 2013 – 2022
- Model years: 2015–2020 (North America)
- Assembly: Japan: Yorii, Saitama; Suzuka, Mie; China: Guangzhou (Guangqi Honda); Taiwan: Pingtung; Thailand: Ayutthaya; Indonesia: Karawang (HPM); Malaysia: Alor Gajah, Malacca; India: Greater Noida (HCIL); Mexico: Celaya, Guanajuato; Brazil: Sumaré, São Paulo; Itirapina, São Paulo (2019–2021)
- Designer: Toshinobu Minami and Daniel Talbert

Body and chassis
- Related: Honda Shuttle; Honda WR-V (first generation); Honda City/Ballade (sixth generation); Honda Vezel/HR-V (second generation); Honda Freed (second generation)

Powertrain
- Engine: Petrol: 1.2 L L12B4 SOHC i-VTEC I4; 1.3 L L13B DOHC i-VTEC Earth Dreams I4; 1.5 L L15A7 SOHC i-VTEC I4; 1.5 L L15Z1 i-VTEC Earth Dreams I4; 1.5 L L15Z SOHC i-VTEC I4; Petrol hybrid: 1.5 L LEB I4; Diesel: 1.5 L N15A1 i-DTEC Earth Dreams I4 Common rail turbo (India)
- Transmission: 5-speed manual; 6-speed manual; 7-speed DCT; CVT
- Hybrid drivetrain: Parallel hybrid

Dimensions
- Wheelbase: 2,530 mm (99.6 in)
- Length: 3,955–4,100 mm (155.7–161.4 in)
- Width: 1,695 mm (66.7 in)
- Height: 1,525–1,550 mm (60.0–61.0 in)
- Curb weight: 1,020–1,080 kg (2,249–2,381 lb); 1,080–1,230 kg (2,381–2,712 lb) (Hybrid); 1,130–1,150 kg (2,491–2,535 lb) (diesel)

Chronology
- Successor: Honda City hatchback (GN) (Southeast Asia and South America)

The third-generation Fit/Jazz retains the overall design concept of previous generations, notably the centre-located fuel tank and multi-configuration interior concept, marketed as "Magic Seat". The model also debuted Honda's updated design language dubbed "Exciting H Design".

Honda's all-new Global Small Car Platform employs ultra-high strength 780 MPa yield steel for 27 percent of the bodywork and has a shorter overall length by 4 cm (1.6 in), a 3 cm (1.2 in) longer wheelbase, increased rear legroom by 12.2 cm (4.8 in) and passenger volume increased by 136 L (4.8 cu ft) compared to the previous generation.

Body panels are both welded and bolted to the frame in a hybrid monocoque and spaceframe fusion — and rear torsion beam suspension is more compact, no longer using an anti-sway bar to maximize interior and boot space. The second-generation HR-V shares its platform with the third-generation Fit/Jazz.

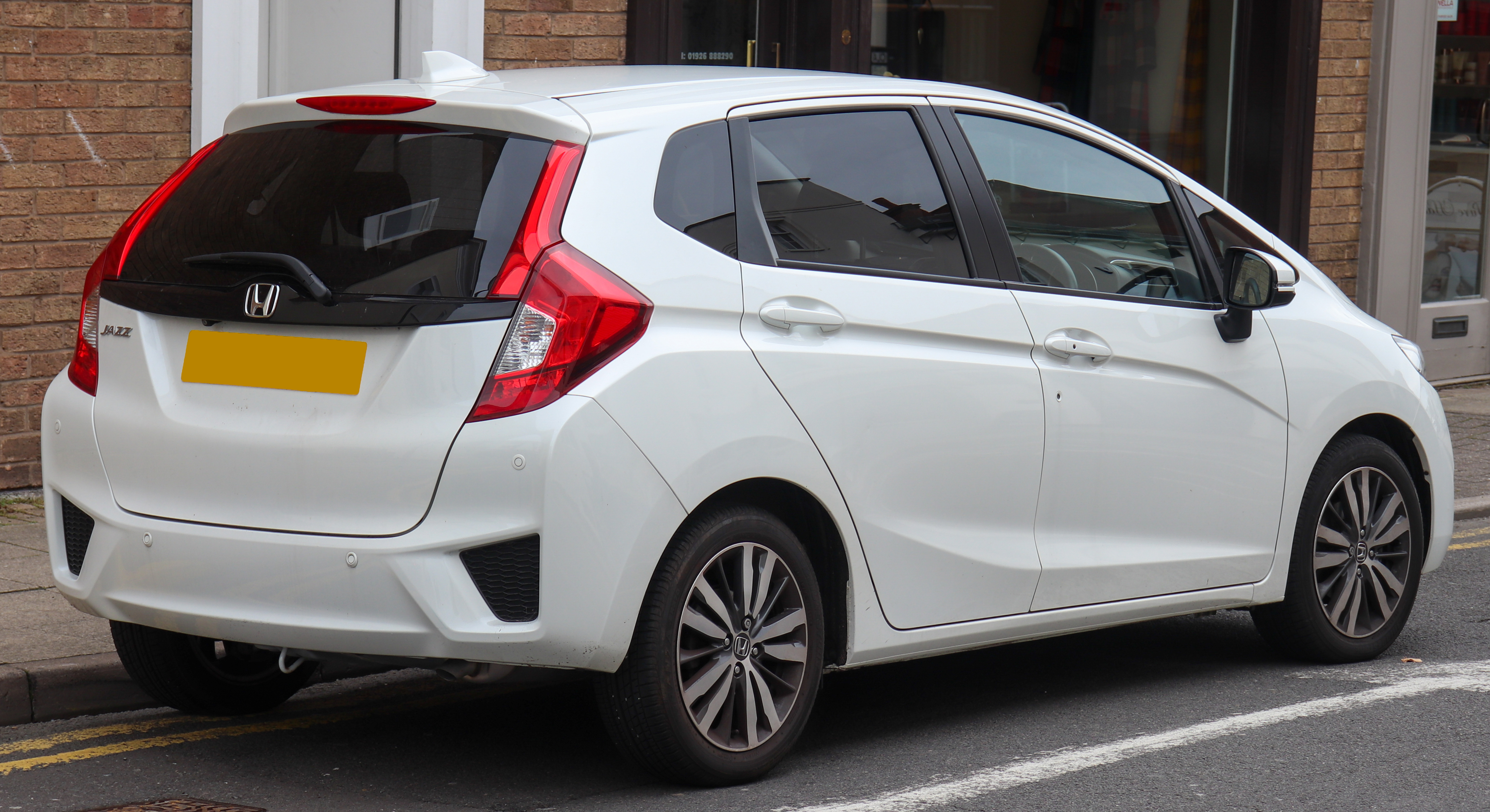
Jazz EX Navi (UK; pre-facelift)

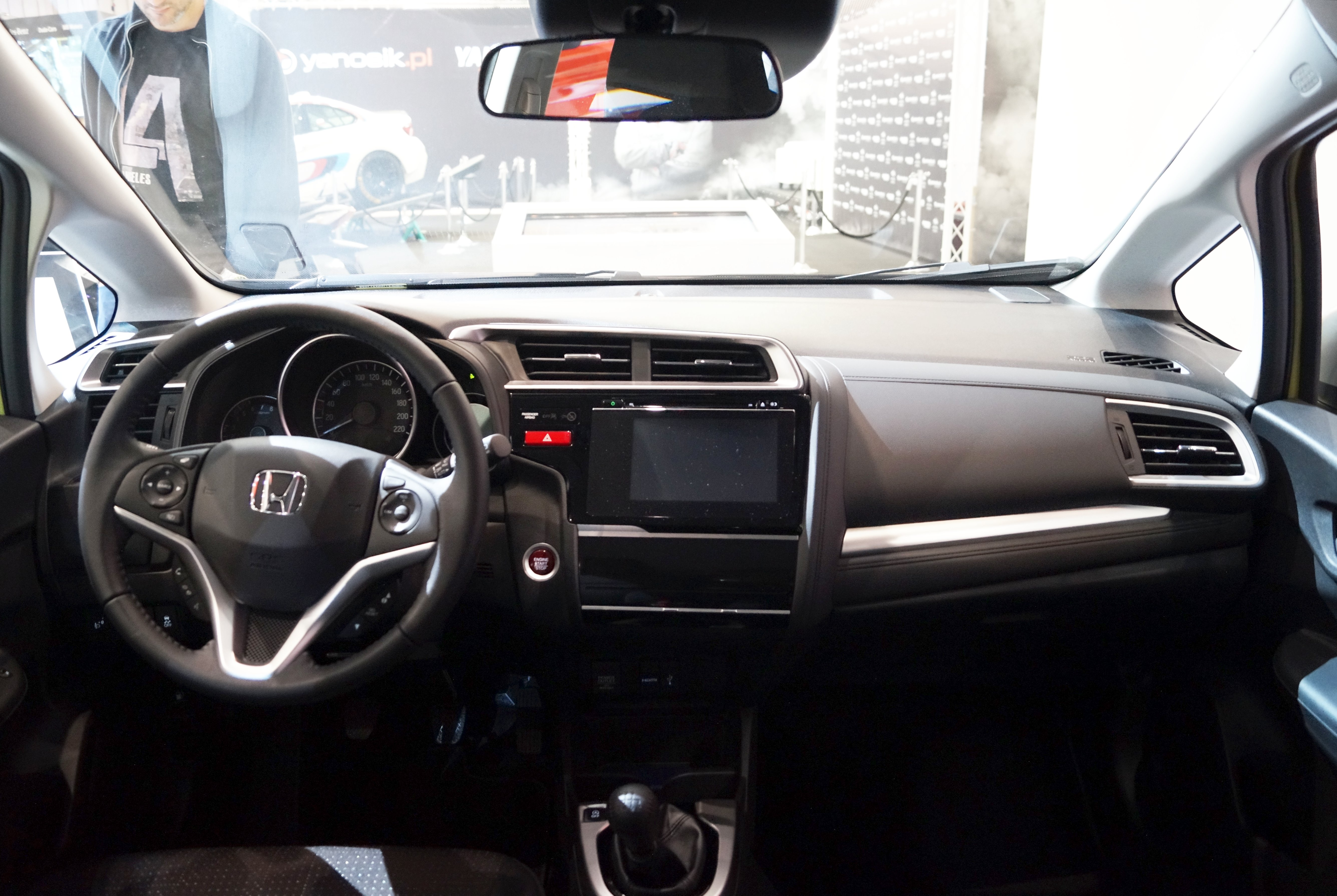
Interior

=== Hybrid ===
The Fit/Jazz Hybrid was only marketed in Japan and Malaysia for the third-generation model. It is the first model to be equipped with the "Sport Hybrid" Intelligent Dual Clutch Drive (i-DCD) system, Honda's lightweight and compact one-motor hybrid technology for small vehicles that replaces the previous Integrated Motor Assist (IMA) hybrid system.

The system uses an Earth Dreams 1.5-litre Atkinson cycle DOHC i-VTEC direct injection engine rated at 97 kW (132 PS; 130 hp) and 156 N⋅m (15.9 kg⋅m; 115 lb⋅ft) paired with a 7-speed dual-clutch transmission and an internal high-output motor, IPU (Intelligent Power Unit) with lithium-ion battery, electric servo braking system with variable servo ratio control. The electric motor, a Honda H1 motor, is rated at 22 kW (30 PS; 30 hp) and 160 N⋅m (16.3 kg⋅m; 118 lb⋅ft). The system is shared with the first-generation Vezel and Grace Hybrid.

Compared to the outgoing IMA hybrid, the new hybrid can run fully on electric while driving, making it on par with Toyota Prius. Japanese cycle fuel consumption is rated 36.4 km/L (2.75 L/100 km; 86 mpg_{‑US}) for the initial model, a 35 percent improvement over the predecessor model, while its boot capacity is 470 litres.

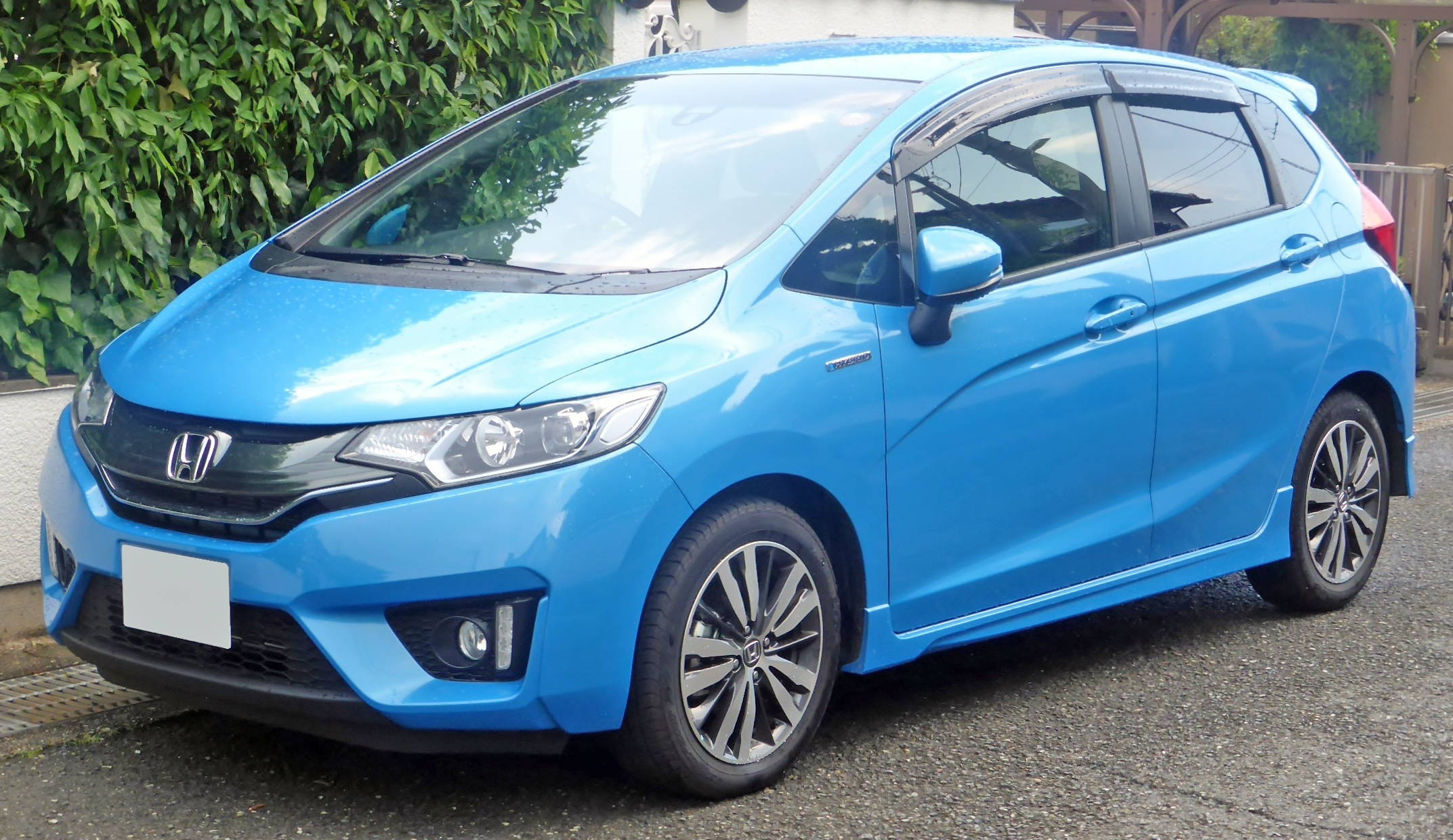
Fit Hybrid F Package (Japan; pre-facelift)

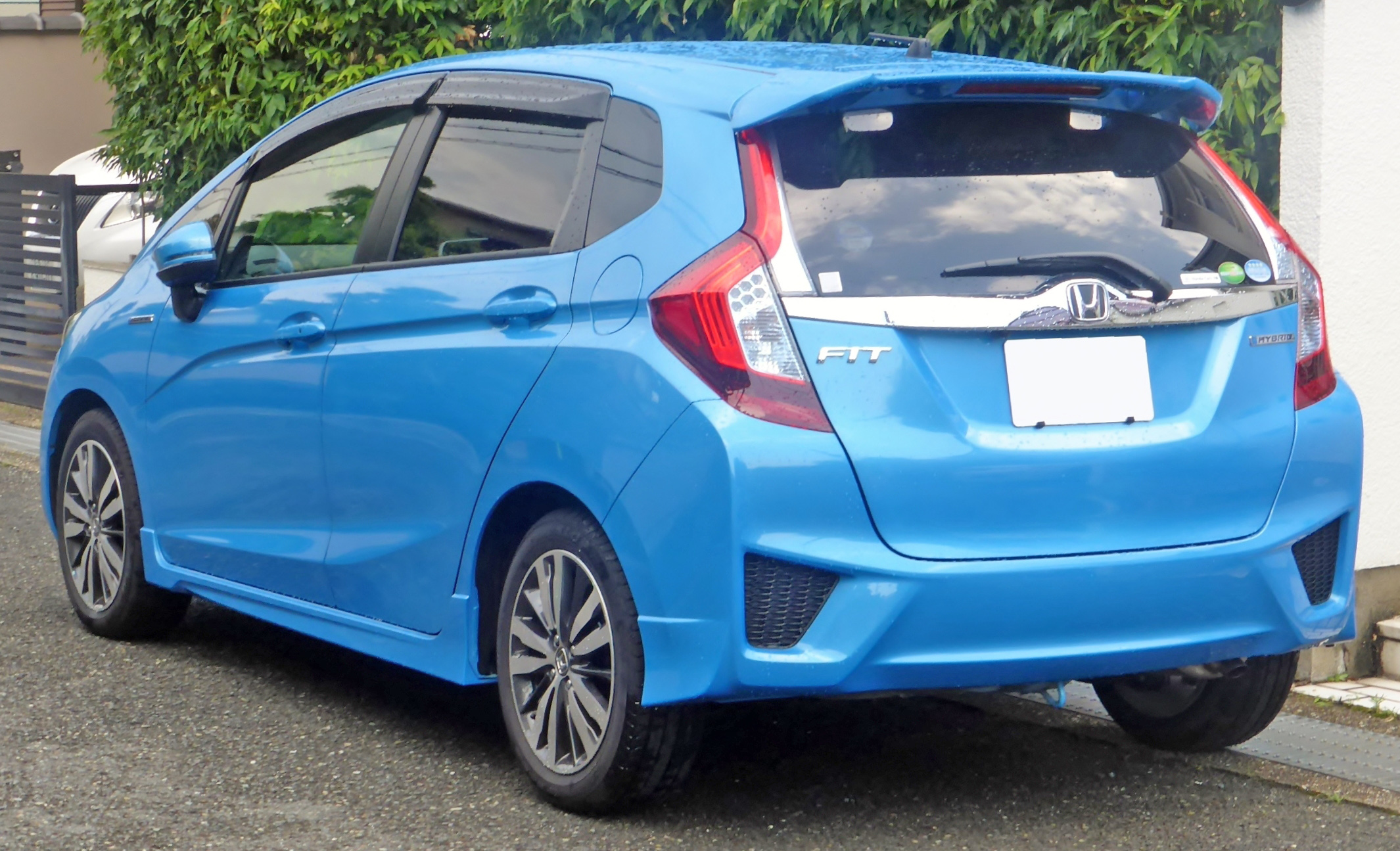
Fit Hybrid S Package (Japan; pre-facelift)

=== Markets ===
==== Thailand ====
The third-generation Jazz was launched by honda automobile (Thailand) on 18 June 2014. It is equipped with the non-direct-injected 1.5-litre L15Z2 i-vtec SOHC engine with 5 speed manual transmission and new earth dream CVT Transmission. offered in five trims: S (Manual, CVT), V (CVT), V+ (CVT) SV (CVT) and SV+ (addition side and curtain airbag)

==== India ====
The third-generation Jazz was released in India on 8 July 2015. The Indian market third-generation Jazz is powered with a 1.2-litre L12B i-VTEC motor rated at 90 PS (89 hp; 66 kW), and a 1.5-litre N15 i-DTEC diesel engine rated at 100 PS (99 hp; 74 kW). In 2015, the Indian Jazz contains 95% local parts. The updated model was released in August 2020. Production and sales of the Jazz in India ended in late 2022.

==== Indonesia ====
The third-generation Jazz was launched by Honda Prospect Motor on 26 June 2014. It is equipped with the non-direct-injected 1.5-litre L15ZC engine and offered in three trims: the A, S, and RS, with either manual or CVT transmission, and a special edition called Black Top Limited Edition which was launched at the 22nd Indonesia International Motor Show in September 2014.

==== Japan ====
The third-generation Fit was launched in Japan on 5 September 2013. Available in 3 grades: 13G, 15X, RS.

The petrol engine variant are offered in 2 different models: the 13G was equipped with 1.3-Litre L13B DOHC i-VTEC paired to a 5-speed manual and Earth Dreams CVT, the 15X and RS was equipped with 1.5-litre L15Z DOHC i-VTEC. The RS grade was offered in 6-speed manual and Earth Dreams CVT.

The Hybrid version are offered in 4 grades: Hybrid, F Package, L Package, and S Package.

==== Malaysia ====
The Malaysian-market third-generation Jazz is available in S, E, and V trims. Regardless of trim level, all variants get a non-direct-injected 1.5-litre L15Z SOHC i-VTEC engine paired to an Earth Dreams CVT.

Honda launched the facelifted Jazz and its Hybrid version in June 2017. Malaysia is the only country other than Japan to sell the Jazz Sport Hybrid. Honda gives 8-year unlimited mileage warranty on the battery.

Production in Malaysia ceased in October 2021. Like in most Southeast Asian countries, the new City Hatchback served as the Jazz replacement for Malaysian market.

==== North America ====
The U.S. model debuted at the 2014 North American International Auto Show and went on sale in June 2014 for the 2015 model year. The third-generation model replaced the previous SOHC engine with a 1.5-litre DOHC i-VTEC engine featuring direct injection and an intake cam using continuously variable cam phasing with a variable lift dual cam lobe profile. Transmission options include a 6-speed manual or continuously variable transmission (CVT) with available paddle shifters adopted from the Civic.

Unlike the previous generation, the third generation was marketed in four trim levels: LX, EX, EX-L, and EX-L with Navigation. The Canadian trim levels included the DX, LX, EX, and EX-L with Navigation. For the first time, leather seating was introduced to the North American Fit through the EX-L trim. The facelift in 2018 also added the Sport trim which sits between the LX and EX trims, with underbody spoiler, exhaust finisher, and orange stitching to cloth seats. All Fit trim levels included a multi-angle rear-view backup camera; higher trims include dynamic guidelines. Honda's LaneWatch passenger side-view mirror camera was also optional.

This was the final generation of the Fit marketed in North America. A commemorative edition for the Mexican market named "Final Edition" was launched on 1 December 2020 in Azul Sport (Sport Blue) colour, with side wings, a rear spoiler, and a commemorative plaque.

==== Philippines ====
In the Philippines, the third-generation Honda Jazz was launched in 2014. Three variants were available. Base V available in 5 speed manual and CVT while the VX and VX+ variants are only available in CVT. In 2017 the VX+ was replaced by the RS variant as the top of the line variant for the face lifted Jazz.

=== Facelift ===
The third-generation Fit/Jazz received a facelift, which was unveiled in Japan on 12 May 2017, and went on sale on 29 June 2017. It features new bumpers, a revised radio with carplay, and LED headlights with daytime running lights incorporated into the headlights. It was also revealed in Thailand on 19 May 2017, followed by Malaysia on 6 June 2017, and the Philippines on 17 July 2017. The U.S. model was revealed on 12 June 2017, for the 2018 model year. The facelifted third-generation Jazz RS was also launched in Indonesia on 26 July 2017.

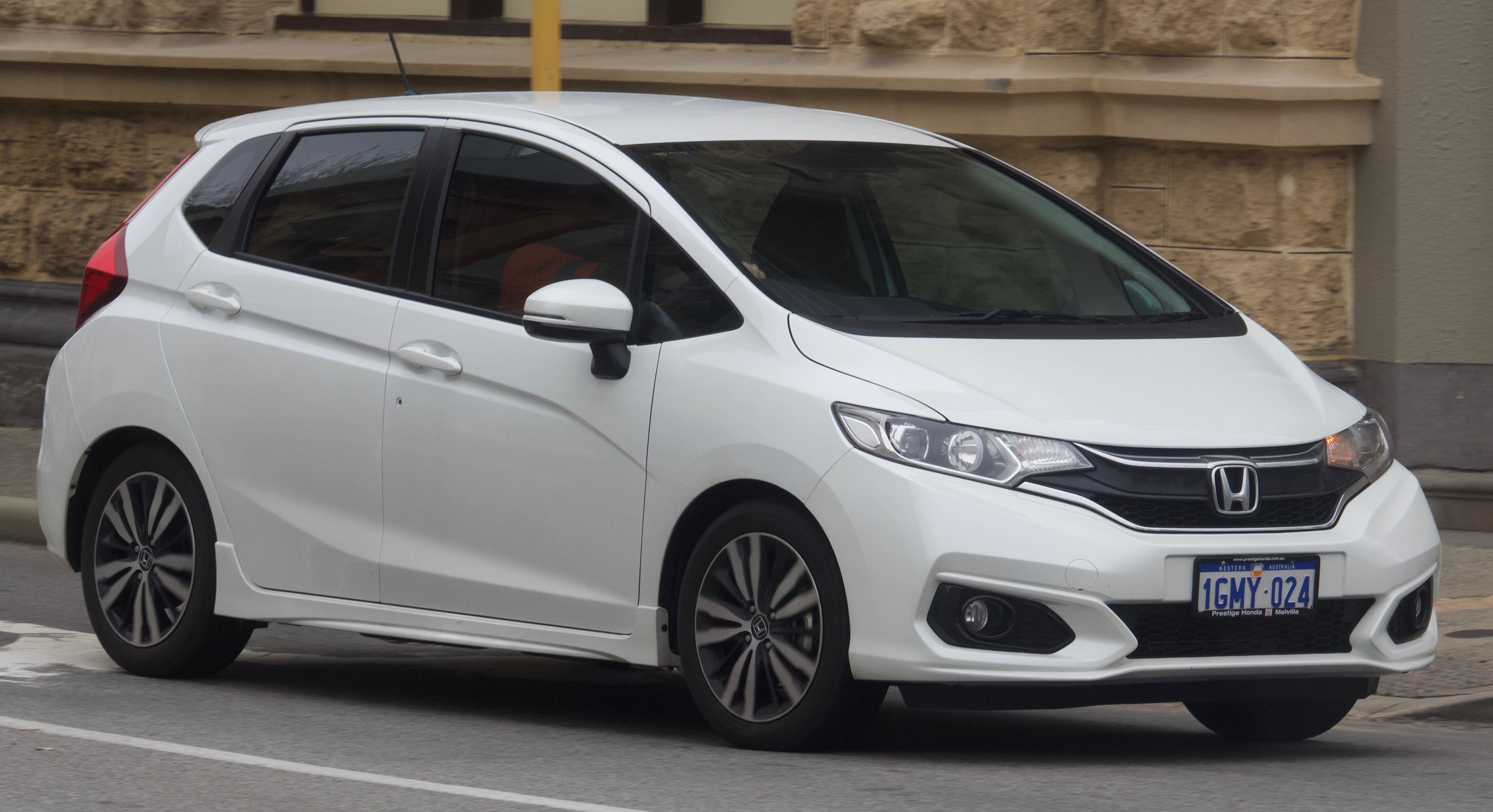
Jazz VTi-S (Australia; facelift)

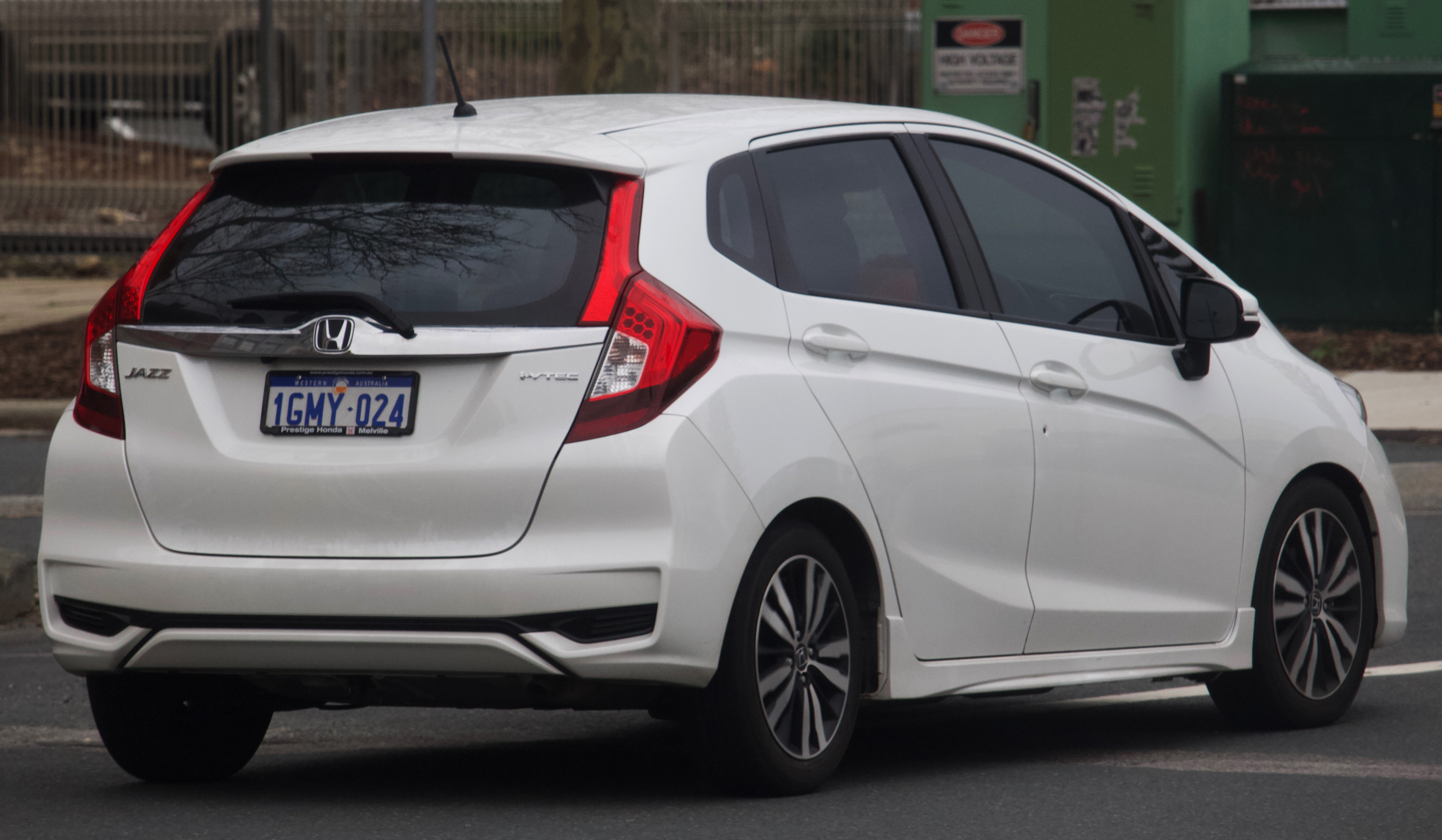
Jazz VTi-S (Australia; facelift)

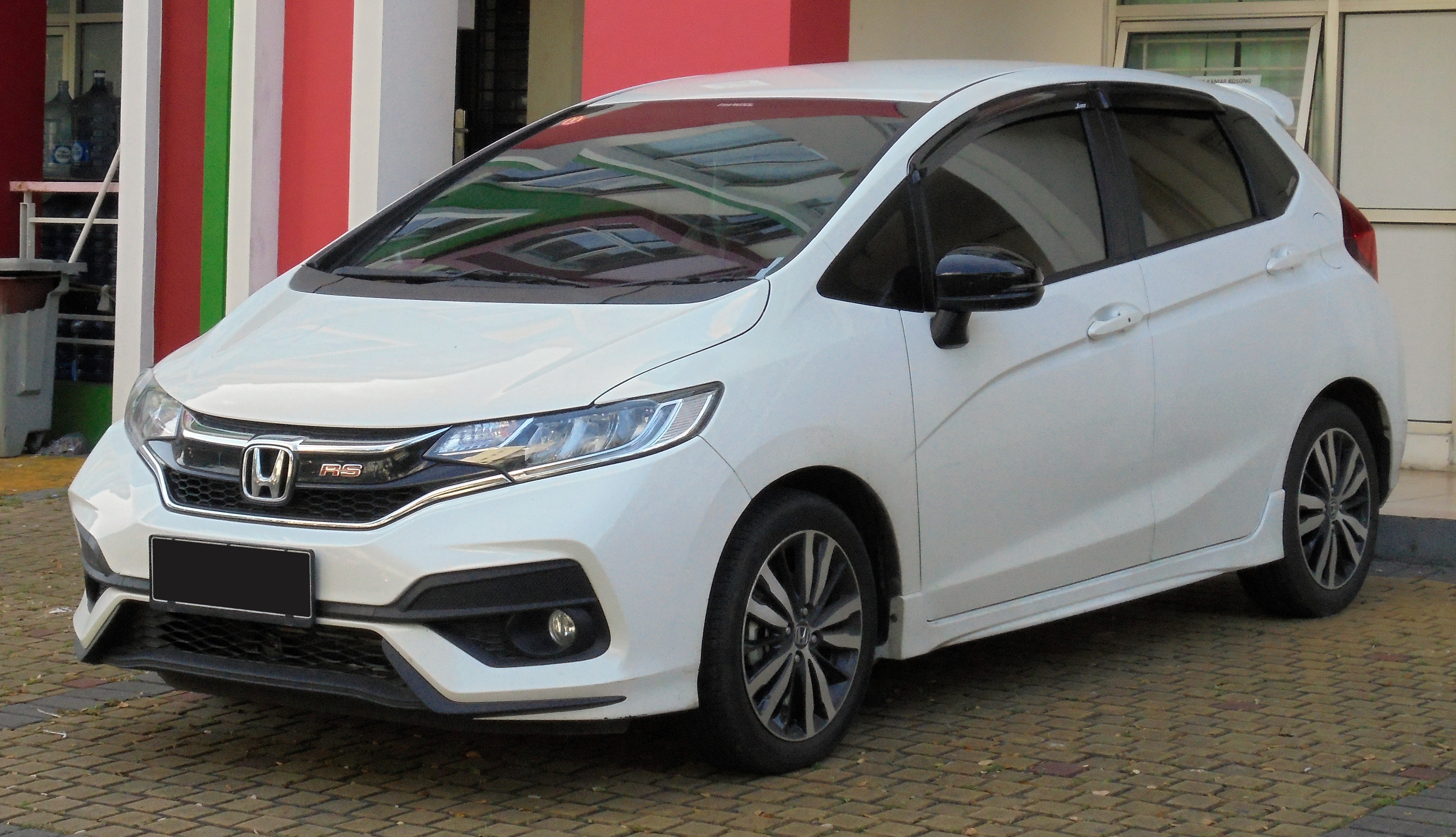
Jazz RS (Indonesia; facelift)

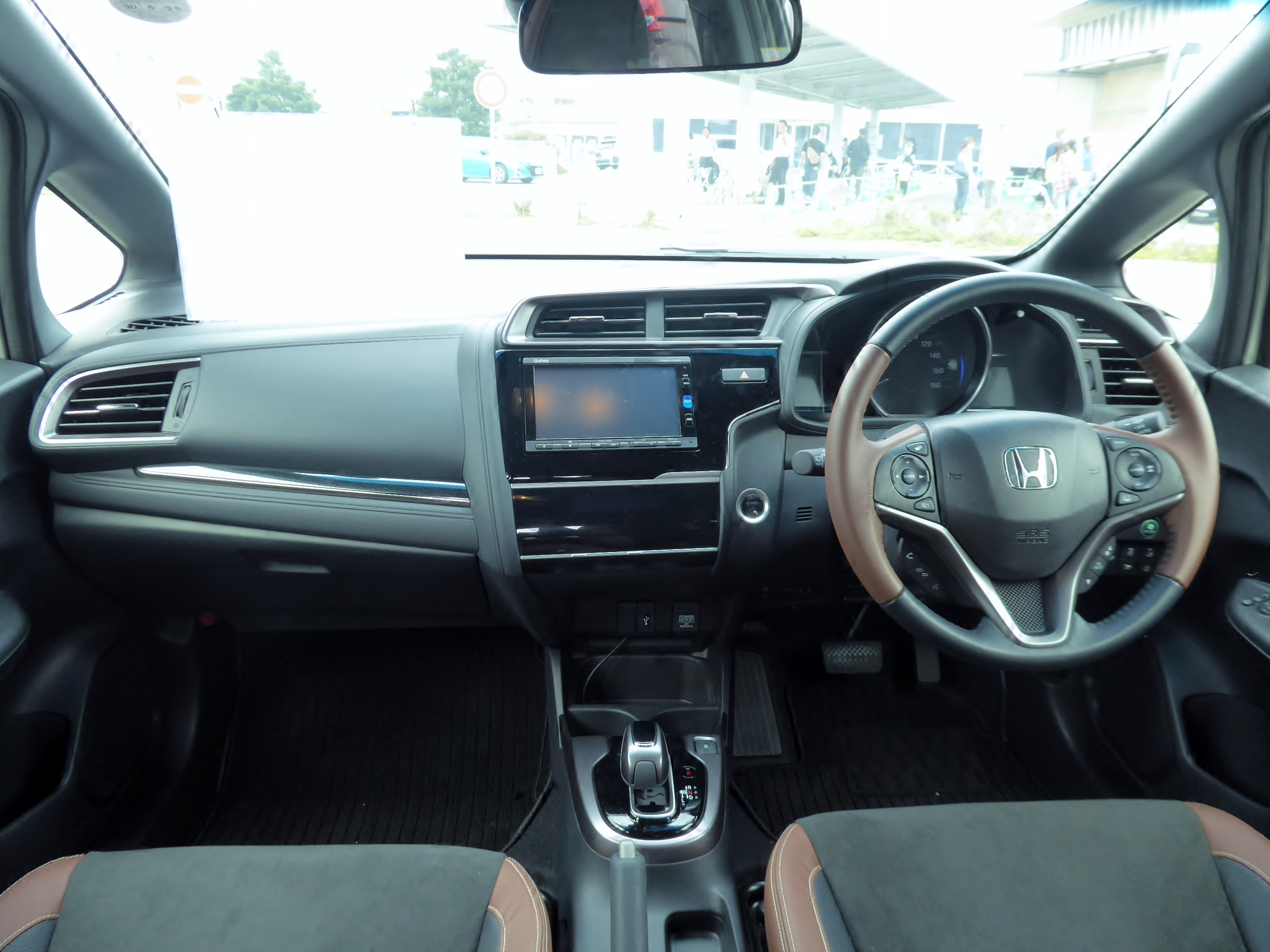
Fit Hybrid Interior (facelift)

=== Engines ===
Engine	Chassis code	Horsepower	Torque
1.2 L L12B I4 petrol	GK7 (FWD)	90 hp (67 kW) at 6,200 rpm	84 lb⋅ft (114 N⋅m) at 4,900 rpm
1.3 L L13B I4 petrol	GK3 (FWD); GK4 (AWD)	98 hp (73 kW) at 6,000 rpm	88 lb⋅ft (119 N⋅m) at 5,000 rpm
1.5 L L15B1 I4 petrol	GK5 (FWD); GK6 (AWD)	130 hp (97 kW) at 6,600 rpm	114 lb⋅ft (155 N⋅m) at 4,600 rpm
1.5 L L15Z2 / L15Z5 I4 petrol	GK5 (FWD)	118 hp (88 kW) at 6,600 rpm	107 lb⋅ft (145 N⋅m) at 4,800 rpm
1.5 L N15 I4 turbo-diesel	GH7 (FWD)	100 hp (75 kW) at 3,600 rpm	148 lb⋅ft (201 N⋅m) at 1,750 rpm
1.5 L LEB-H1 I4 hybrid petrol	GP5 (FWD); GP6 (AWD)	109 hp (81 kW) at 6,000 rpm (engine); 30 hp (22 kW) at 1,313-2,000 rpm (electric motor); 135 hp (101 kW) (combined)	99 lb⋅ft (134 N⋅m) at 5,000 rpm (engine); 118 lb⋅ft (160 N⋅m) at 0–1,313 rpm (electric motor); 125 lb⋅ft (169 N⋅m) (combined)

=== Safety ===
==== India ====
Global NCAP 1.0 test results (India) 2022 Honda Jazz, RHD (2 airbags) (H1 2022, similar to Latin NCAP 2013)
Test	Score	Stars
Adult occupant protection	13.89/17.00	4 /5 stars
Child occupant protection	31.54/49.00	3 /5 stars

==== Latin NCAP ====
Latin NCAP 1.5 test results 2015 Honda Fit, LHD (2 airbags) (2015, similar to Euro NCAP 2002)
Test	Points	Stars
Adult occupant:	16.26/17.0	5 /5 stars
Child occupant:	39.48/49.00	4 /5 stars

==== ASEAN NCAP ====
ASEAN NCAP test results Honda Jazz (2014)
Test	Points	Stars
Adult occupant:	15.58	4 /5 stars
Child occupant:	71%	4 /5 stars
Safety assist:	NA	

ASEAN NCAP test results Honda Jazz (2014)
Test	Points	Stars
Adult occupant:	15.58	5 /5 stars
Child occupant:	71%	4 /5 stars
Safety assist:	NA	

==== ANCAP ====
ANCAP test results Honda Jazz (2014)
Test	Score
Overall	5 /5 stars
Frontal offset	15.58/16
Side impact	16/16
Pole	2/2
Seat belt reminders	3/3
Whiplash protection	Good
Pedestrian protection	Adequate
Electronic stability control	Standard

==== Euro NCAP ====
Euro NCAP test results Honda Jazz 1.3 'Comfort' (LHD) (2015)
Test	Points	%
Overall:	5 /5 stars	
Adult occupant:	35.5	93%
Child occupant:	41.9	85%
Pedestrian:	26.3	73%
Safety assist:	9.3	71%

==== North America ====
IIHS scores
Category	Rating
Moderate overlap frontal offset	Good
Small overlap frontal offset	Acceptable^{1}
Side impact	Good
Roof strength	Good^{2}

^{1} Vehicle structure rated "Acceptable"
^{2} Strength-to-weight ratio: 6.13

+2015 Fit NHTSA scores
Overall:	5/5 stars
Frontal Driver:	5/5 stars
Frontal Passenger:	5/5 stars
Side Driver:	5/5 stars
Side Passenger:	5/5 stars
Side Pole Driver:	5/5 stars
Rollover:	/ 14.7%

== Fourth generation (GR/GS; 2020) ==
Fourth generation
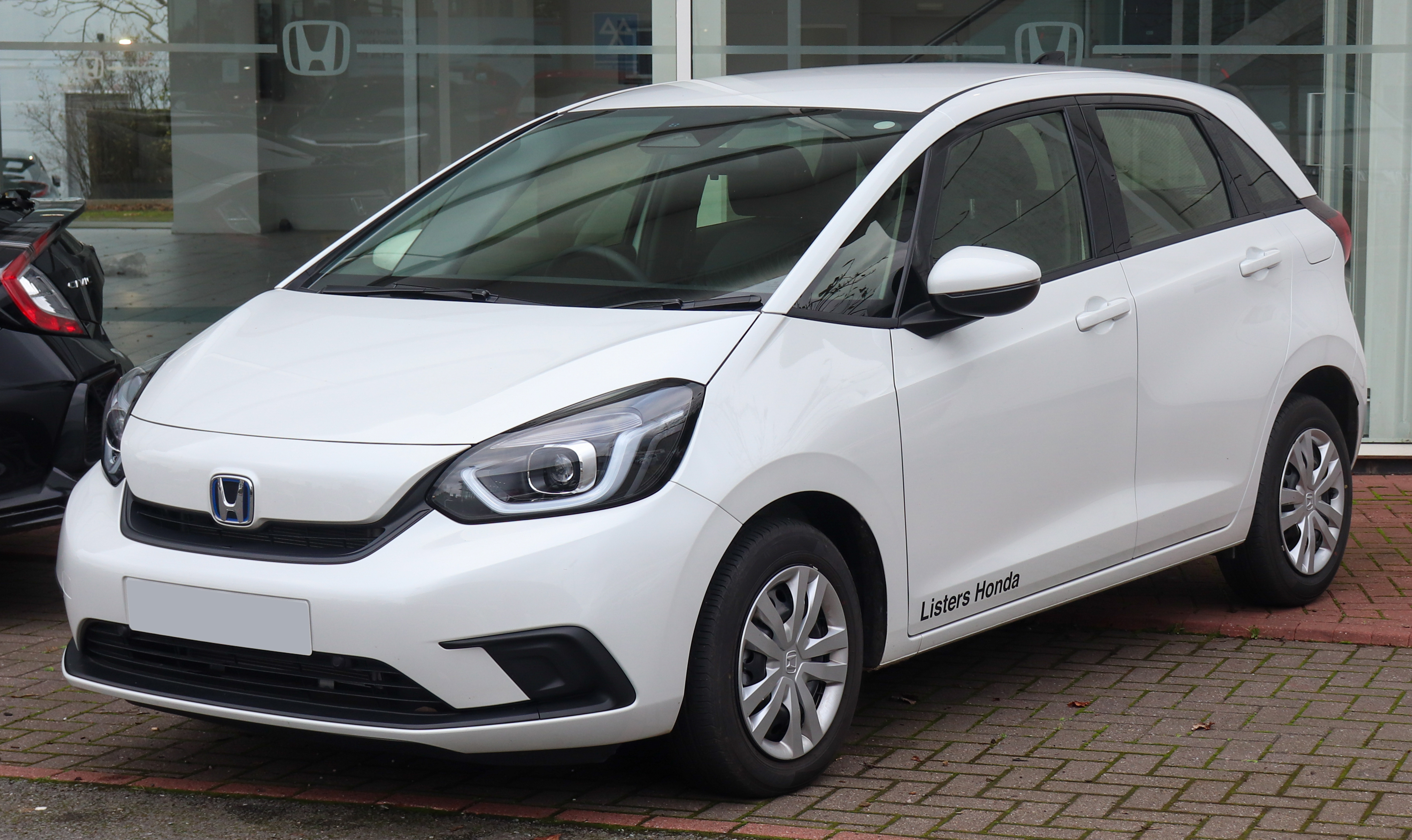
- Pre-facelift

Overview
- Model code: GR1; GR2; GR3; GR4; GR5; GR6; GR7; GR8; GS4; GS5; GS6; GS7
- Also called: Honda Jazz (Europe); Honda Life (China, Dongfeng Honda)
- Production: February 2020 – present
- Assembly: Japan: Suzuka, Mie; China: Guangzhou (GAC Honda, 2020–2026); Wuhan (Dongfeng Honda, Life, 2020–2025); Taiwan: Pingtung
- Designer: Baek Jongkuk

Body and chassis
- Platform: Honda Global Small Car
- Related: Honda City/Ballade (seventh generation); Honda HR-V/Vezel (third generation)

Powertrain
- Engine: Petrol: 1.3 L L13B DOHC i-VTEC Earth Dreams I4 (Japan); 1.5 L L15ZF Earth Dreams DOHC i-VTEC I4; 1.5 L L15BU Earth Dreams DOHC i-VTEC I4 (China); Petrol hybrid: 1.5 L LEB-H5 i-MMD Atkinson cycle I4 106hp engine + 123hp motor; 1.5 L LEB8 i-MMD Atkinson cycle I4 98hp engine + 109hp motor
- Electric motor: AC PMSM (e:HEV)
- Transmission: CVT e-CVT (e:HEV)
- Hybrid drivetrain: Sport Hybrid i-MMD (e:HEV)

Dimensions
- Wheelbase: 2,530 mm (99.6 in)
- Length: 3,995–4,110 mm (157.3–161.8 in)
- Width: 1,695–1,725 mm (66.7–67.9 in)
- Height: 1,515–1,565 mm (59.6–61.6 in)
- Curb weight: 1,070–1,280 kg (2,359–2,822 lb)

The fourth-generation Fit/Jazz was unveiled simultaneously on 23 October 2019 in Japan at the 46th Tokyo Motor Show and Amsterdam, Netherlands at the 'Electric Vision' event.

This generation model has been developed with electrification in mind, with the model being marketed as a hybrid-only model in Europe, and the hybrid variant being positioned as a volume car in Japan. The hybrid powertrain is marketed as the 'e:HEV', which utilizes Honda's new dual-motor i-MMD (Intelligent Multi-Mode Drive) hybrid system, replacing the previous Intelligent Dual Clutch Drive (i-DCD) setup.

The fourth-generation Fit retains the large windshield, which offers optimal forward visibility. It also has a redesigned front pillar with a cross-section that is different from the previous generation. Honda stated that it improves impact absorption into the body in the event of a collision. Combined with the use of a flat dashboard and a visor-less instrument display, it provides the driver with a better view of their surroundings. The windscreen wipers have also been hidden below the top of the hood line. While the car was unveiled on October 23, 2019, it didn't start production until February 13, 2020. It went on sales a day later.

The model was discontinued in the North American market due to declining sales of the previous generation. HR-V production was expanded to compensate for the discontinuation of the Fit in North America. The model is also not being sold in Australia where it had been known as the Jazz. The cost was deemed too high for import, and the small car market has shrunk due to the popularity of small SUVs. In most countries in South America and Southeast Asia, the Fit/Jazz is replaced by the City Hatchback.

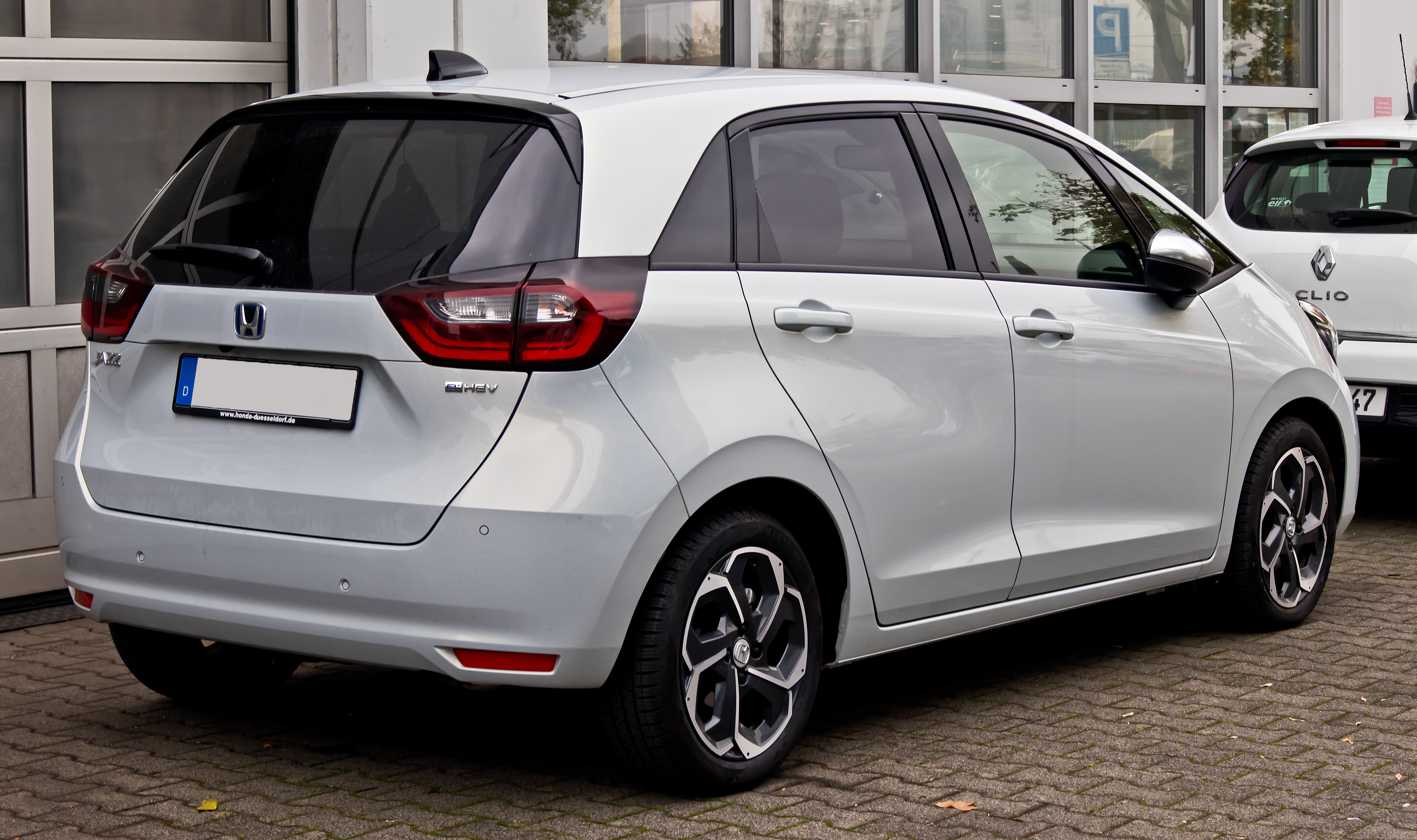
Jazz Executive (Europe; pre-facelift)

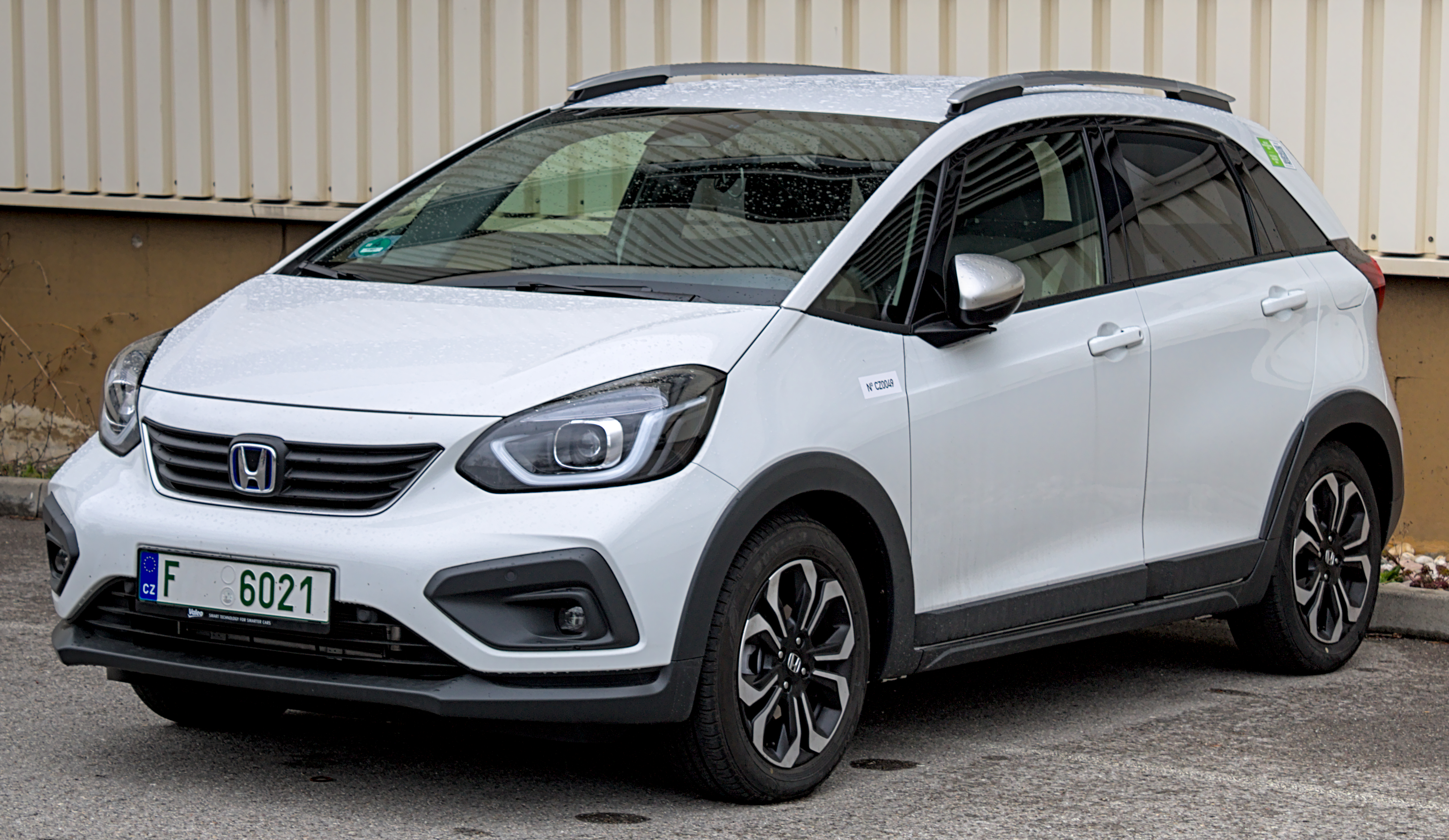
Jazz Crosstar (Europe; pre-facelift)

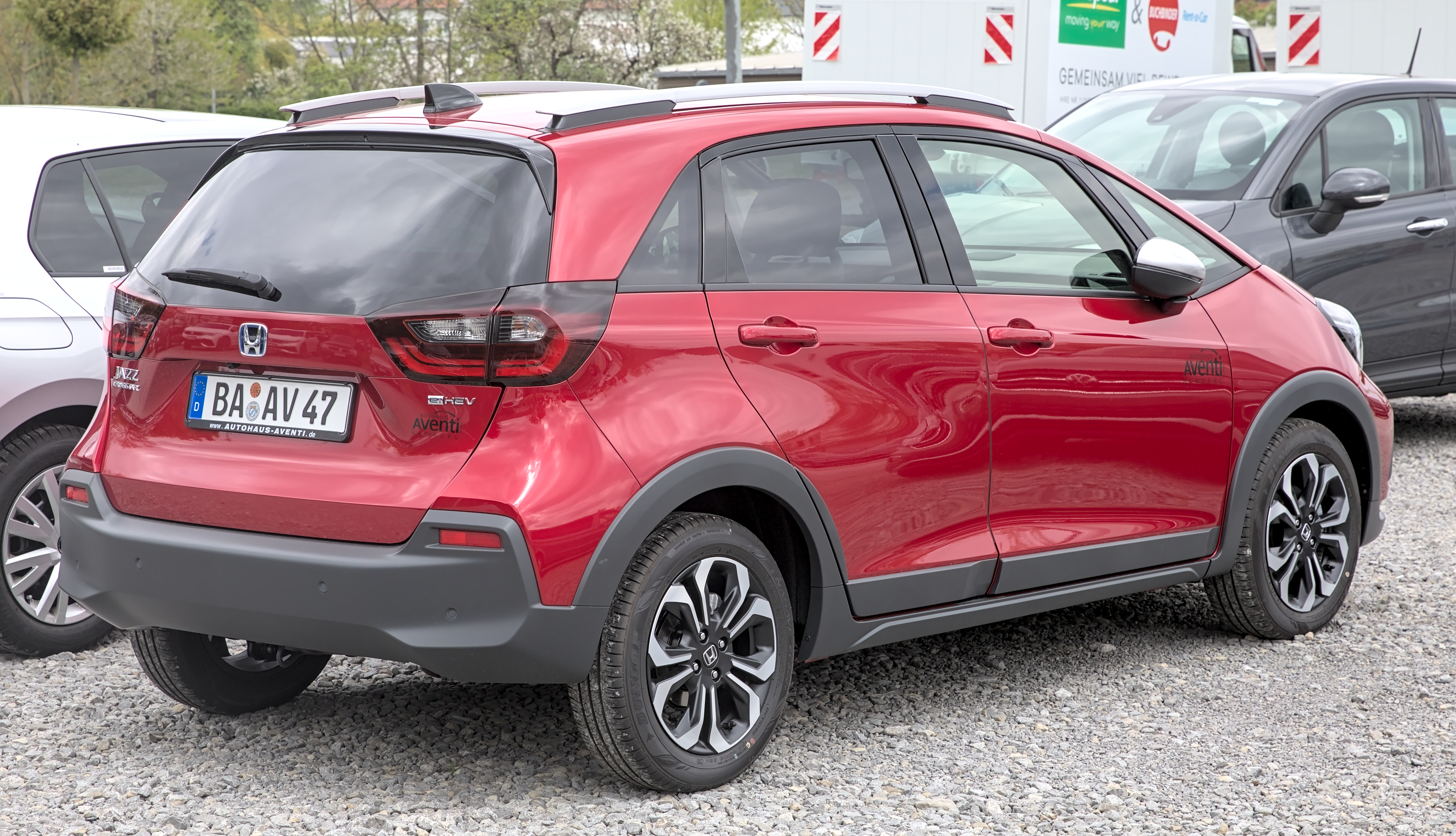
Jazz Crosstar (Europe; pre-facelift)

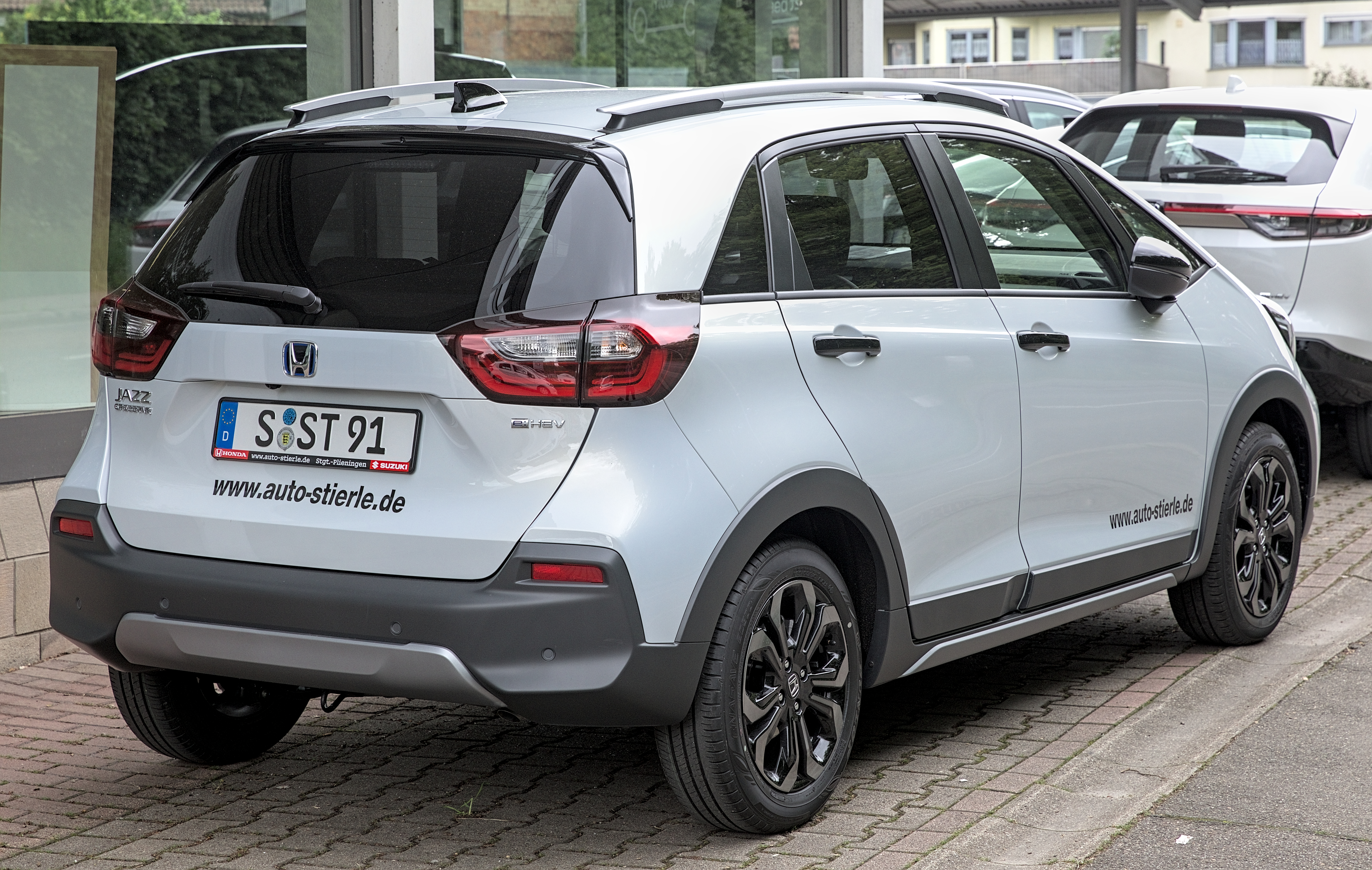
Jazz Crosstar (Europe; facelift)

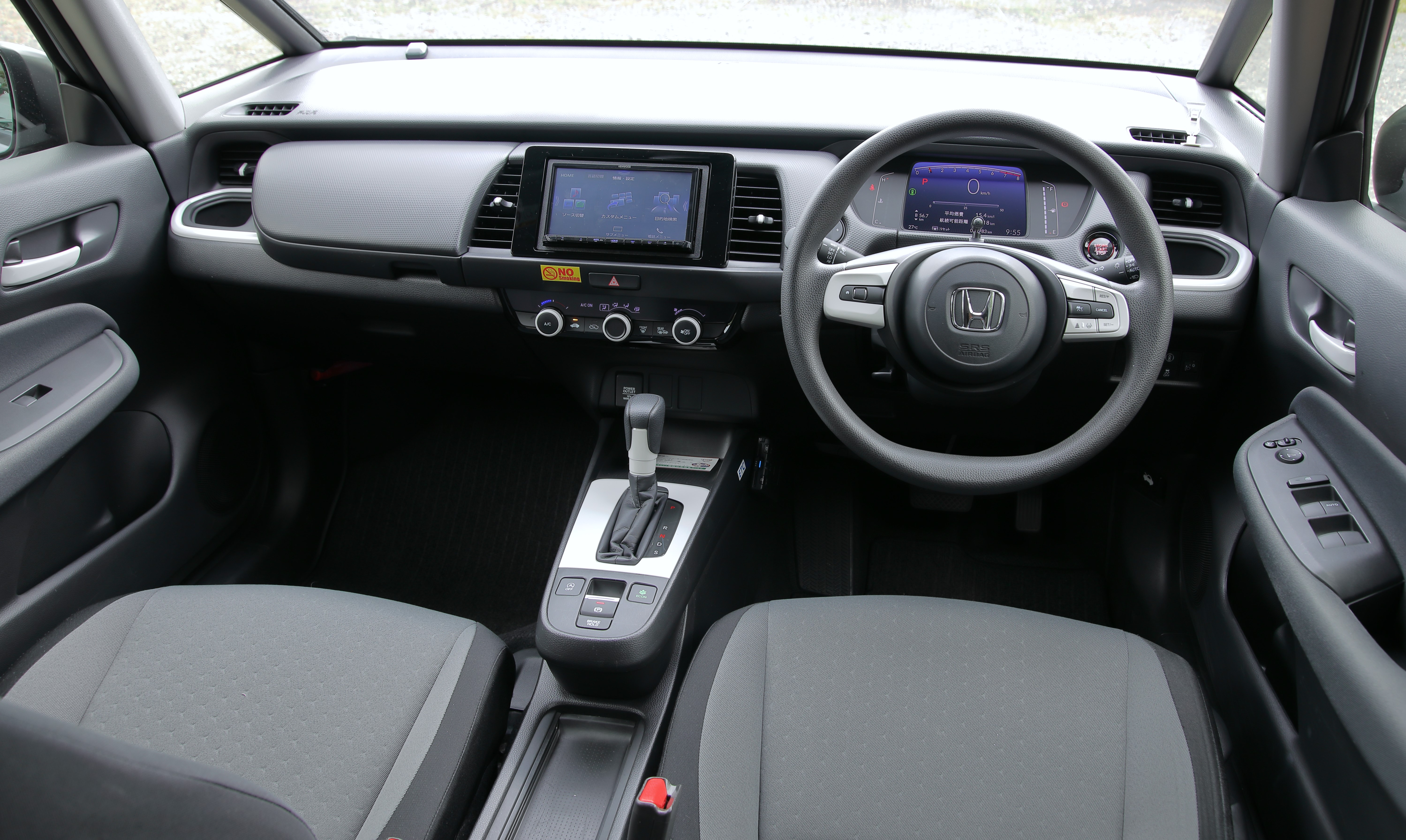
Interior (Fit Basic)

=== Markets ===
==== China ====
The Chinese-market Fit is produced and sold by GAC Honda, and launched on 10 June 2020. It is available with two sub-models which are Sport and Crosstar. The Fit Sport featured sportier-looking front and rear bumpers compared to the Japanese or European model. Its twin model for the Chinese market is produced and sold by Dongfeng Honda under the name Honda Life. Both are fitted with a more pronounced rear bumpers compared to the Japanese-produced model, increasing its length to 4,110 mm (161.8 in).

The minor differences between the two are the front bumper designs and rear taillight tint colour (the Life has a clear smoked tint).

Both the Chinese-market Fit and Life is powered by a 1.5-litre i-VTEC engine to a CVT transmission. There is no hybrid option offered in China.

The facelift Fit launched on 16 January 2026. Sales limited to 3,000 units.

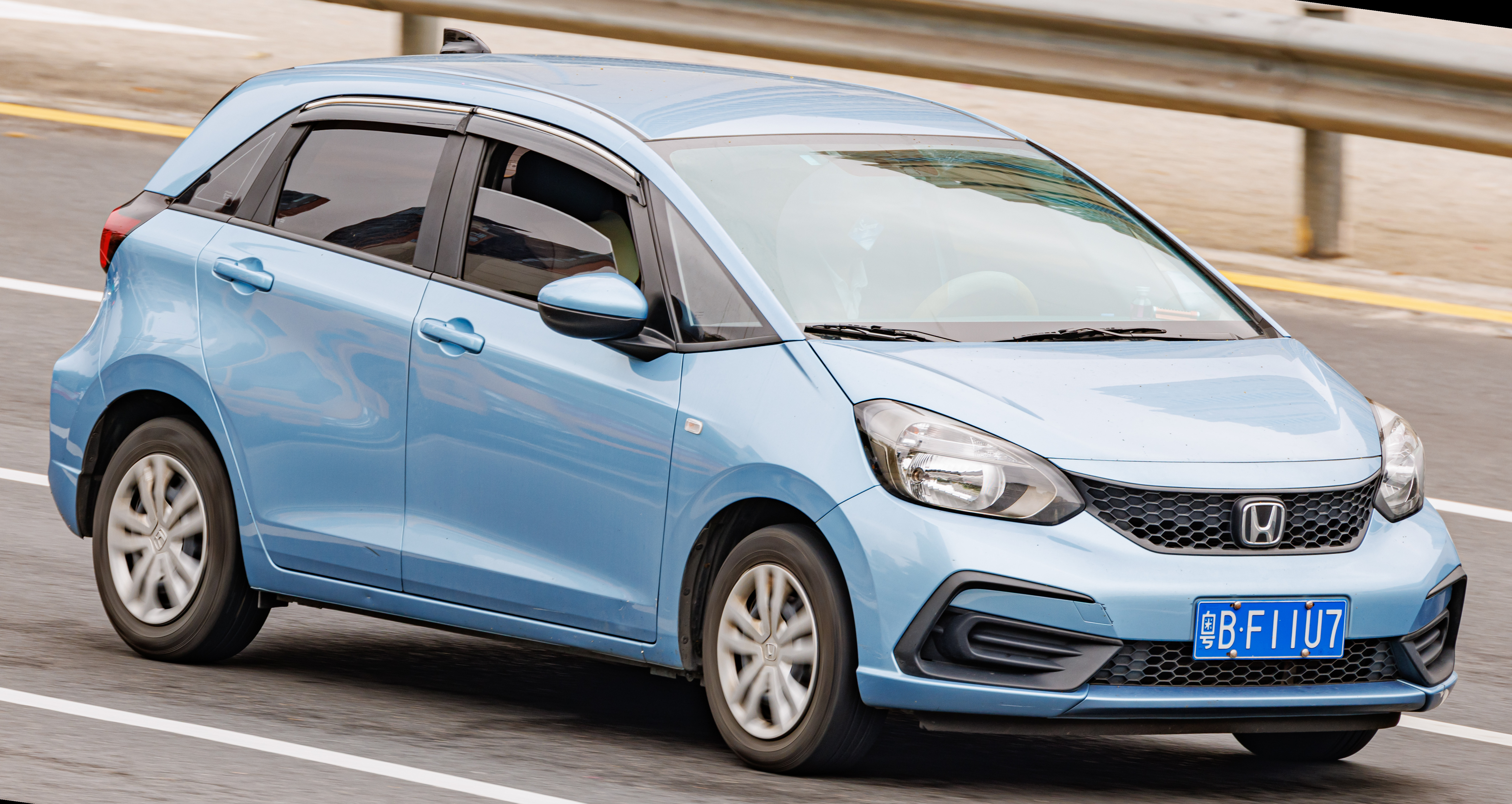
Guangqi Honda Fit (China, pre-facelift)

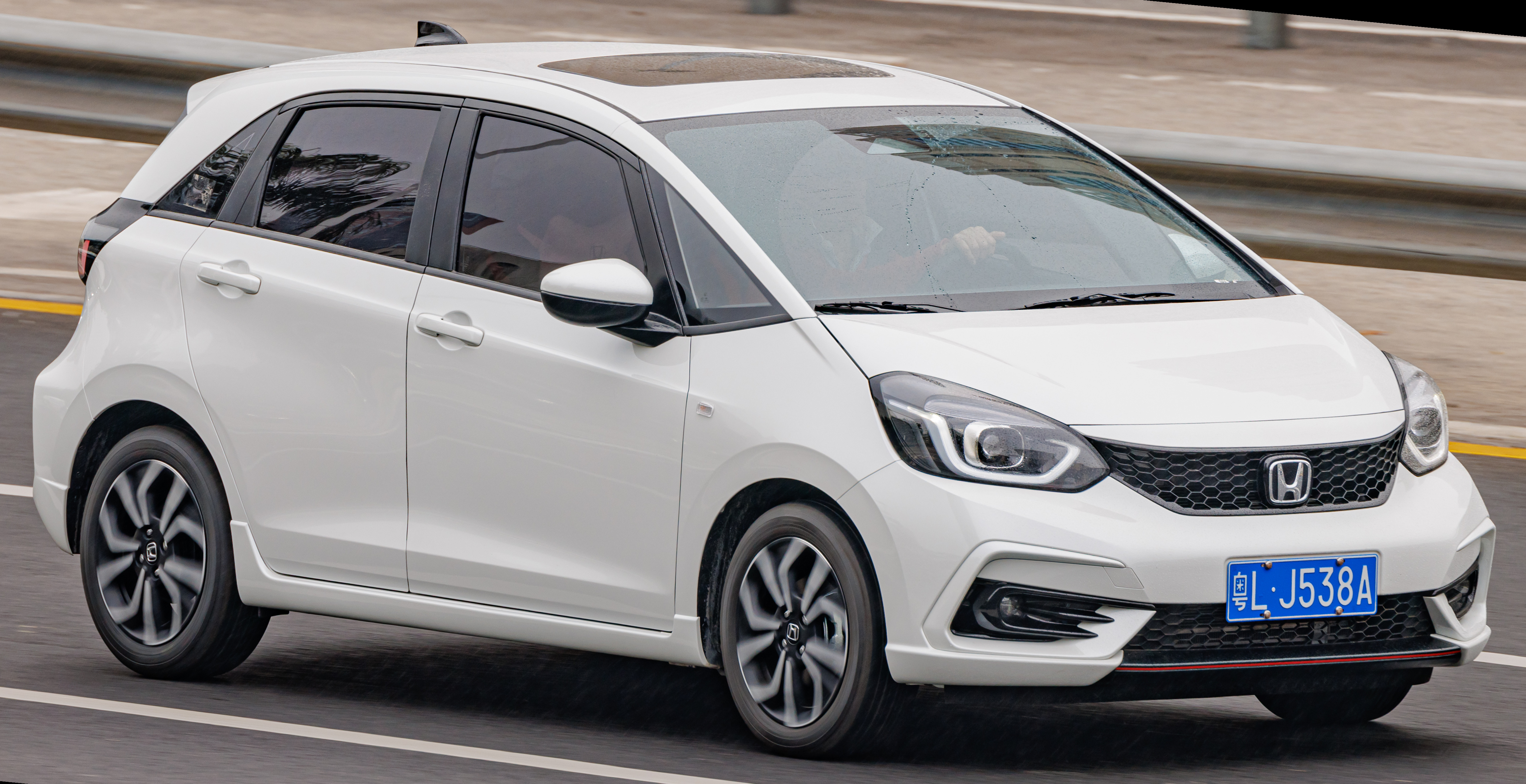
Dongfeng Honda Life Sport (China)

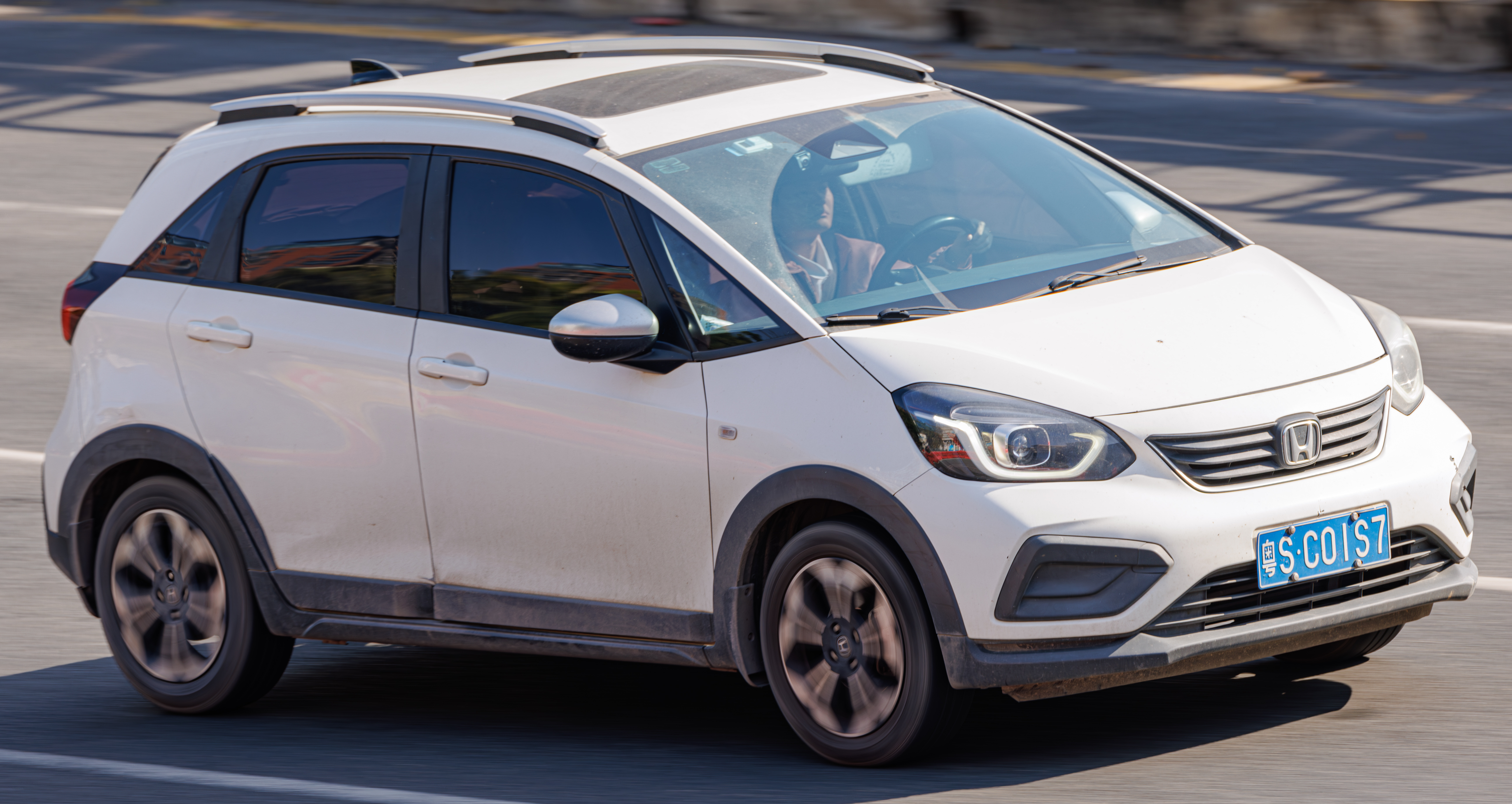
Guangqi Honda Fit Crosstar (China)

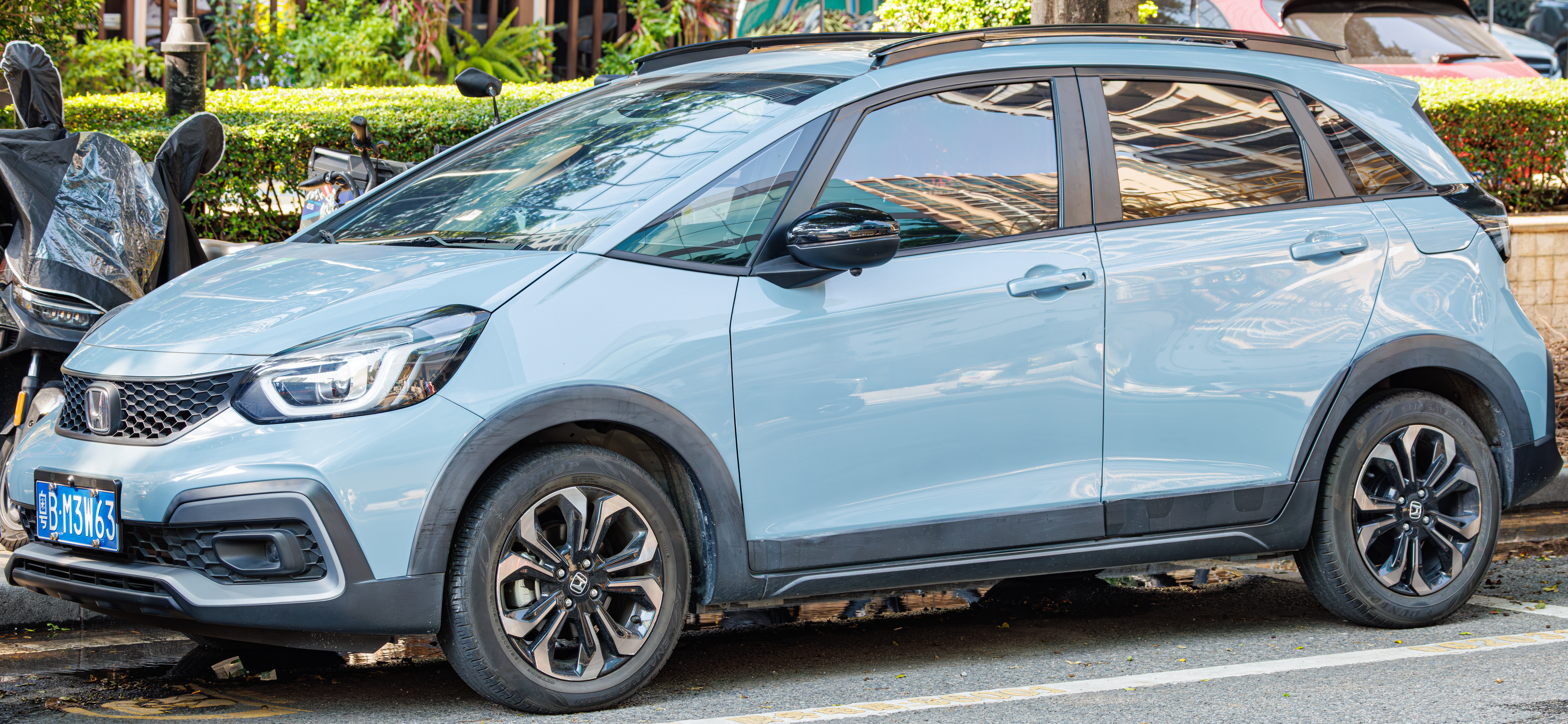
Dongfeng Honda Life Crosstar (China)

==== Europe ====
The Jazz went on sale in Europe in June 2020 as a hybrid only model, as Honda had begun phasing out conventional combustion engines in the region. The Crosstar model is also offered as a range-topping model. For the market, Honda stated the Jazz is capable of achieving 62.8 mpg_{‑imp} (22.2 km/L; 4.5 L/100 km; 52.3 mpg_{‑US}) on the WLTP combined cycle while emitting 102 g/km (5.8 oz/mi) of CO_{2} in its standard form.

==== Hong Kong ====
The Jazz was launched in Hong Kong on 8 March 2021, with three variants at launch.

In October 2022, the facelifted model debuted, with the addition of a new RS e:HEV variant.

==== Japan ====
The Fit was launched in Japan on 13 February 2020 and went on sale on the following day. Initial trim levels for the Japanese market Fit were: Basic, Home, Ness, Crosstar and Luxe.

In Japan, the Fit is offered with both conventional 1.3-litre petrol engine and the 1.5-litre e:HEV system. The take rate of the Fit e:HEV in Japan is targeted to reach 65 percent, up from the previous generation's 40 percent. In reality, the Fit e:HEV accounted for 72 percent of sales as per March 2020.

The Japanese market Fit received a facelift in August 2022, which reintroduced the RS trim (replacing Ness model). The facelifted model went on sale on 7 October 2022.

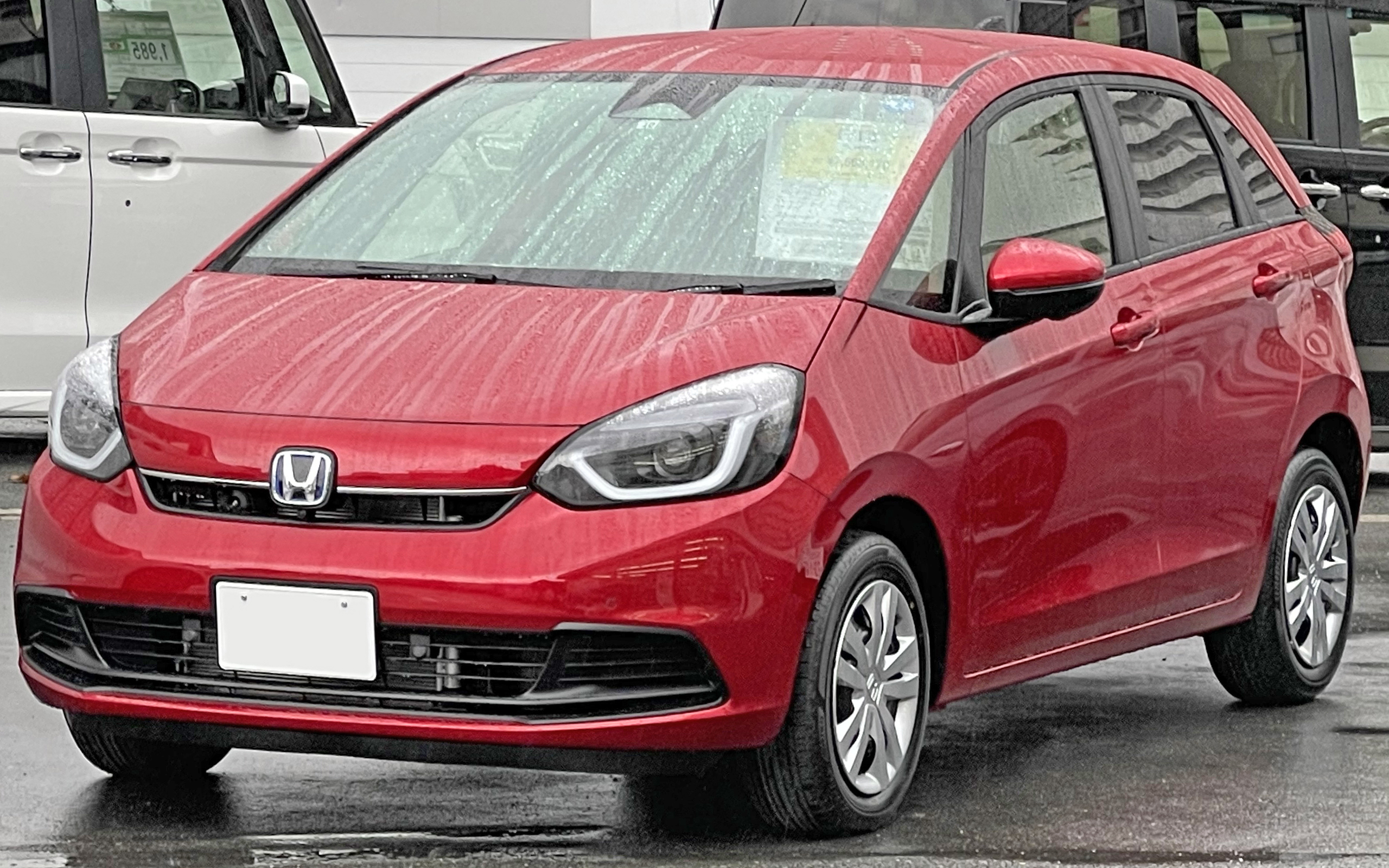
Fit e:HEV Home (Japan; 2022 facelift)

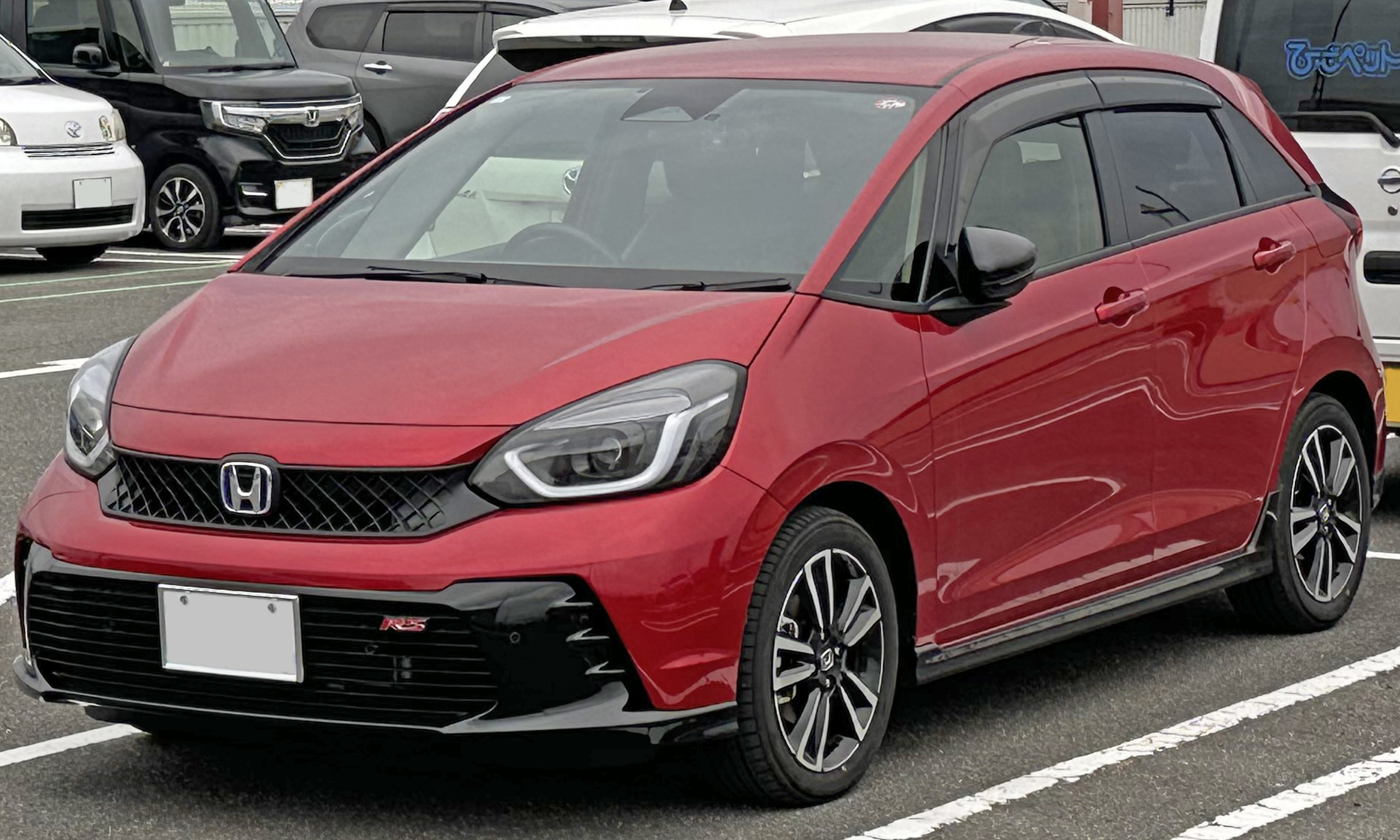
Fit e:HEV RS (Japan; 2022 facelift)

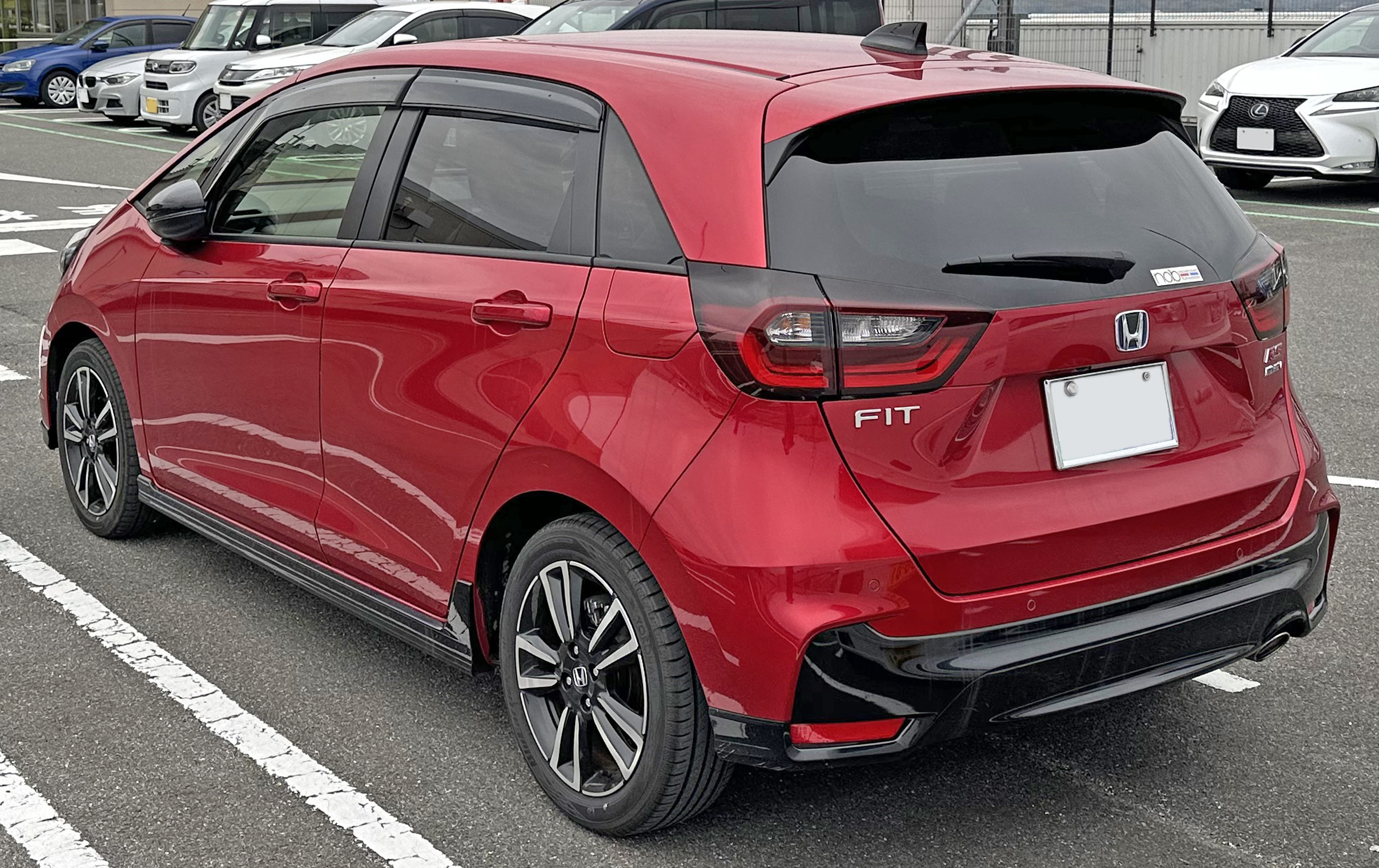
Fit e:HEV RS (Japan; 2022 facelift)

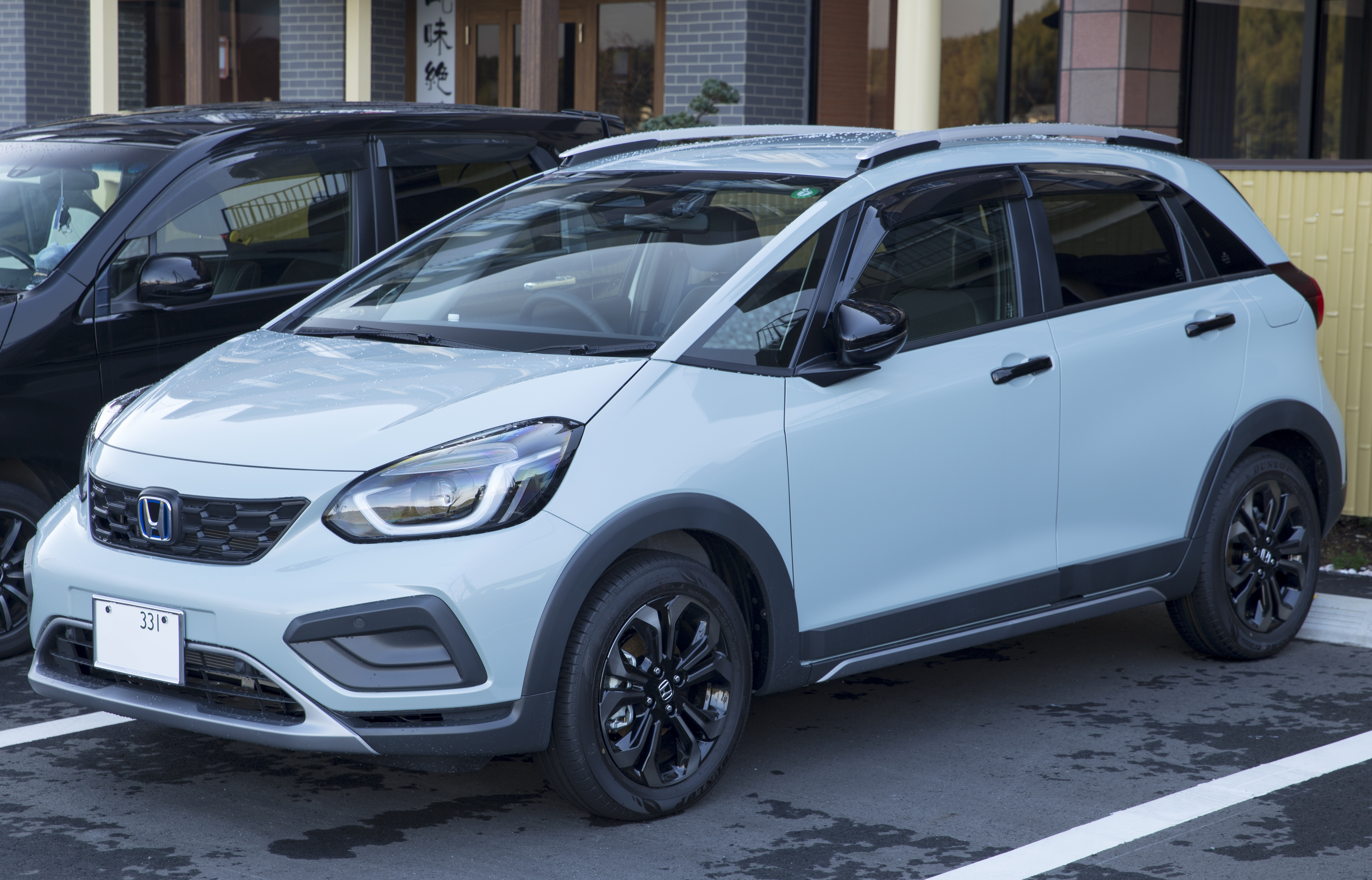
Fit e:HEV Crosstar (Japan; 2022 facelift)

==== New Zealand ====
The Jazz was launched in New Zealand on 5 May 2021, with three variants at launch: Life, Crosstar and e:HEV Luxe.

In February 2023, the facelifted Jazz debuted with a few changes to line-up: the Life grade dropped, the Luxe was renamed to Luxe Sport, and a new RS variant.

==== Singapore ====
The Jazz was launched in Singapore on 29 January 2021, with three variants at launch: Base, Home and Luxe e:HEV.

In February 2023, the facelifted model debuted in Singapore, along with the introduction of the Crosstar variant.

==== South Africa ====
The Fit was launched on 25 June 2021 in South Africa, with 4 variants at launch: Comfort, Elegance, Executive and Hybrid (followed at a later date).

In December 2023, the facelifted model debuted, with the Executive grade discontinued.

==== Taiwan ====
The fourth generation Fit for Taiwan was announced on 10 September 2021, with sales commenced in December, with two variants at launch: Home and e:HEV.

=== Powertrain ===
The fourth-generation Fit is offered with a new hybrid powertrain option marketed as the e:HEV, the system uses Honda's dual-motor i-MMD (Intelligent Multi-Mode Drive) hybrid system. The system combines a 1.5-litre DOHC i-VTEC four-cylinder petrol engine that on its own makes 98 PS (97 hp; 72 kW) from 5,600 to 6,400 rpm and 127 N⋅m (13.0 kg⋅m; 93.7 lb⋅ft) from 4,500 to 5,000 rpm with two electric motors, with one of them acting as a generator to recharge the lithium-ion battery while the other is an electric propulsion motor capable of spinning at 13,300 rpm to handle low-speed acceleration. The engine sends power to the front wheels through a single fixed-gear ratio and a lock-up clutch, which is claimed to provide a smoother transfer of torque during acceleration. The setup is claimed to be more compact and refined compared to a planetary eCVT typically found in other hybrid vehicles. The system is rated at 109 PS (108 hp; 80 kW) and 253 N⋅m (25.8 kg⋅m; 187 lb⋅ft) of torque.

The conventional petrol engine for the Japanese market is 1.3-litre naturally-aspirated i-VTEC four-cylinder, making 98 PS at 6,000 rpm and 118 Nm of torque at 5,000 rpm. It is mated to a CVT and a choice of either front or all-wheel drive.

Engine	Chassis code	Horsepower	Torque
1.3 L L13B I4 petrol	GR1 (Standard FWD); GR2 (Standard AWD); GR5 (Crosstar FWD); GR7 (Crosstar AWD)	98 hp (73 kW) at 6,000 rpm	88 lb⋅ft (119 N⋅m) at 5,000 rpm
1.5 L L15BU I4 petrol	GS4 (Standard FWD); GS5 (Crosstar FWD)	130 hp (97 kW) at 6,600 rpm	114 lb⋅ft (155 N⋅m) at 4,600 rpm
1.5 L L15ZF I4 petrol	GS4 (Standard FWD); GS6 (Standard AWD); GS5 (Crosstar FWD); GS7 (Crosstar AWD)	119 hp (89 kW) at 6,600 rpm	107 lb⋅ft (145 N⋅m) at 4,300 rpm
1.5 L LEB-H5 I4 hybrid petrol	GR3 (Standard FWD); GR4 (Standard AWD); GR6 (Crosstar FWD); GR8 (Crosstar AWD)	97 hp (72 kW) at 5,600-6,400 rpm (engine); 107 hp (80 kW) at 3,500-8,000 rpm (electric motor)	94 lb⋅ft (127 N⋅m) at 4,500-5,000 rpm (engine); 187 lb⋅ft (254 N⋅m) at 0–3,000 rpm (electric motor)

=== Safety ===
Euro NCAP test results Honda Jazz 1.5 Hybrid 'Elegance' (LHD) (2020)
Test	Points	%
Overall:	5 /5 stars	
Adult occupant:	33.1	87%
Child occupant:	41.1	83%
Pedestrian:	43.4	80%
Safety assist:	12.3	76%

TNCAP (1.0) test result Honda Fit 1.5 'Home' (petrol) (2024, similar to Euro NCAP 2017)
Test	Points	%
Overall:	4/5 stars	
Adult occupant:	31.064	81%
Child occupant:	35.523	72%
Pedestrian:	34.299	81%
Safety assist:	8.066	67%

== Sales ==
Japanese sales of the first-generation Fit greatly exceeded the original monthly sales target of 8,000 units on debut. By December 2001, it had outsold the Toyota Corolla, and ranked first in sales for nine out of twelve months in 2002. With a total sales of 250,790 for the year of 2002, it became the best-selling vehicle in Japan, which is a first for a Honda model. By September 2003, a little more than two years after the car was first sold, Fit reached 500,000 sales in Japanese market.

After a minor model change that went on sale on 11 June 2004, Honda announced that, in about two weeks' period after its introduction, the company received orders from customers totaled around 13,000 units. By November 2007, in less than six months after minor model change, cumulative sales of Fit reached one million units in Japan.

The second generation has been the top selling car in Japan since its official launch in November 2007. By September 2010, cumulative sales in Japan reached 1.5 million units.

Year	Hatchback	Aria/Grace (sedan)	Ranking in Japan
2001	104,298		6
2002	250,790	1,231	1
2003	182,285	14,623	2
2004	149,503	6,992	2
2005	125,894	5,450	3
2006	101,793	5,238	3
2007	116,561		3
2008	174,910		1
2009	157,324		2
2010	185,439		2
2011	207,882		2
2012	209,276		3
2013	181,414		3
2014	202,838		2
2015	119,846		3
2016	105,622		4
2017	97,939		6
2018	90,720		7
2019	74,410		12
2020	98,210		4
2021	58,780		12
2022	60,271		9
2023	57,033		15
2024	61,808		16
2025	46,881		19

By December 2004, cumulative global sales of Fit/Jazz reached 1 million units. On 17 July 2007, Honda announced that as of the end of June more than 2 million Fit/Jazz units had been sold worldwide since its introduction. Japan accounts for the largest percentage of sales, with 962,000 units sold in the home market. Europe is next with 417,000 units. The United States accounts for 77,000 cars since introduction in 2006. Honda expected to sell 33,000 vehicles in the U.S. for the 2007 model year, but exceeded these expectations, and sold 40,000. Honda plans to put 70,000 Fit units on American roads for the 2008 model year.

In the first half of 2008, Honda and other manufacturers were surprised by the rapid shift towards smaller cars in the United States. Sales of the Fit during the first five months of the year jumped 64% compared with that of 2007. Production of 2009 Fit for the U.S. market was to increase from 60,000 to 80,000 cars. Further increase in supply for the U.S. market is limited by Honda's production capacity of 500,000 a year for all markets.

Honda announced that by the end of July 2009, worldwide sales of Fit/Jazz reached 3 million. One year later, global cumulative sales reached 3.5 million units in July 2010.

Year	U.S.	Canada	Brazil	Europe	China		India	Indonesia	Thailand	Australia
Year	U.S.	Canada	Brazil	Europe	Fit	Life	India	Indonesia	Thailand	Australia
2001				34						
2002				43,024						1,406
2003			15,081	52,004	16,554					8,501
2004			29,511	82,783	77,639			24,844		7,360
2005			34,840	87,365	89,224			32,241		7,914
2006	27,934	10,634	35,127	79,627	59,233			18,442		9,441
2007	56,432	13,507	34,408	67,711	63,319			14,057		11,633
2008	79,794	14,836	40,512	59,216	49,883			24,969		9,563
2009	67,315	9,553	48,662	75,456	48,640		6,247	15,713		9,031
2010	54,354	7,900	40,936	59,291	33,575		5,025	22,758		9,130
2011	59,235	2,835	28,765	57,440	21,043		1,131	19,440		7,407
2012	49,346	4,736	38,623	49,134	35,920			21,244		9,063
2013	53,513	9,512	40,645	42,548	40,747			27,803		5,726
2014	59,340	11,732	53,684	37,645	84,699			22,329	16,533	
2015	52,724	9,088	42,476	30,510	95,963		29,644	17,345	21,652	9,845
2016	56,630	8,622	28,439	37,005	113,597		34,902	18,110	20,922	8,316
2017	49,454	5,019	25,347	34,898	111,752		29,890	16,100	23,363	
2018	35,300	3,520	27,359	37,894	129,179		18,370	14,270	27,086	
2019	35,414	3,437	24,457	30,730	110,380		9,512	12,168		5,263
2020	32,488	2,361	12,834	25,182	62,612	6,113	3,254	5,422	15,568	
2021	8,695	361	7,140	30,503	96,326	24,896	7,259		10,186	
2022			231	21,844	60,473	14,445				
2023					53,305	6,759				
2024					15,677	2,773				
2025					2,751	839				

=== Marketing ===
Honda planned to use the name Fitta, and it was planned to be released in Japan under that name in 2001. Because Fitta in Scandinavian languages is vulgar slang for vagina, Honda instead used Jazz in most markets and Fit in the Americas.

In April 2006, Honda Australia promoted Honda Jazz with Village Green, an animated television commercial, in 30 second and 60 second versions, inspired by Thomas the Tank Engine. In the same month, American Honda launched the Fit with six five-second and two 30-second TV ads, with the slogan 'The Fit Is Go'.

Subsequent ad campaigns included "Mecha-Mosquitoes," (broke 9/21) "Defense Mechanism" (breaks 10/2) and "Bats" (breaks 9/28), produced by Digital Domain. As part of the campaign, the vehicle also appeared in Gossip Girl, 90210, America's Next Top Model, Smallville and Everybody Hates Chris. Print ads "Gas Hogs" and "Cavernous" were featured in popular magazines. A dedicated marketing site was built to communicate top product features through games and interactive experiences. The campaign continued the slogan 'The Fit Is Go'.

== Awards and recognition ==
- Japan Car of the Year for years 2001–02 and 2007–08
- Japan Car of the Year 30th Anniversary Special Award "Best 3rd Decade Car": 1st generation Fit/Jazz
- RJC Car of the Year Award 2002
- Car and Driver's Best Small Car in its 2007–13 10 Best lists.
- Top Gear Survey 2006: Best Small Car
- Top Gear Survey 2006: Second best of all cars in the survey (after the Honda S2000)
- IGN Best of 2006 Awards: Killer B-segment Award
- Greenercars.org's One of the Greenest Vehicles of 2007 and 2008
- MotorWeek Drivers' Choice Awards 2007—Best Small Car
- MotorWeek Drivers' Choice Awards 2007—Best of the Year
- MotorWeek Drivers' Choice Awards 2009—Best Small Car
- Best Economy Car for 2008, U.S. News & World Report
- Top 10 Urban Vehicles for 2008 - Cars.com
- 2009 Car of the Year Finalist, Motor Trend
- 2010 Best Overall Value by Consumer Reports
- 2010 Best Hatchback for the Money, U.S. News & World Report
- 2011 Best Overall Value by Consumer Reports
- 2012 Best Overall Value by Consumer Reports
- 2012 Best Cars for Families Awards - No. 1 in Affordable Small Cars

== Racing ==
Honda Fit was one of the cars listed as eligible for the SCCA World Challenge's touring car B-spec class for the 2012 season onward.

Fit engines are also used in another SCCA class, the F1600 Championship Series.

Honda Fit races on Super Taikyu Series.

== See also ==
- Honda City - the original 'Tall Boy' Honda Jazz sold in 1980s Europe
- Honda EV Plus
- Honda L-series engine
