= Takanobu Ito =

Japanese business executive (born 1953)

- 伊東孝紳
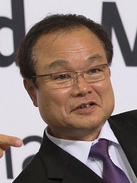
- Ito in 2014
- Born: 29 August 1953 (age 72); Tokyo, Japan
- Occupation: Business executive
- Employer: Honda
- Board member of: Honda

Takanobu Ito (伊東 孝紳, Itō Takanobu; born 29 August 1953) is a Japanese business executive who led Honda from 2009 to 2015.

== Career ==
Takanobu joined Honda in April 1978 and had also been an executive of Honda R&D since 1998 and was appointed as President and Director of Honda in April 2009. In February 2015, following a recall due to faulty airbags, he announced his resignation as Honda CEO in late June, and was succeeded by Takahiro Hachigo.

Previously, Takanobu had been appointed Senior Managing Director of Honda R&D in June 2001, after Director of the Company in June 2000, following the position as Executive Vice President of Honda R&D Americas, Inc. since April 1998.
