= Honda =

Japanese automotive manufacturer

Honda Motor Co., Ltd.
- Logo used since 2000

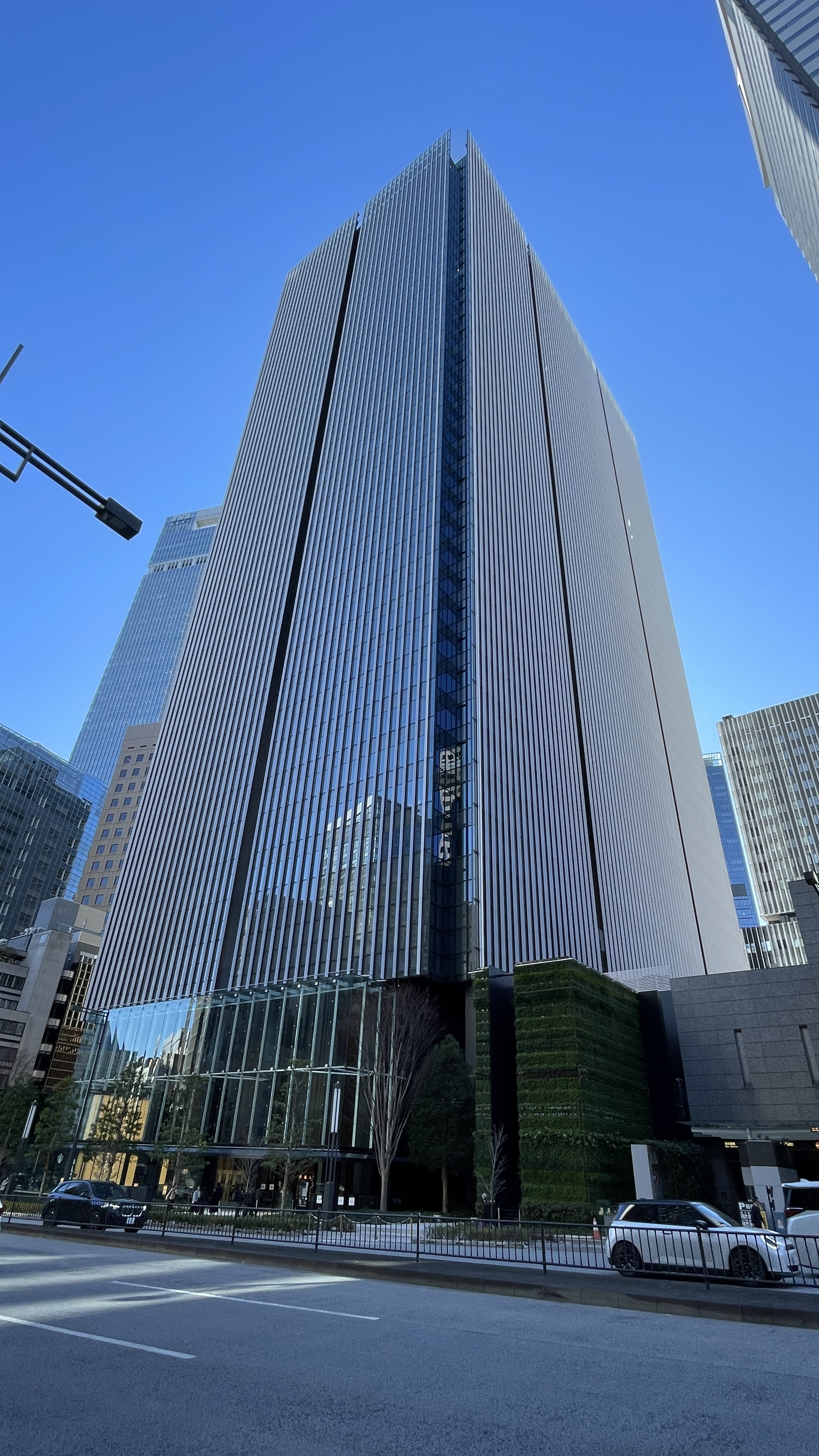
- Headquarters at Toranomon Alcea Tower, Toranomon, Minato, Tokyo
- Native name: 本田技研工業株式会社
- Romanized name: Honda Giken Kōgyō Kabushiki-gaisha
- Type: Public
- Traded as: TYO: 7267; NYSE: HMC; Nikkei 225 component (7267); TOPIX Core30 component (7267)
- Industry: Automotive; Manufacturing
- Founded: October 1946; 80 years ago (brand); 24 September 1948; 78 years ago (incorporation)
- Founder: Soichiro Honda
- Headquarters: Toranomon, Minato, Tokyo, Japan
- Area served: Worldwide
- Key people: Toshihiro Mibe (chairman, president & CEO); Toshinobu Minami (Chief Design Officer)
- Products: Cars; Commercial vehicles; Luxury cars; Motorcycles; Scooters; Electric generators; Water pumps; Lawn and garden equipment; Rotary tillers; Outboard motors; Robotics; Jet aircraft; Rockets; Jet engines; Thin-film solar cells; Internavi (telematics)
- Production output: ▼3,521,905 vehicles (2025)
- Revenue: ▲¥21.69 trillion (US$137 billion) (2025)
- Operating income: ▼¥1.21 trillion (US$7.66 billion) (2025)
- Net income: ▼¥835.84 billion (US$5.28 billion) (2025)
- Total assets: ▲¥30.78 trillion (US$194.4 billion) (2025)
- Total equity: ▲¥12.63 trillion (US$79.76 billion) (2025)
- Number of employees: 194,173 (2025)
- Divisions: Honda Automobiles (Acura); Honda Motorcycles
- Subsidiaries: List: Transportation; American Honda Motor Company; Honda Aircraft Company; Honda Marine; Honda Racing Corporation USA; Astemo (61%); Astra Honda Motor (50%); Dongfeng Honda (50%); GAC Honda (50%); Honda Atlas (51%); Honda Australia; Honda Canada; Honda Cars India; Honda Motorcycle & Scooter India; Honda Mexico; Honda Prospect Motor (51%); Honda Taiwan; Honda Vietnam (42%); Montesa Honda (88%); Sony Honda Mobility (50%) Engines; Honda Aero; GE Honda Aero Engines (50%) Motorsport; Honda Racing Corporation; Honda Mobilityland
- Website: global.honda

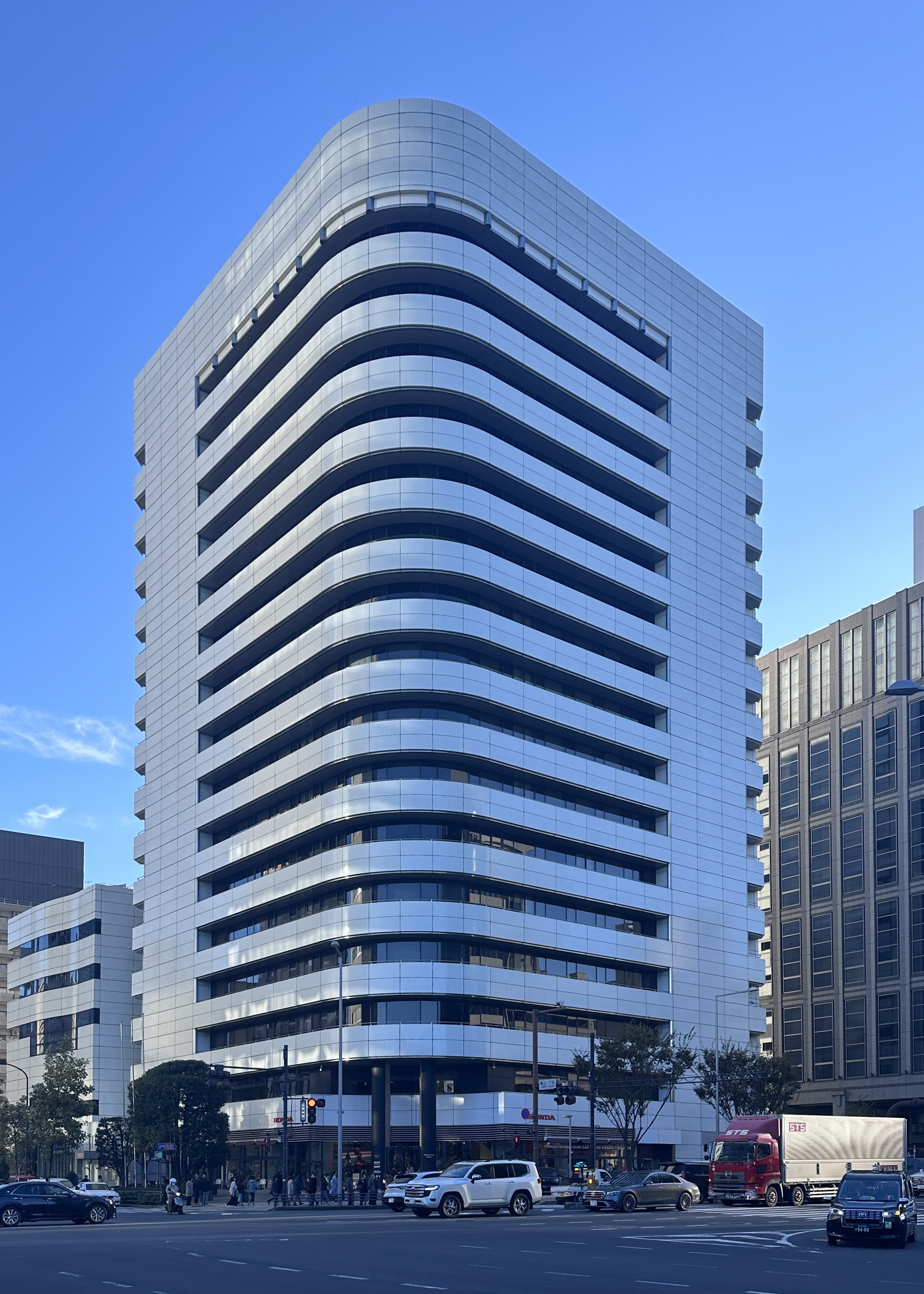
The former headquarters in Minami-Aoyama, Minato, Tokyo, in use from 1985 to 2025. The building will be demolished to make room for a new building, scheduled for completion by the 2030 Japanese fiscal year.

Honda Motor Co., Ltd., (Note: Japanese: 本田技研工業株式会社, Hepburn: Honda Giken Kōgyō Kabushiki gaisha; IPA: [honda ɡikẽŋ koːɡʲoː]; /ˈhɒndə/) commonly known as Honda, is a Japanese multinational conglomerate automotive manufacturer headquartered at the Toranomon Alcea Tower in Toranomon, Minato, Tokyo, Japan.

Founded in October 1946 by Soichiro Honda, Honda has been the world's largest motorcycle manufacturer since 1959, reaching a production of 500 million as of May 2025. It is the world's largest manufacturer of internal combustion engines measured by number of units, producing more than 14 million internal combustion engines each year. Honda became the second-largest Japanese automobile manufacturer in 2001. As of 2026, Honda is one of the world's major manufacturers, with an estimated market capitalization of around US$32,000,000,000. Honda was the eighth largest automobile manufacturer in the world. Honda has built and sold the most produced motor vehicle in history, the Honda Super Cub.

Honda was the first Japanese automobile manufacturer to release a dedicated luxury brand, Acura, in March 1986. Aside from its core automobile and motorcycle businesses, Honda also manufactures garden equipment, marine engines, personal watercraft, power generators, and other products. Since 1986, Honda has been involved with artificial intelligence/robotics research and released its ASIMO robot in 2000. It has ventured into aerospace with the establishment of GE Honda Aero Engines in 2004 and the Honda HA-420 HondaJet, which began production in 2012. Honda has four joint-ventures in China: Dongfeng Honda, GAC Honda, Wuyang Honda and Sundiro Honda.

In 2013, Honda invested about 5.7% (US$6.8 billion) of its revenues into research and development. Also in 2013, Honda became the first Japanese automaker to be a net exporter from the United States, exporting 108,705 Honda and Acura models, while importing only 88,357.

== History ==
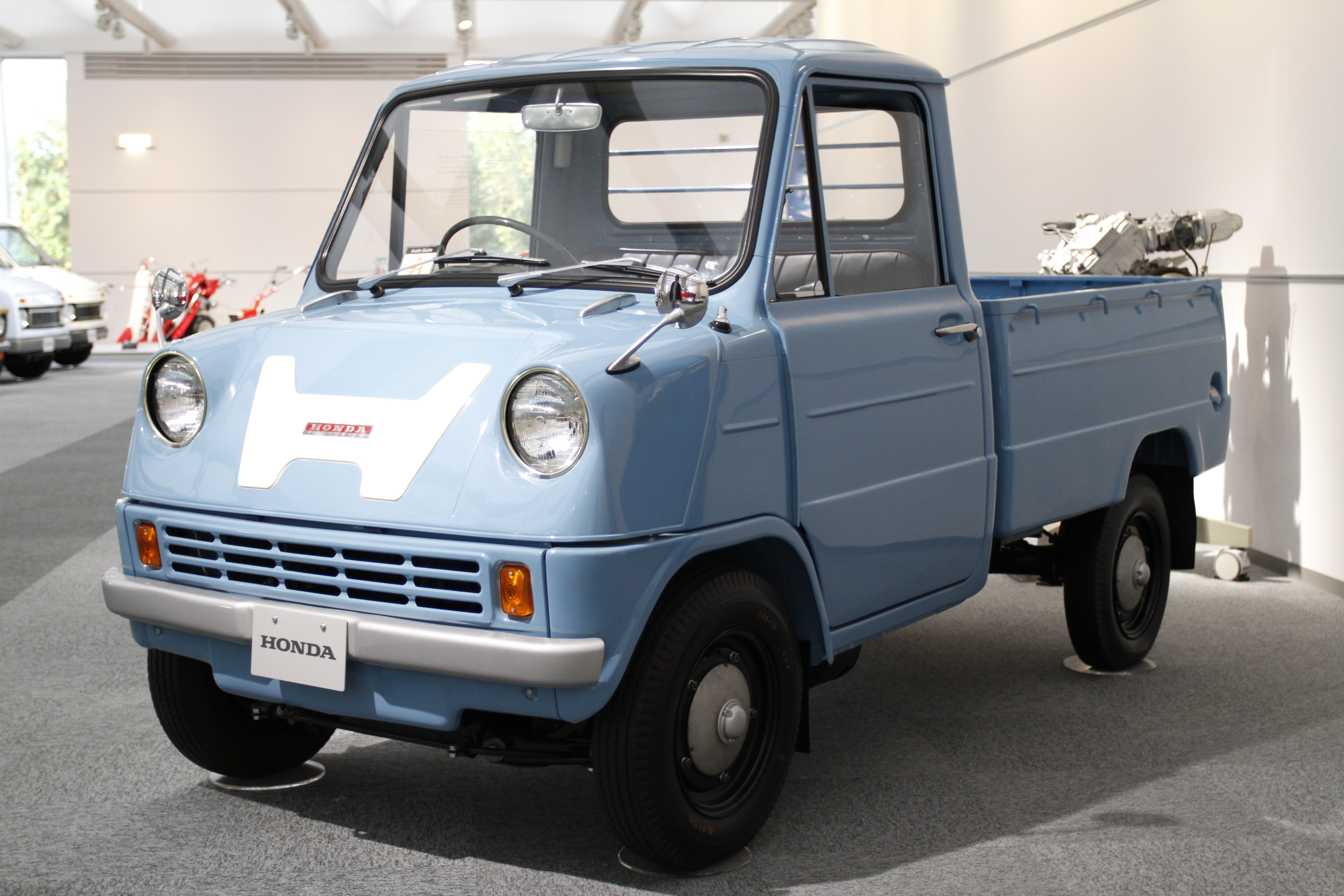
Honda's foray into four-wheelers started with the Honda T360 in 1963.

Throughout his life, Honda's founder, Soichiro Honda (1906–1991), had an interest in automobiles. He worked as a mechanic at the Art Shokai garage, where he tuned cars and entered them in races. In 1937, with financing from his acquaintance Kato Shichirō, Honda founded Tōkai Seiki (Eastern Sea Precision Machine Company) to make piston rings working out of the Art Shokai garage. After initial failures, Tōkai Seiki won a contract to supply piston rings to Toyota, but lost the contract due to the poor quality of their products. After attending engineering school without graduating, and visiting factories around Japan to better understand Toyota's quality control processes known as "five whys", by 1941, Honda was able to mass-produce piston rings acceptable to Toyota, using an automated process that could employ even unskilled wartime laborers.

Tōkai Seiki was placed under the control of the Ministry of Commerce and Industry (called the Ministry of Munitions after 1943) at the start of World War II, and Soichiro Honda was demoted from president to senior managing director after Toyota took a 40% stake in the company. Honda also aided the war effort by assisting other companies in automating the production of military aircraft propellers.

The relationships Honda cultivated with personnel at Toyota, Nakajima Aircraft Company, and the Imperial Japanese Navy were instrumental in the postwar period. A US B-29 bomber attack destroyed Tōkai Seiki's Yamashita plant in 1944, and the Itawa plant collapsed on 13 January during the 1945 Mikawa earthquake. Soichiro Honda sold the salvageable remains of the company to Toyota after the war for ¥450,000 and used the proceeds to found the Honda Technical Research Institute in October 1946.

With a staff of 12 men working in a 16 m^{2} (170 sq ft) shack, they built and sold improvised motorized bicycles, using a supply of 500 two-stroke 50 cc Tohatsu war surplus radio generator engines. When the engines ran out, Honda began building their own copy of the Tohatsu engine, and supplying these to customers to attach to their bicycles. This was the Honda A-Type, nicknamed the Bata Bata for the sound the engine made. In 1949, the Honda Technical Research Institute was liquidated for ¥1,000,000, or about US$5,000 today; these funds were used to incorporate Honda Motor Co., Ltd. At about the same time Honda hired engineer Kihachiro Kawashima, and Takeo Fujisawa who provided indispensable business and marketing expertise to complement Soichiro Honda's technical bent. The close partnership between Soichiro Honda and Fujisawa lasted until they stepped down together in October 1973.

The first complete motorcycle with both the frame and engine made by Honda was the 1949 D-Type, the first Honda to go by the name Dream. In 1961, Honda achieved its first Grand Prix victories and World Championships in the 125 cc and 250 cc categories. Honda Motor Company grew in a short time to become the world's largest manufacturer of motorcycles by 1964.

The first production automobile from Honda was the T360 mini pick-up truck, which went on sale in August 1963. Powered by a small 356 cc straight-4 gasoline engine, it was classified under the cheaper Kei car tax bracket. The second production car from Honda was the S500 sports car, which followed the T360 into production in October 1963. Its chain-driven rear wheels pointed to Honda's motorcycle origins.

Over the next few decades, Honda worked to expand its product line, operations, and exports to numerous countries around the world. In 1986, Honda introduced the successful Acura brand to the American market in an attempt to gain ground in the luxury vehicle market. The year 1991 saw the introduction of the Honda NSX supercar, the first all-aluminum monocoque vehicle that incorporated a mid-engine V6 with variable-valve timing.

In 1990, CEO Tadashi Kume was succeeded by Nobuhiko Kawamoto. Kawamoto was selected over Shoichiro Irimajiri, who oversaw the successful establishment of Honda of America Manufacturing, Inc. in Marysville, Ohio. Irimajiri and Kawamoto shared a friendly rivalry within Honda; owing to health issues, Irimajiri would resign in 1992.

Following the death of Soichiro Honda and the departure of Irimajiri, Honda found itself quickly being outpaced in product development by other Japanese automakers and was caught off-guard by the truck and sport utility vehicle boom of the 1990s, all of which took a toll on the profitability of the company. Japanese media reported in 1992 and 1993 that Honda was at serious risk of an unwanted and hostile takeover by Mitsubishi Motors, which at the time was a larger automaker by volume and was flush with profits from its successful Pajero and Diamante models.

Kawamoto acted quickly to change Honda's corporate culture, rushing through market-driven product development that resulted in recreational vehicles such as the first-generation Odyssey and the CR-V, and a refocusing away from some of the numerous sedans and coupes that were popular with the company's engineers but not with the buying public. The most shocking change to Honda came when Kawamoto ended the company's successful participation in Formula One after the 1992 season, citing costs in light of the takeover threat from Mitsubishi as well as the desire to create a more environmentally friendly company image.

The Honda Aircraft Company was established in 2006 as a wholly owned subsidiary to manufacture and sell the HondaJet family of aircraft. The first deliveries to customers began in December 2015. In February 2015, Honda announced that CEO and President Takanobu Ito would step down and be replaced by Takahiro Hachigo in June 2015. Additional retirements by senior managers and directors were expected.

In October 2019, Honda was reported to be in talks with Hitachi to merge the two companies' car parts businesses, creating a components supplier with almost $17 billion in annual sales.

In January 2020, Honda announced that it would be withdrawing employees working in the city of Wuhan, Hubei, China due to the COVID-19 pandemic. On 23 March 2020 due to the global spread of the virus, Honda became the first major automaker with operations in the US to suspend production in its factories. It resumed automobile, engine and transmission production at its US plants on 11 May 2020. Honda and General Motors announced in September 2020 a North American alliance to begin in 2021. According to The Detroit Free Press, "The proposed alliance will include sharing a range of vehicles, to be sold under each company's distinct brands, as well as cooperation in purchasing, research and development, and connected services." In 2021, Honda announced its intention to become the world's first carmaker to sell a vehicle with level 3 self-driving technology.

In March 2022, Honda announced it would develop and build electric vehicles in a joint venture with electronics giant Sony. The latter is set to provide its imaging, sensing, network and other technologies while Honda would be responsible for the car manufacturing processes. The Sony Honda Mobility company was officially announced on 13 October 2022 with pre-orders said to open in 2025 and the release of the first EVs scheduled for 2026 in the US under the "Afeela" brand.

In February 2023, Honda announced a deal with American car company General Motors to produce cars using a new hydrogen fuel system. The aim is to ramp up the hydrogen powered cells in their Electric vehicles as well as trucks, construction machinery, and power stations. In March 2023, Honda recalled 500,000 vehicles in the United States and Canada due to an issue with seat belts in the car not latching correctly. Among the models recalled were the 2017-2020 CR-V, the 2018 and 2019 Accord, the 2018-2020 Odyssey, the 2019 Insight, and the Acura RDX from 2019 and 2020. According to the recall, the seat belts in the front seats would break open on impact increasing the risk of injury in a crash. On 21 December 2023, Honda announced a global recall of about 4.5 million vehicles, including 2.54 million in the US, over fuel pump failures, following earlier recalls in 2021 and 2020 for the same issue.

In March 2026, Honda announced the cancellation of the 0 Saloon, 0 SUV and Acura RSX due to profit losses, shifting its focus towards hybrids.

=== Attempted merger with Nissan ===
On 23 December 2024, Honda announced an MOU had been entered to merge with fellow automaker Nissan, to become the 3rd largest auto company by sales. Mitsubishi Motors, in which Nissan has 24% ownership, also agreed to join the talks of integration. The merger was set with a deadline of 2026. Mitsubishi announced it would make a decision on merging with the new company by the end of January 2025.

In February 2025, Honda and Nissan announced that their boards had voted to end talks to merge. Nissan reportedly backed out of the talks with larger rival Honda after negotiations were complicated by growing differences, including Honda's proposal that Nissan become a subsidiary. Despite ending the merger talks, Honda and Nissan continued their technical partnership. In August 2026, the companies signed a joint-development agreement to standardize core electronic control units, an in-vehicle operating system, middleware and vehicle-control software for future software-defined vehicles, with deployment targeted from fiscal 2029.

== Senior leadership ==
- Chairman: Toshiaki Mikoshiba (since April 2019)
- President and Chief Executive: Toshihiro Mibe (since April 2021)

=== Previous CEOs ===
- Soichiro Honda (1948–1973)
- Kiyoshi Kawashima (1973–1983)
- Tadashi Kume (1983–1990)
- Nobuhiko Kawamoto (1990–1998)
- Hiroyuki Yoshino (1998–2003)
- Takeo Fukui (2003–2009)
- Takanobu Ito (2009–2015)
- Takahiro Hachigo (2015–2021)

== Corporate profile and divisions ==
Sales by business (2024)
Business	share
Automobile	66.4%
Financial services	15.9%
Motorcycle	15.8%
Power products and others	1.9%

Honda is headquartered in Minato, Tokyo, Japan. Their shares trade on the Tokyo Stock Exchange and the New York Stock Exchange, as well as exchanges in Osaka, Nagoya, Sapporo, Kyoto, Fukuoka, London, Paris, and Switzerland.

Honda has assembly plants around the globe. These plants are located in China, the United States, Pakistan, Canada, England, Japan, Belgium, Brazil, México, New Zealand, Malaysia, Indonesia, India, Philippines, Thailand, Vietnam, Turkey, Taiwan, Perú and Argentina. As of July 2010, 89% of Honda and Acura vehicles sold in the United States were built in North American plants, up from 82.2% a year earlier. This shields profits from the yen's advance to a 15-year high against the dollar.

American Honda Motor Company is based in Torrance, California. Honda Racing Corporation (HRC) is Honda's motorsport division. Honda Canada Inc. is headquartered in Markham, Ontario, it was originally planned to be located in Richmond Hill, Ontario, but delays led it to look elsewhere. Its manufacturing division, Honda of Canada Manufacturing, is based in Alliston, Ontario. Honda has also created joint ventures around the world, such as Honda Siel Cars and Hero Honda Motorcycles in India, Guangzhou Honda and Dongfeng Honda in China, Boon Siew Honda in Malaysia and Honda Atlas in Pakistan.

In November 2026, Honda announced plans to invest $3 billion in a new auto plant in central Ohio, United States, with production expected to begin in 2029. The plant will be able to produce 240,000 vehicles annually and create more than 2,000 jobs. It will manufacture multiple vehicle types, including hybrid-electric, gasoline-powered and battery-electric models. The company projected that the investments would increase its annual auto production capacity in the US to 1.3 million vehicles and its North American capacity to 1.9 million.

Honda is also making a C$166 million investment in its Honda of Canada Manufacturing facilities in Alliston, Ontario, as part of a broader C$867 million commitment, while maintaining the workforce of more than 4,000 employees at the facilities. The investment will support the production of next-generation hybrid-electric and gasoline-powered models, including the reintroduction of engine manufacturing.

Honda runs a business innovation initiative called Honda Xcelerator, to build relationships with innovators, partner with Silicon Valley startups and entrepreneurs, and help other companies work on prototypes. Xcelerator had worked with reportedly 40 companies as of January 2019. Xcelerator and a developer studio are part of the Honda Innovations group, formed in Spring 2017 and based in Mountain View, California. Through Honda Mobilityland, Honda operates the Suzuka Circuit and Twin Ring Motegi racing tracks.

Following the 2011 Tohoku earthquake and tsunami in Japan, Honda announced plans to halve production at its UK plants. The decision was made to put staff at the Swindon plant on a 2-day week until the end of May as the manufacturer struggled to source supplies from Japan. It's thought around 22,500 cars were produced during this period.

=== Finances ===
For the fiscal year 2018, Honda reported earnings of US$9.534 billion, with an annual revenue of US$138.250 billion, an increase of 6.2% over the previous fiscal cycle. Honda's shares traded at over $32 per share, and its market capitalization was valued at US$50.4 billion in October 2018.

In May 2026, Honda reported a net loss of 423.9 billion yen (approximately US$2.7 billion) for the fiscal year ending March 2026 — the company's first-ever full-year loss — attributed primarily to heavy costs associated with its electric vehicle strategy and the impact of President Trump's tariff and regulatory policies on the U.S. automotive market.

Year	Revenue (million US$)	Net income (million US$)	Total assets (million US$)	Employees
2005	77,851	4,376	83,853	—N/a
2006	89,172	5,373	95,145	—N/a
2007	99,784	5,331	108,329	167,231
2008	108,026	5,400	113,540	178,960
2009	100,112	1,370	118,189	181,876
2010	92,655	3,052	125,594	176,815
2011	107,242	6,762	138,851	179,060
2012	100,941	2,820	149,616	187,094
2013	119,523	4,443	164,988	190,338
2014	118,425	5,741	156,220	198,368
2015	121,286	4,636	167,675	204,730
2016	121,190	2,860	151,303	208,399
2017	130,193	5,734	176,311	211,915
2018	138,250	9,534	174,143	215,638
2019	142,998	5,493	183,772	219,722
2020	137,365	4,193	188,246	218,674
2021	123,803	6,180	206,058	211,374
2022	129,519	6,293	213,361	218,674
2023	125,117	4,820	182,559	197,039
2024	140,959	7,640	205,442	194,993

Honda net sales and other operating revenue by geographic region, 2024
Geographic region	Total revenue (million ¥)	in %
North America	10,470,000	51.23%
Asia	4,290,000	21.02%
Japan	1,960,000	9.59%
Europe	943,000	4.62%
Others	1,150,000	5.63%

== Products ==
=== Automobiles ===
Honda vehicles

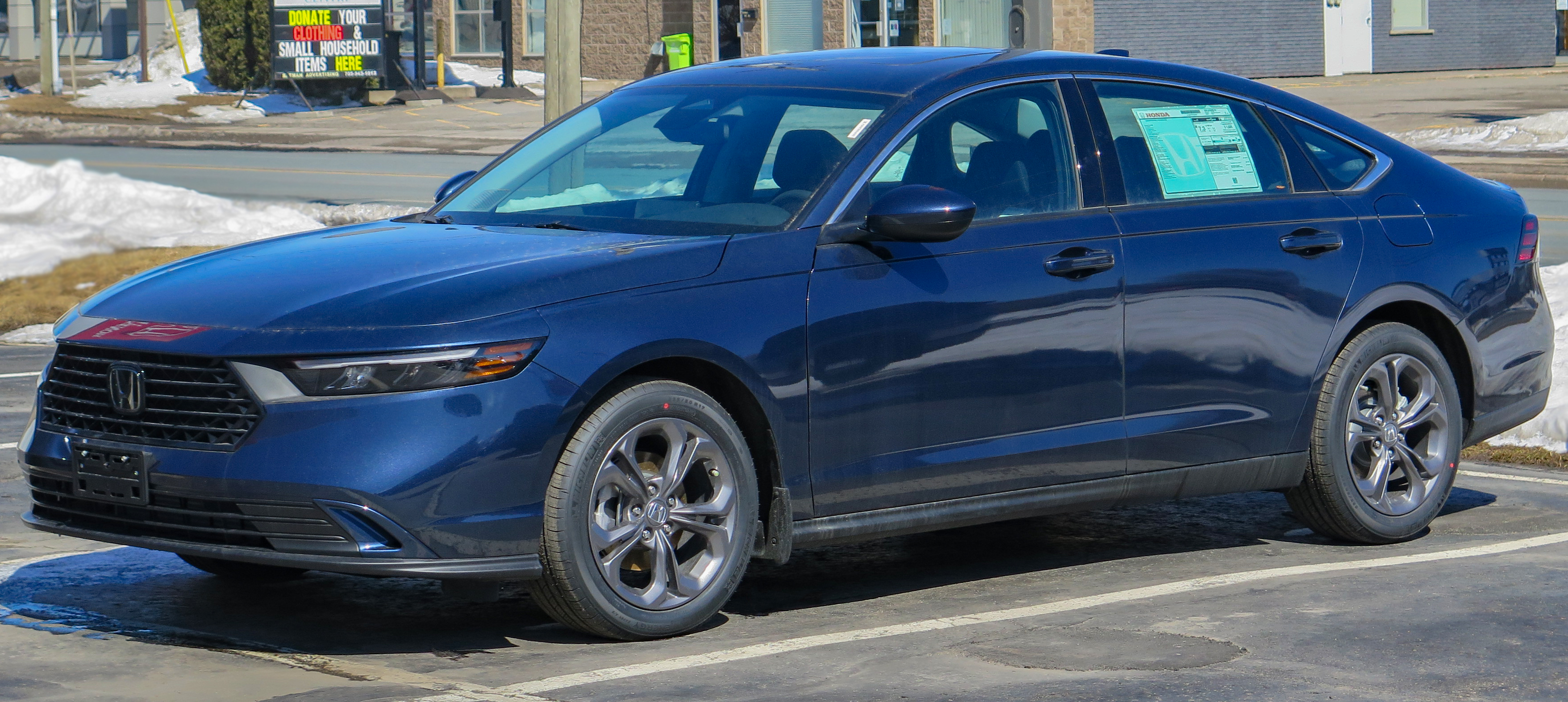
Eleventh-generation Accord

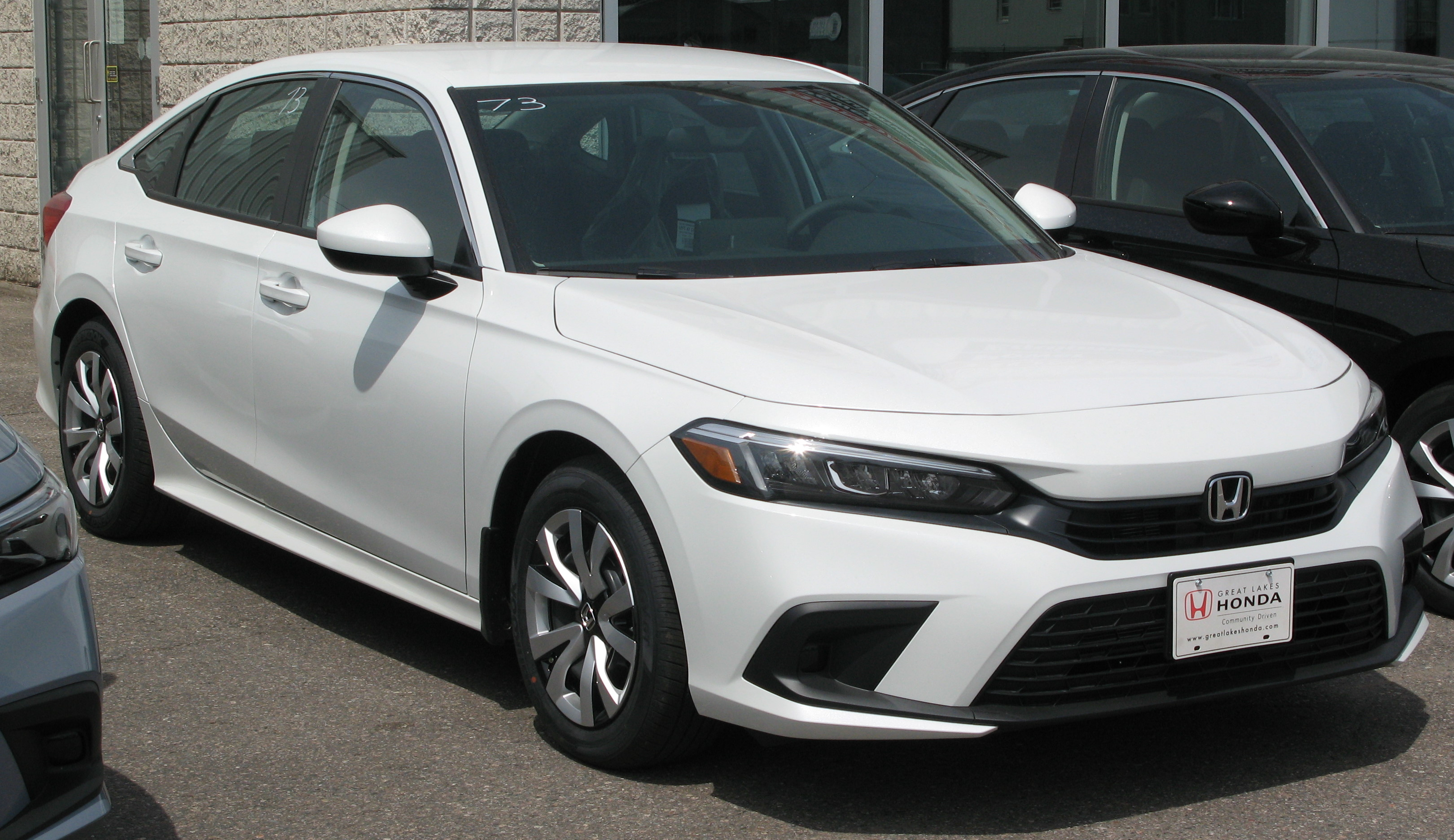
Eleventh-generation Civic

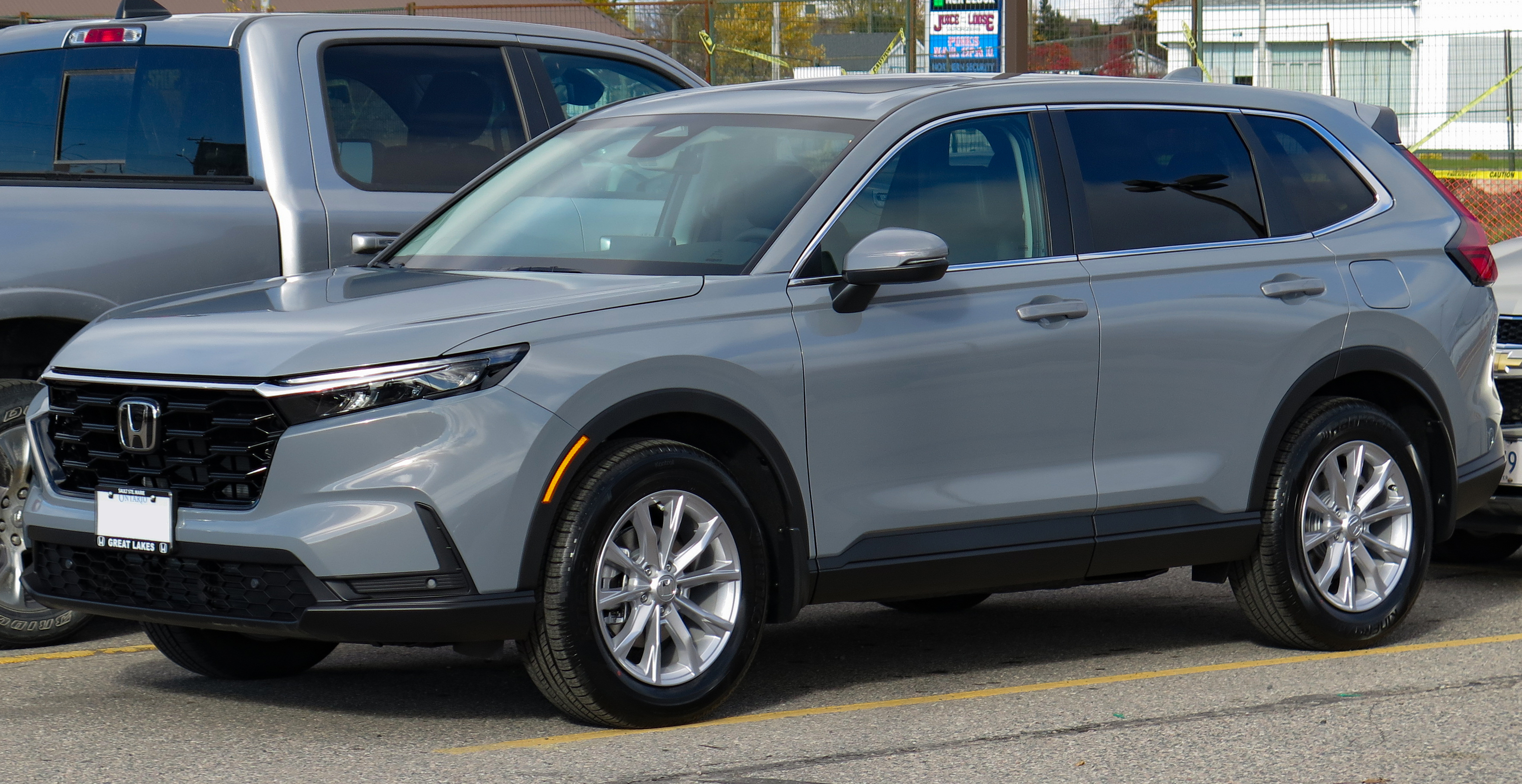
Sixth-generation CR-V

Honda's automotive manufacturing ambitions can be traced back to 1963, with the Honda T360, a Kei truck built for the Japanese market. This was followed by the two-door roadster, the Honda S500 also introduced in 1963. In 1965, Honda built a two-door commercial delivery van, named the Honda L700. Honda's first four-door sedan was not the Honda Accord, but the air-cooled, four-cylinder, gasoline-powered Honda 1300 which was introduced in 1969. The Civic was a hatchback that gained wide popularity internationally, but it wasn't the first two-door hatchback built by Honda. That was the Honda N360, a Kei car that was adapted for international sale as the N600. The Civic, which appeared in 1972 and replaced the N600 also had a smaller sibling that replaced the air-cooled N360, called the Honda Life, which was water-cooled.

The Honda Life represented Honda's efforts in competing in the kei car segment, offering sedan, delivery van and small pick-up platforms on a shared chassis. The Life Step Van had a novel approach that, while not initially a commercial success, appeared to be an influence to vehicles with the front passengers sitting behind the engine, a large cargo area with a flat roof and a liftgate installed in back, and utilizing a transversely installed engine with a front-wheel-drive powertrain.

As Honda entered into automobile manufacturing in the late 1960s where Japanese manufacturers such as Toyota and Nissan had been making cars since before WWII, Honda instilled a sense of doing things a little differently than its Japanese competitors. Its mainstay products like the Accord and Civic (with the exception of its USA-market 1993–97 Passport which was part of a vehicle exchange program with Isuzu (part of the Subaru-Isuzu joint venture)) have always employed Front-wheel drive powertrain implementation, which is currently a long-held Honda tradition. Honda also installed new technologies into its products, first as optional equipment, then later standard, like anti-lock brakes, speed-sensitive power steering, and multi-port fuel injection in the early 1980s. This desire to be the first to try new approaches is evident with the creation of the first Japanese luxury chain Acura, and was also evident with the all-aluminum, mid-engined sports car, the Honda NSX, which also introduced variable valve timing technology, which Honda calls VTEC.

The Civic family is a line of compact cars developed and manufactured by Honda. In North America, the Civic is the second-longest continuously running nameplate from a Japanese manufacturer; only its perennial rival, the Toyota Corolla, introduced in 1966, has been in production longer. The Civic, along with the Accord and Prelude, comprised Honda's vehicles sold in North America until the 1990s, when the model lineup was expanded. Having gone through several generational changes, the Civic has become larger and more upmarket, and it currently slots between the Fit and Accord.

Honda's first hybrid electric vehicle was the 1999 Insight. The Civic was first offered as a hybrid in 2001, and the Accord followed in 2004. In 2008, the company launched the Clarity, a fuel cell car.

In 2008, Honda increased global production to meet the demand for small cars and hybrids in the US and emerging markets. The company shuffled US production to keep factories busy and boost car output while building fewer minivans and sport utility vehicles as light truck sales fell. Its first entrance into the pickup segment, the light-duty Ridgeline, won Truck of the Year from Motor Trend magazine in 2006. Also in 2006, the redesigned Civic won Car of the Year from the magazine, giving Honda a rare double win of Motor Trend honors. It is reported that Honda plans to increase hybrid sales in Japan to more than 20% of its total sales in the fiscal year 2011, from 14.8% in the previous year.

Five of United States Environmental Protection Agency's top ten most fuel-efficient cars from 1984 to 2010 come from Honda, more than any other automakers. The five models are: 2000–2006 Honda Insight (53 mpg_{‑US} or 4.4 L/100 km or 64 mpg_{‑imp} combined), 1986–1987 Honda Civic Coupe HF (46 mpg_{‑US} or 5.1 L/100 km or 55 mpg_{‑imp} combined), 1994–1995 Honda Civic hatchback VX (43 mpg_{‑US} or 5.5 L/100 km or 52 mpg_{‑imp} combined), 2006– Honda Civic Hybrid (42 mpg_{‑US} or 5.6 L/100 km or 50 mpg_{‑imp} combined), and 2010– Honda Insight (41 mpg_{‑US} or 5.7 L/100 km or 49 mpg_{‑imp} combined). The ACEEE has also rated the Civic GX as the greenest car in America for seven consecutive years.

Honda currently builds vehicles in factories located in Japan, the United States of America, Canada, China, Pakistan, the United Kingdom, Malaysia, Belgium, Brazil, Indonesia, India, Thailand, Turkey, Argentina, Mexico, Taiwan, and the Philippines.

=== Motorcycles ===
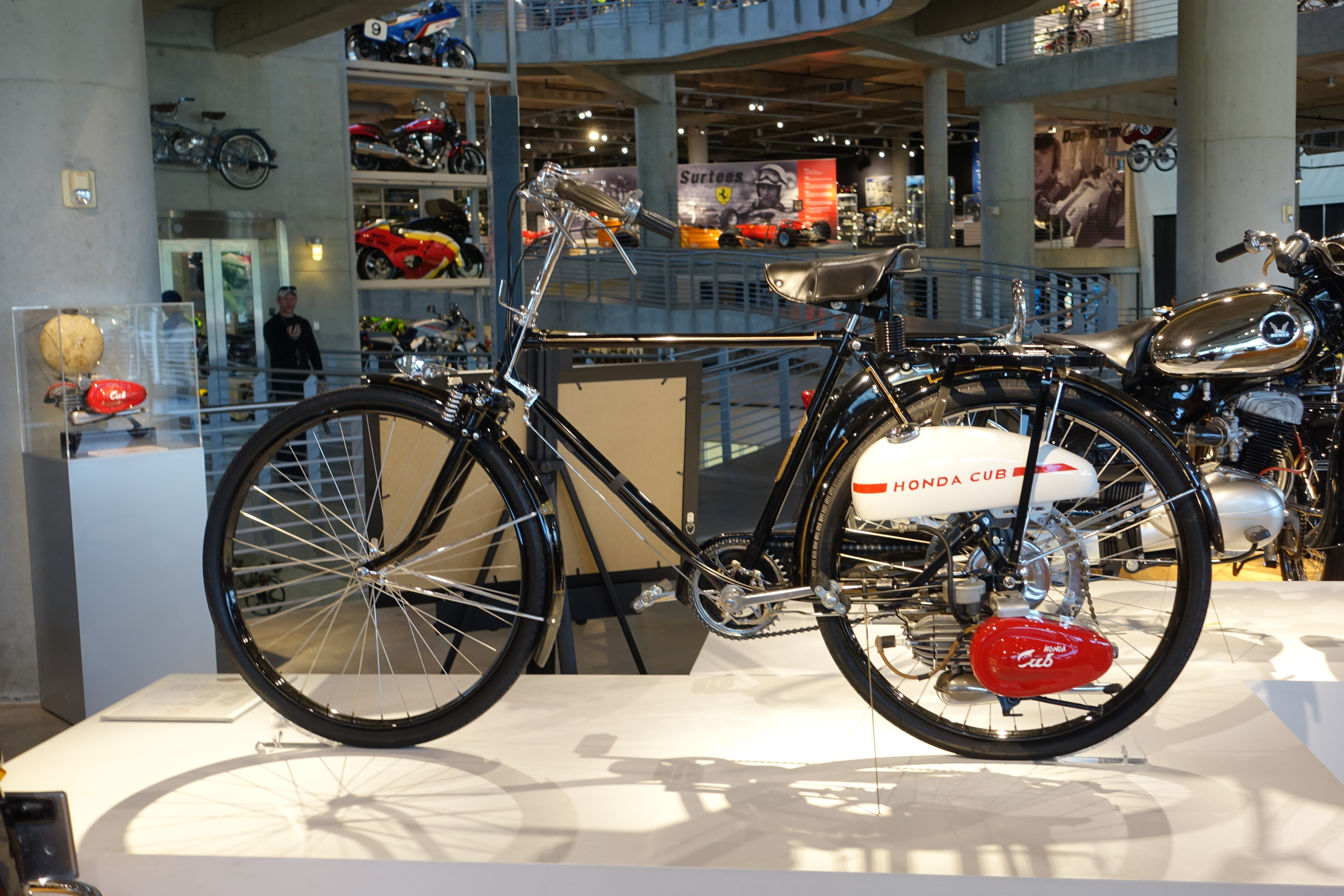
1953 Honda Cub on display at the Barber Vintage Motorsports Museum, Birmingham, Alabama. The two-stroke single-cylinder motorcycle had a displacement of 58 cc and a top speed of 40 km/h (25 mph).

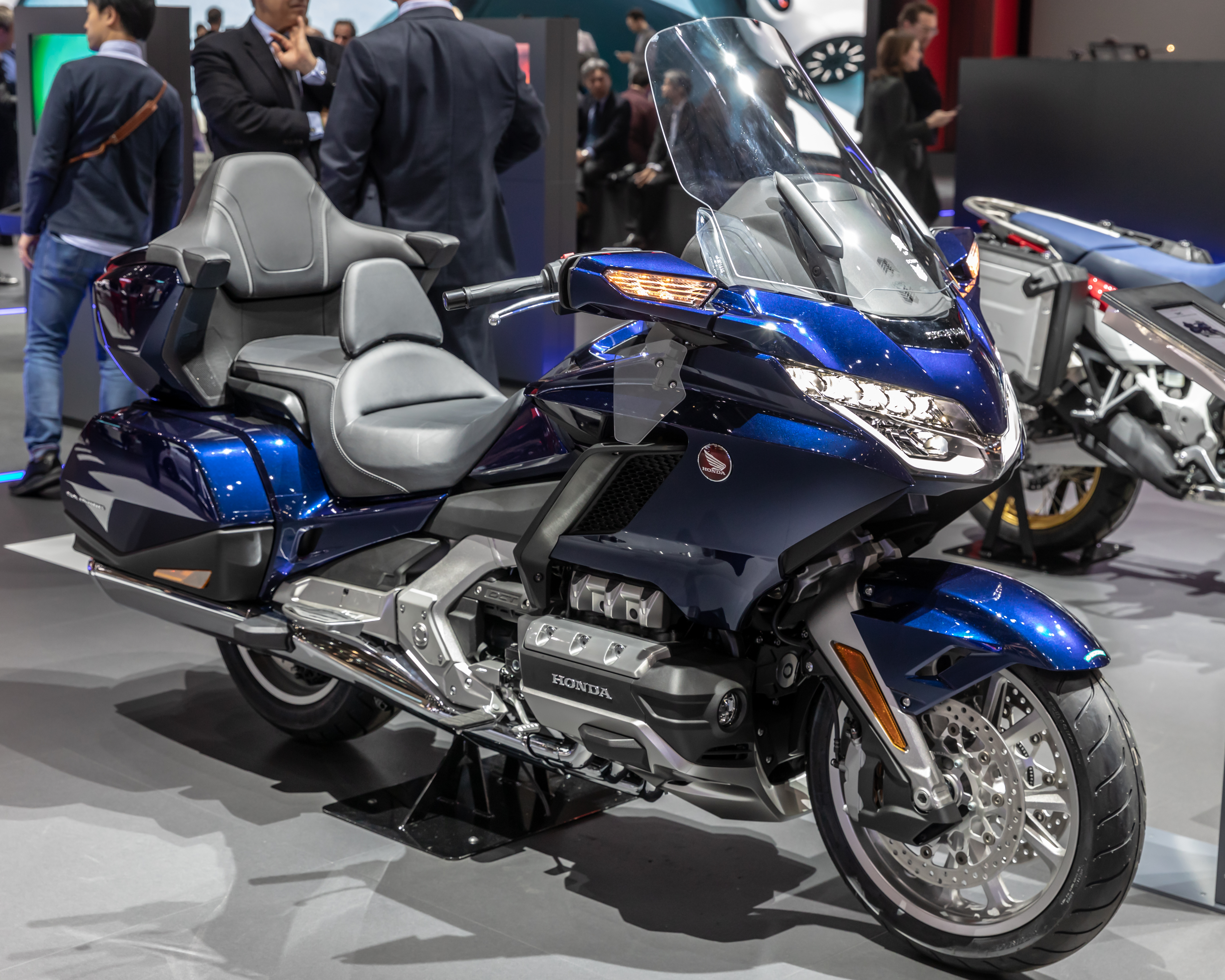
Honda Gold Wing bike

Honda is the largest motorcycle manufacturer in Japan and has been since it started production in 1955. At its peak in 1982, Honda manufactured almost three million motorcycles annually. By 2006, this figure had been reduced to around 550,000 but was still higher than its three domestic competitors. In 2017, India became the largest motorcycle market for Honda. In India, Honda is leading in the scooters segment, with 59% market share.

During the 1960s when it was a small manufacturer, Honda broke out of the Japanese motorcycle market and began exporting to the United States. Working with the advertising agency Grey Advertising, Honda created an innovative marketing campaign, using the slogan "You meet the nicest people on a Honda." In contrast to the prevailing negative stereotypes of motorcyclists in America as tough, antisocial rebels, this campaign suggested that Honda motorcycles were made for the everyman. The campaign was hugely successful; the ads ran for three years, and by the end of 1963 alone, Honda had sold 90,000 motorcycles.

Taking Honda's story as an archetype of the smaller manufacturer entering a new market already occupied by highly dominant competitors, the story of their market entry, and their subsequent huge success in the US and around the world has been the subject of some academic controversy. Competing explanations have been advanced to explain Honda's strategy and the reasons for their success.

The first of these explanations was put forward when, in 1975, the Boston Consulting Group (BCG) was commissioned by the UK government to write a report explaining why and how the British motorcycle industry had been out-competed by its Japanese competitors. The report concluded that the Japanese firms, including Honda, had sought a very high scale of production (they had made a large number of motorbikes) in order to benefit from economies of scale and learning curve effects. It blamed the decline of the British motorcycle industry on the failure of British managers to invest enough in their businesses to profit from economies of scale and scope.

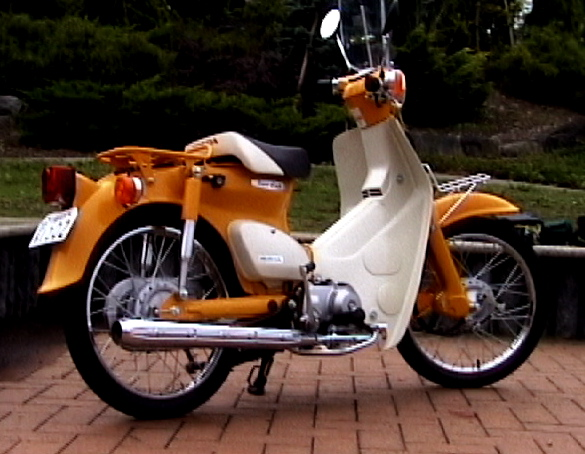
2004 Honda Super Cub

The second explanation was offered in 1984 by Richard Pascale, who had interviewed the Honda executives responsible for the firm's entry into the US market. As opposed to the tightly focused strategy of low cost and high scale that BCG accredited to Honda, Pascale found that its entry into the US market was a story of "miscalculation, serendipity, and organizational learning" – in other words, Honda's success was due to the adaptability and hard work of its staff, rather than any long-term strategy. For example, Honda's initial plan on entering the US market was to compete in large motorcycles, around 300 cc. Honda's motorcycles in this class suffered performance and reliability problems when ridden the relatively long distances of the US highways. When the team found that the scooters they were using to get themselves around their US base of San Francisco attracted positive interest from consumers they fell back on selling the Super Cub instead.

The most recent school of thought on Honda's strategy was put forward by Gary Hamel and C. K. Prahalad in 1989. Creating the concept of core competencies with Honda as an example, they argued that Honda's success was due to its focus on leadership in the technology of internal combustion engines. For example, the high power-to-weight ratio engines Honda produced for its racing bikes provided technology and expertise which was transferable into mopeds. Honda's entry into the US motorcycle market during the 1960s is used as a case study for teaching introductory strategy at business schools worldwide.

=== ATVs ===
Honda builds utility ATVs under models Recon, Rubicon, Rancher, Foreman and Rincon. Honda also builds sports ATVs under the models TRX 90X, TRX 250X, TRX 400x, TRX 450R and TRX 700.

=== Power equipment ===
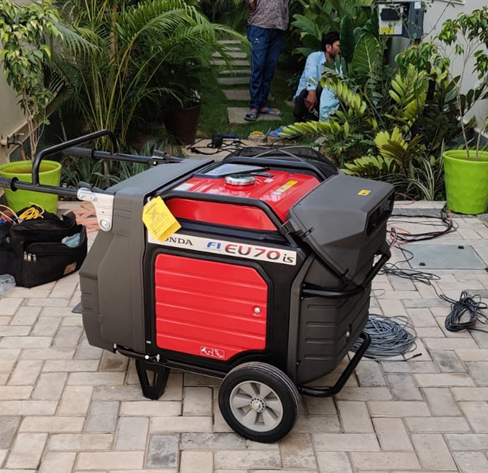
A Honda Power EU70is power generator

Power equipment production started in 1953 with H-type engine (prior to motorcycles). Honda power equipment reached record sales in 2007 with 6.4 million units sold annually. By 2010 (Fiscal year ended 31 March) this figure had decreased to 4.7 million units. Cumulative production of power products has exceeded 85 million units annually (as of September 2008).

In September 2023, Honda ceased sales of gasoline lawn mowers and some other power equipment in the US.

Honda power equipment includes:

- Engine
- Brush Cutters
- Tillers
- Marine Outboard Motors
- Water Pumps
- Cultivator
- Lawn mower
- Robotic lawn mower
- Riding mower
- Trimmer
- Mower
- Blower
- Sprayer
- Hedge trimmer
- Snowthrower
- Generator, welding power supply
- Pump
- Outboard engine
- Inflatable boat
- Electric 4-wheel Scooter
- Compact Household Cogeneration Unit

=== Engines ===
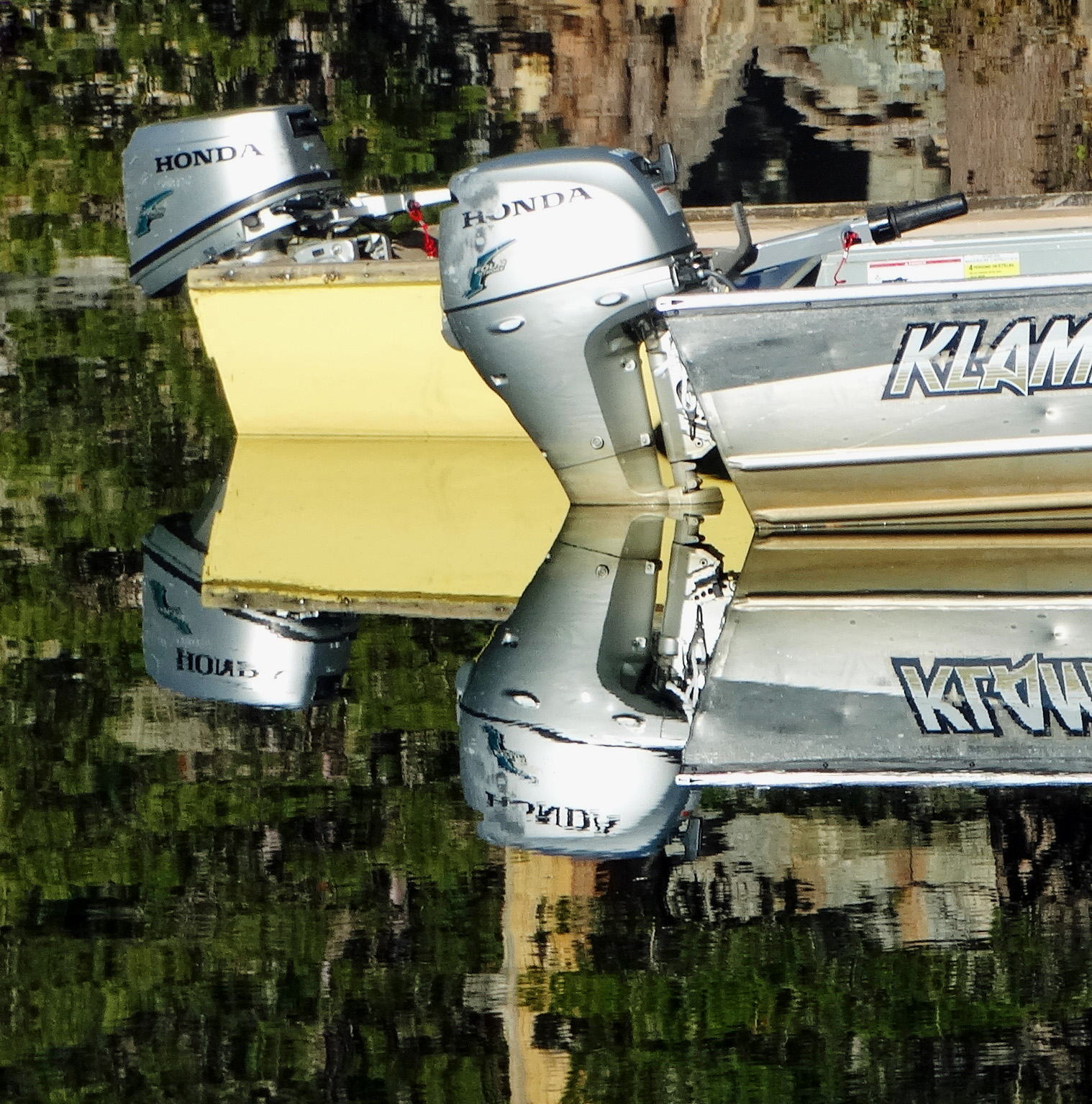
Honda Outboard motors

Honda engines powered the entire 33-car starting field of the 2010 Indianapolis 500 and for the fifth consecutive race, there were no engine-related retirements during the running of the Memorial Day Classic. In the 1980s Honda developed the GY6 engine for use in motor scooters. Although no longer manufactured by Honda, it's still commonly used in many Chinese, Korean and Taiwanese light vehicles.

Honda, despite being known as an engine company, has never built a V8 engine for passenger vehicles. In the late 1990s, the company resisted considerable pressure from its American dealers for a V8 engine (which would have seen use in top-of-the-line Honda SUVs and Acuras), with American Honda reportedly sending one dealer a shipment of V8 beverages to silence them. Honda considered starting V8 production in the mid-2000s for larger Acura sedans, a new version of the high-end NSX sports car (which previously used DOHC V6 engines with VTEC to achieve its high power output) and possible future ventures into the American full-size truck and SUV segment for both the Acura and Honda brands, but this was canceled in late 2008, with Honda citing environmental and worldwide economic conditions as reasons for the termination of this project.

=== Robots ===
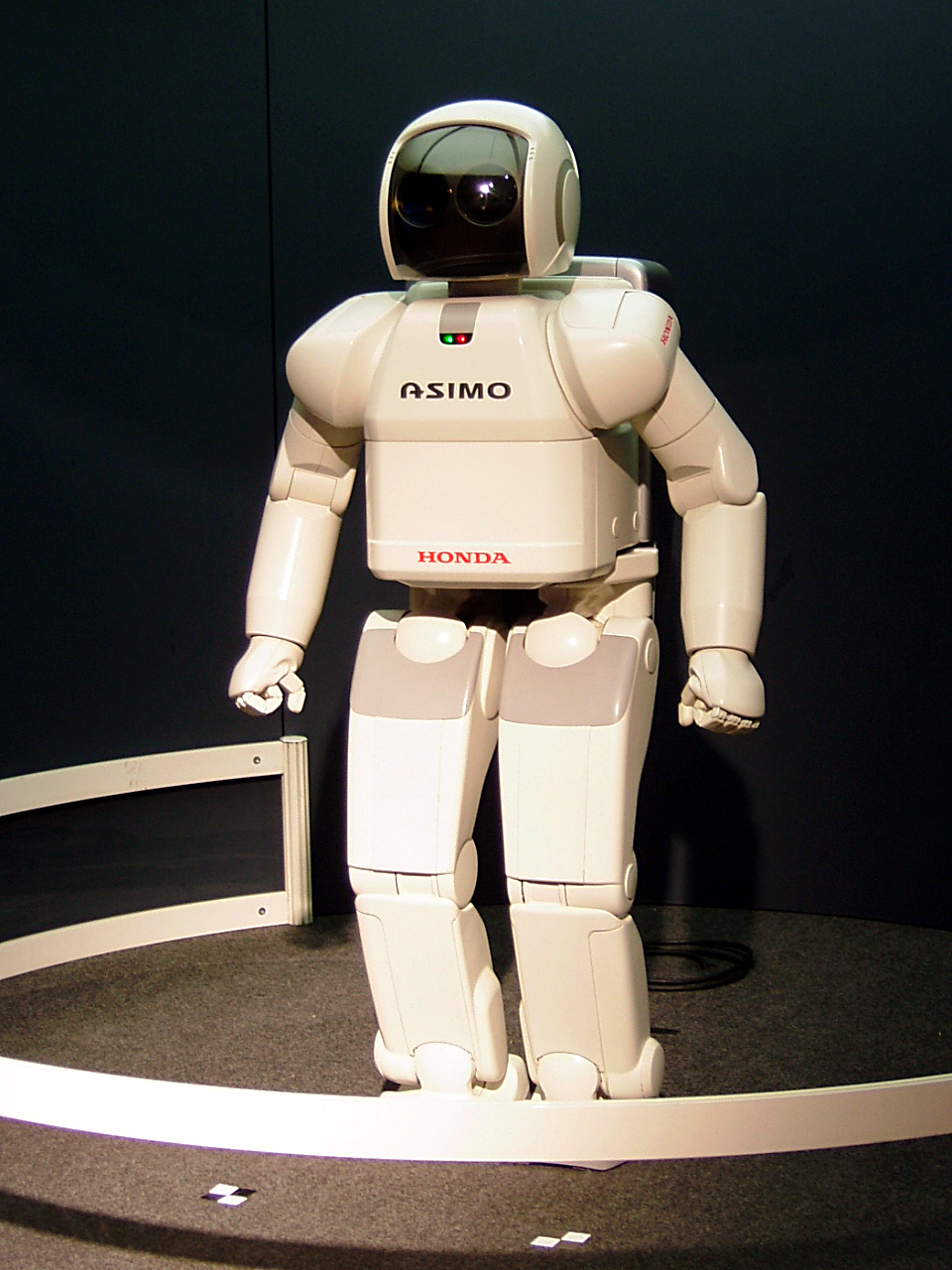
ASIMO at Expo 2005

ASIMO is part of Honda's Research & Development robotics program. It's the eleventh in a line of successive builds starting in 1986 with Honda E0 moving through the ensuing Honda E series and the Honda P series. Weighing 54 kilograms and standing 130 centimeters tall, ASIMO resembles a small astronaut wearing a backpack, and can walk on two feet in a manner resembling human locomotion, at up to 6 km/h (3.7 mph). ASIMO is the world's only humanoid robot able to ascend and descend stairs independently. However, human motions such as climbing stairs are difficult to mimic with a machine, which ASIMO has demonstrated by taking two plunges off a staircase.

ASIMO is able to walk, dance and navigate steps. In 2010, Honda developed a machine capable of reading a user's brainwaves to move ASIMO. The system uses a helmet covered with electroencephalography and near-infrared spectroscopy sensors that monitor electrical brainwaves and cerebral blood flow signals that alter slightly during the human thought process. The user thinks of one of the limited number of gestures it wants from the robot, which has been fitted with a Brain-Machine Interface.

=== Aircraft ===
Honda has also pioneered new technology in its HA-420 HondaJet, manufactured by its subsidiary Honda Aircraft Company, which allows new levels of reduced drag, increased aerodynamics and fuel efficiency thus reducing operating costs.

=== Mountain bikes ===
Honda has also built a downhill racing bicycle known as the Honda RN-01. It is not available for sale to the public. The bike has a gearbox, which replaces the standard derailleur found on most bikes.

Honda has hired several people to pilot the bike, among them Greg Minnaar. The team is known as Team G Cross Honda.

=== Rockets ===
In 2019, Honda began development of rocket engines. In June 2025, Honda successfully conducted a launch and landing test of an reusable launch vehicle in Taiki, Hokkaido. Honda has stated that it aims to make a sub-orbital spaceflight in 2029.

== Former products ==
=== Solar cells ===
Honda's solar cell subsidiary company Honda Soltec (Headquarters: Kikuchi-gun, Kumamoto; President and CEO: Akio Kazusa) started sales throughout Japan of thin-film solar cells for public and industrial use on October 24, 2008, after selling solar cells for residential use in October 2007. Honda announced in the end of October 2013 that Honda Soltec would cease business operations in the Spring of 2014 except for support for existing customers and the subsidiary would be dissolved.

== Motorsports ==
Honda has been active in motorsports, like Formula One, MotoGP and others, since the early years of the company. Since 2022, Honda's general motorsport activities have been managed by its motorsport subsidiary Honda Racing Corporation (HRC). Prior to 2022, Honda's motorcycle racing activities were run by HRC since it was founded in 1982, while its automobile racing activities were run as projects within the Honda Motor Company itself.

Honda Performance Development (HPD) was established in 1993 as the company's North American motorsport subsidiary, and for 2024 HPD became Honda Racing Corporation USA (HRC US) to form a global motorsports organization. Honda also owns two Japanese race tracks, the Suzuka Circuit and Mobility Resort Motegi (formerly Twin Ring Motegi), which it established in 1962 and 1997, respectively, and which are managed by Honda Mobilityland.

=== Automobiles ===
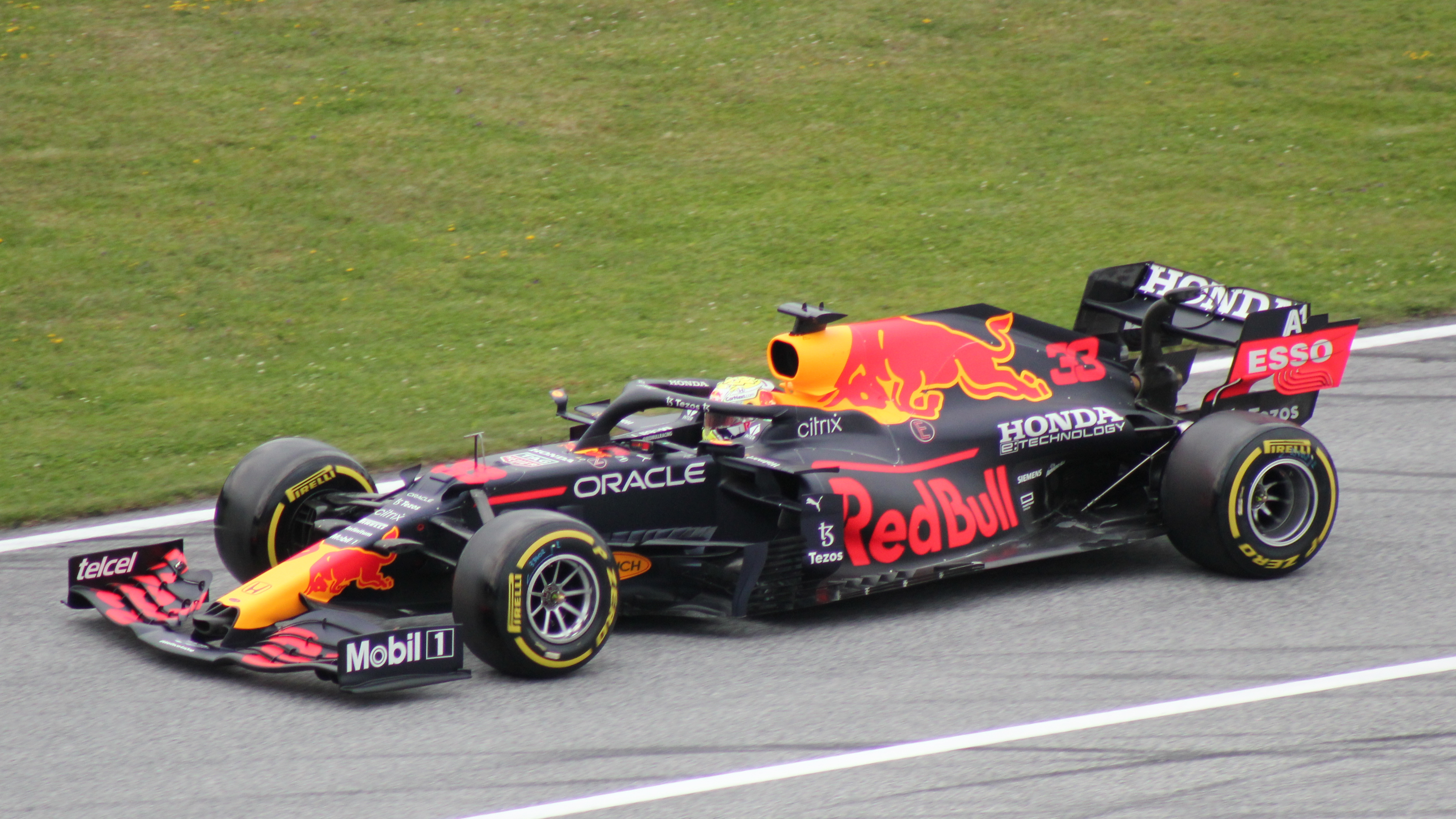
Max Verstappen won the 2021 Formula One World Championship with a Honda power unit.

Honda entered Formula One for the first time in 1964, just one year after starting the production of road cars, making both engine and chassis. Honda achieved its first victory at the 1965 Mexican Grand Prix, and another win at the 1967 Italian Grand Prix, before it withdrew after the 1968 season. They returned to the sport in 1983 as an engine manufacturer, remaining until 1992. This period saw Honda dominate Grand Prix racing, as between 1986 and 1991 it won five consecutive Drivers' Championships with Nelson Piquet, Ayrton Senna and Alain Prost, and six Constructors' titles with Williams and McLaren. A third stint from 2000 to 2008, initially as engine maker and later also as team owner, yielded 17 podiums, including one win, and second place in the 2004 constructors' standings. They returned as a power unit supplier for the second year of the hybrid era in 2015 and initially struggled, but intense development saw them become race winners again by 2019, and in 2021 it won the World Drivers' Championship with Max Verstappen and Red Bull Racing. Honda formally left Formula One after 2021 to focus its resources on carbon neutral technologies, but an arrangement was made for it to extend power unit supply for Red Bull until 2025. While no longer a works team, Red Bull Racing still displayed Honda on its engine cover in this extended deal. As the series introduced more sustainable regulations, Honda announced it will formally rejoin in 2026 to provide power units to Aston Martin as a works team.

Honda debuted in the CART IndyCar World Series as an engine supplier in 1994, and the company won six consecutive Drivers' Championships and four Manufacturers' Championships between 1996 and 2001. In 2003, Honda transferred its effort to the IRL IndyCar Series. In 2004, Honda won the Indianapolis 500 for the first time and claimed the Drivers' and Manufacturers' Championships, a feat which it repeated in 2005. From 2006 to 2011, Honda was the series' lone manufacturer, before manufacturer competition returned for 2012. Since 2012, Honda's turbocharged V6 engines have won the Indianapolis 500 several times as well as claimed multiple Drivers' and Manufacturers' titles. In the Japanese Super Formula Championship, Honda-powered cars have won the championship numerous times since 1981, with its title tally in the double digits. In Formula Two, Honda engines dominated the premier series in 1966 and scored multiple titles in the early 1980s.

In sports car racing, Honda won the 24 Hours of Le Mans in 1995 in the GT2 class, and in 2010 and 2012 they won in the LMP2 category. Honda made its factory debut in the Super GT Series (previously known as the All-Japan GT Championship) in 1997, and in 2000 it won its first championships. Since then, it has won several further titles, uniquely with both mid- and front-engined cars. Through their Acura and HPD divisions, Honda has also competed in sports prototype racing, beginning with the Spice-Acura prototypes that won the IMSA GT Lights championship in 1991, 1992 and 1993. Acura joined the American Le Mans Series in 2007 and won the 12 Hours of Sebring in class on their debut, before winning the championship in both the LMP1 and LMP2 classes in 2009. The cars were rebranded as HPDs for 2010, after which they won multiple titles in the ALMS and also won the FIA World Endurance Championship in the LMP2 class. Acura returned to prototype racing in 2018 in the DPi class of the IMSA SportsCar Championship, winning championship titles in 2019, 2020 and 2022 as well as the 24 Hours of Daytona overall in 2021, 2022, and 2023. Honda's GT3 car won both the IMSA GTD and Super GT GT300 titles.

During the Group A era of the Japanese Touring Car Championship, Honda won seven manufacturers' titles and six drivers' titles in the sub-1,600 cc division between 1986 and 1993. The following Super Touring era of touring car racing saw Honda win the Japanese and North American championships in 1996 and 1997, while in Europe Honda's Super Touring cars claimed over 40 wins across the British, German and European series. After the collapse of the Super Touring regulations in the early 2000s, Honda remained involved in the British Touring Car Championship, where its cars would win multiple championships in the mid-2000s and throughout the 2010s. Honda entered the World Touring Car Championship in late 2012, and in 2013 it won the Manufacturers' World Championship. Honda's TCR car won the global TCR Model of the Year award in 2019, 2020, and 2024.

=== Motorcycles ===
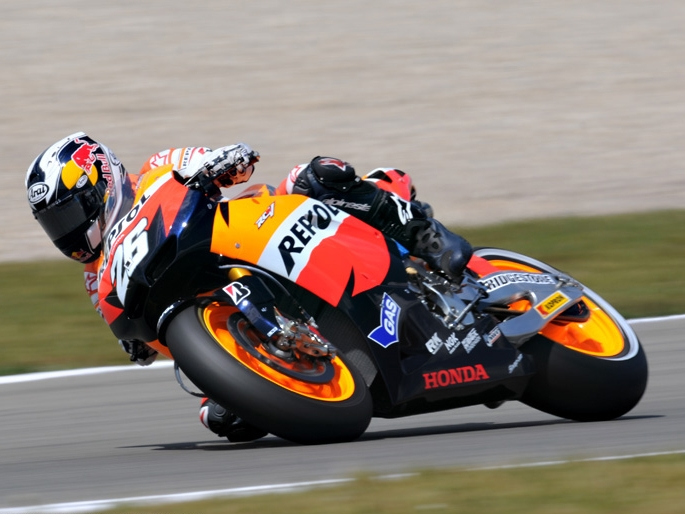
Honda RC212V raced by Dani Pedrosa

HRC combines participation in motorcycle races throughout the world with the development of high-potential racing machines. Its racing activities are an important source for the creation of leading-edge technologies used in the development of Honda motorcycles. HRC also contributes to the advancement of motorcycle sports through a range of activities that include sales of production racing motorcycles, support for satellite teams, and rider education programs.

Soichiro Honda, being a race driver himself, could not stay out of international motorsport. In 1959, Honda entered five motorcycles into the Isle of Man TT race, the most prestigious motorcycle race in the world. While always having powerful engines, it took until 1961 for Honda to tune its chassis well enough to allow Mike Hailwood to claim its first Grand Prix victories in the 125 and 250 cc classes. Hailwood would later pick up its first Senior TT wins in 1966 and 1967. Honda's race bikes were known for their "sleek & stylish design" and exotic engine configurations, such as the 5-cylinder, 22,000 rpm, 125 cc bike and their 6-cylinder 250 cc and 297 cc bikes.

In 1979, Honda returned to Grand Prix motorcycle racing with the monocoque-framed, four-stroke NR500. The FIM rules limited engines to four cylinders, so the NR500 had non-circular, 'race-track', cylinders, each with 8 valves and two connecting rods, in order to provide sufficient valve area to compete with the dominant two-stroke racers. The experiment failed. For the 1982 season, Honda debuted its first two-stroke race bike, the NS500 and in 1983, Honda won its first 500 cc Grand Prix World Championship with Freddie Spencer. Since then, Honda has become a dominant marque in motorcycle Grand Prix racing, winning a plethora of top-level titles with riders such as Mick Doohan and Valentino Rossi. Honda also head the number of wins at the Isle of Man TT having notched up 227 victories in the solo classes and Sidecar TT, including Ian Hutchinson's clean sweep at the 2010 races.

The outright lap record on the Snaefell Mountain Course was held by Honda, set at the 2015 TT by John McGuinness at an average speed of 132.701 mph (213.562 km/h) on a Honda CBR1000RR, bettered the next year by Michael Dunlop on a BMW S1000RR at 133.962 mph (215.591 km/h).

In the Motocross World Championship, Honda has claimed seventeen world championships. In the World Enduro Championship, Honda has captured eight titles, most recently with Stefan Merriman in 2003 and with Mika Ahola from 2007 to 2010. In motorcycle trials, Honda has claimed three world championships with Belgian rider Eddy Lejeune.

== Electric and alternative fuel vehicles ==
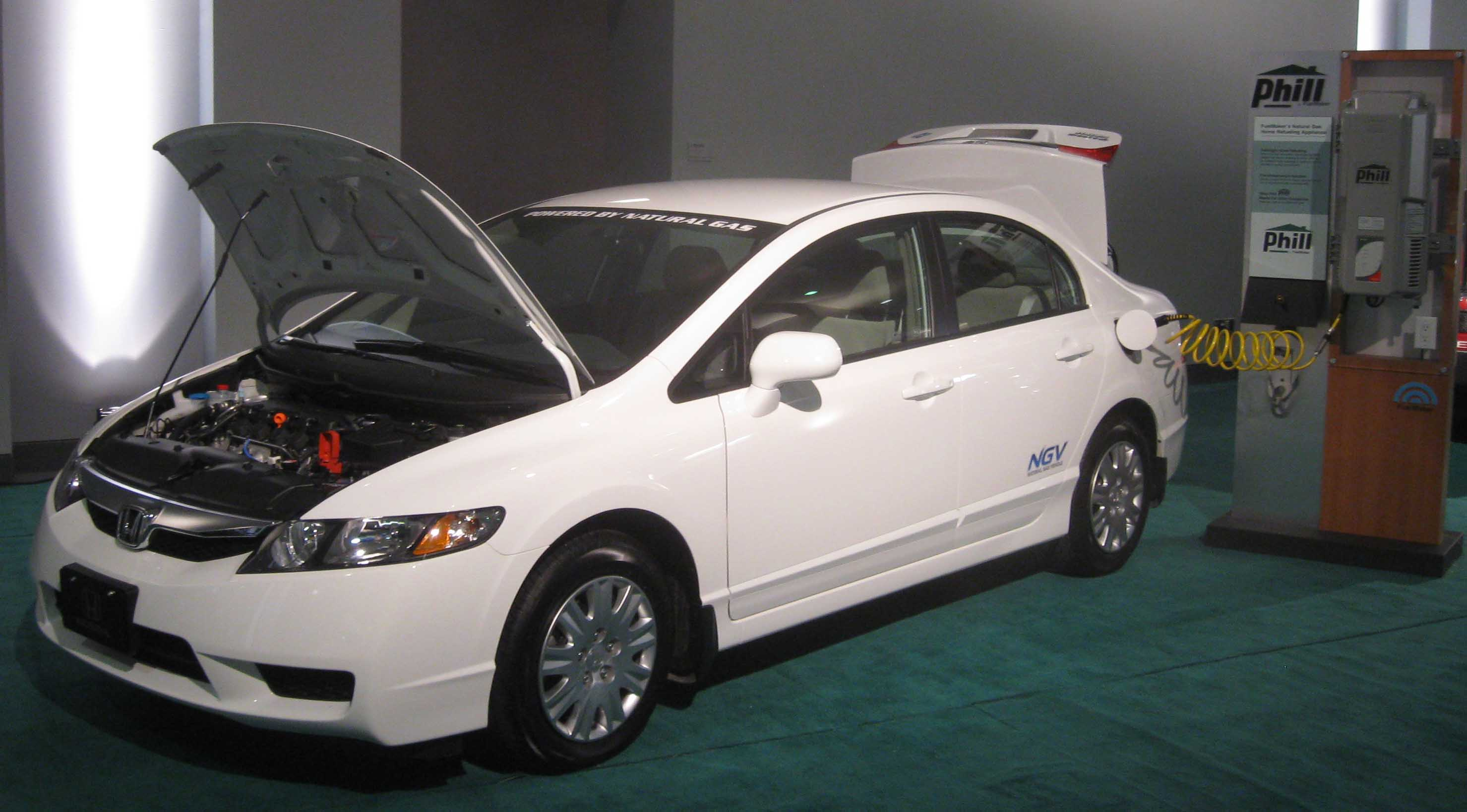
2009 Honda Civic GX hooked up to Phill refueling system

=== Compressed natural gas ===
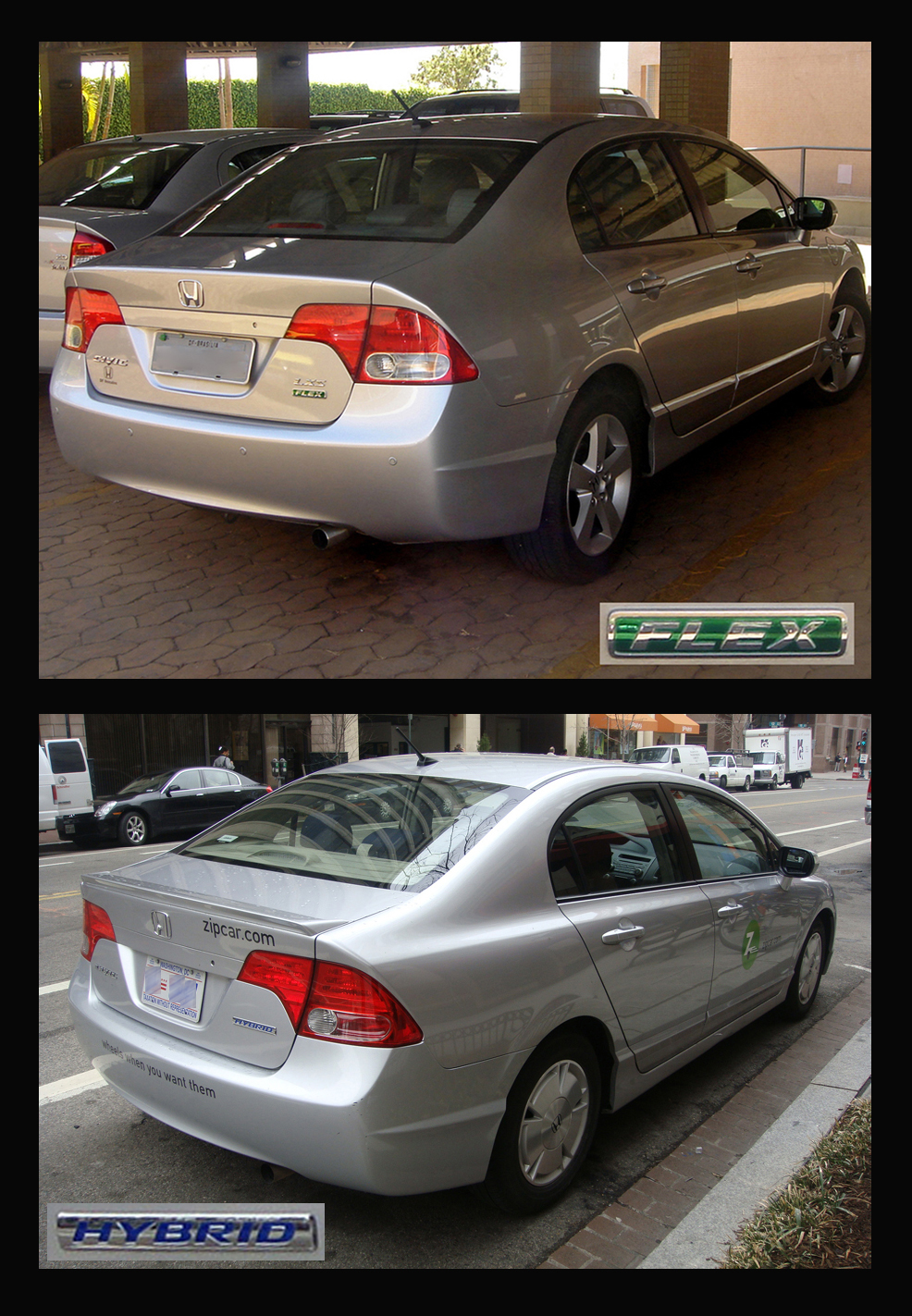
Two clean vehicle versions of the Honda Civic. Top: a Brazilian flexible-fuel vehicle. Bottom: a US gasoline-electric hybrid.

The Honda Civic GX was for a long time the only purpose-built natural gas vehicle (NGV) commercially available in some parts of the US. The Honda Civic GX first appeared in 1998 as a factory-modified Civic LX that had been designed to run exclusively on compressed natural gas. The car looks and drives just like a contemporary Honda Civic LX, but does not run on gasoline. In 2001, the Civic GX was rated the cleanest-burning internal combustion engine in the world by the US Environmental Protection Agency (EPA).

First leased to the City of Los Angeles, in 2005, Honda started offering the GX directly to the public through factory trained dealers certified to service the GX. Before that, only fleets were eligible to purchase a new Civic GX. In 2006, the Civic GX was released in New York, making it the second state where the consumer is able to buy the car.

In June 2015, Honda announced its decision to phase out the commercialization of natural-gas powered vehicles to focus on the development of a new generation of electric vehicles such as hybrids, plug-in electric cars and hydrogen-powered fuel cell vehicles. Since 2008, Honda has sold about 16,000 natural-gas vehicles, mainly to taxi and commercial fleets.

=== Flexible-fuel ===
Honda's Brazilian subsidiary launched flexible-fuel versions for the Honda Civic and Honda Fit in late 2006. As other Brazilian flex-fuel vehicles, these models run on any blend of hydrous ethanol (E100) and E20-E25 gasoline. Initially, and in order to test the market preferences, the carmaker decided to produce a limited share of the vehicles with flex-fuel engines, 33 percent of the Civic production and 28 percent of the Fit models. Also, the sale price for the flex-fuel version was higher than the respective gasoline versions, around US$1,000 premium for the Civic, and US$650 for the Fit, despite the fact that all other flex-fuel vehicles sold in Brazil had the same tag price as their gasoline versions. In July 2009, Honda launched in the Brazilian market its third flexible-fuel car, the Honda City.

During the last two months of 2006, both flex-fuel models sold 2,427 cars against 8,546 gasoline-powered automobiles, jumping to 41,990 flex-fuel cars in 2007, and reaching 93,361 in 2008. Due to the success of the flex versions, by early 2009 a hundred percent of Honda's automobile production for the Brazilian market is now flexible-fuel, and only a small percentage of gasoline version is produced in Brazil for exports.

In March 2009, Honda introduced the world's first flex-fuel motorcycle in the Brazilian market. Manufactured by its Brazilian subsidiary, Moto Honda da Amazônia, the CG 150 Titan Mix is priced at approximately US$2,700.

=== Hybrid electric ===
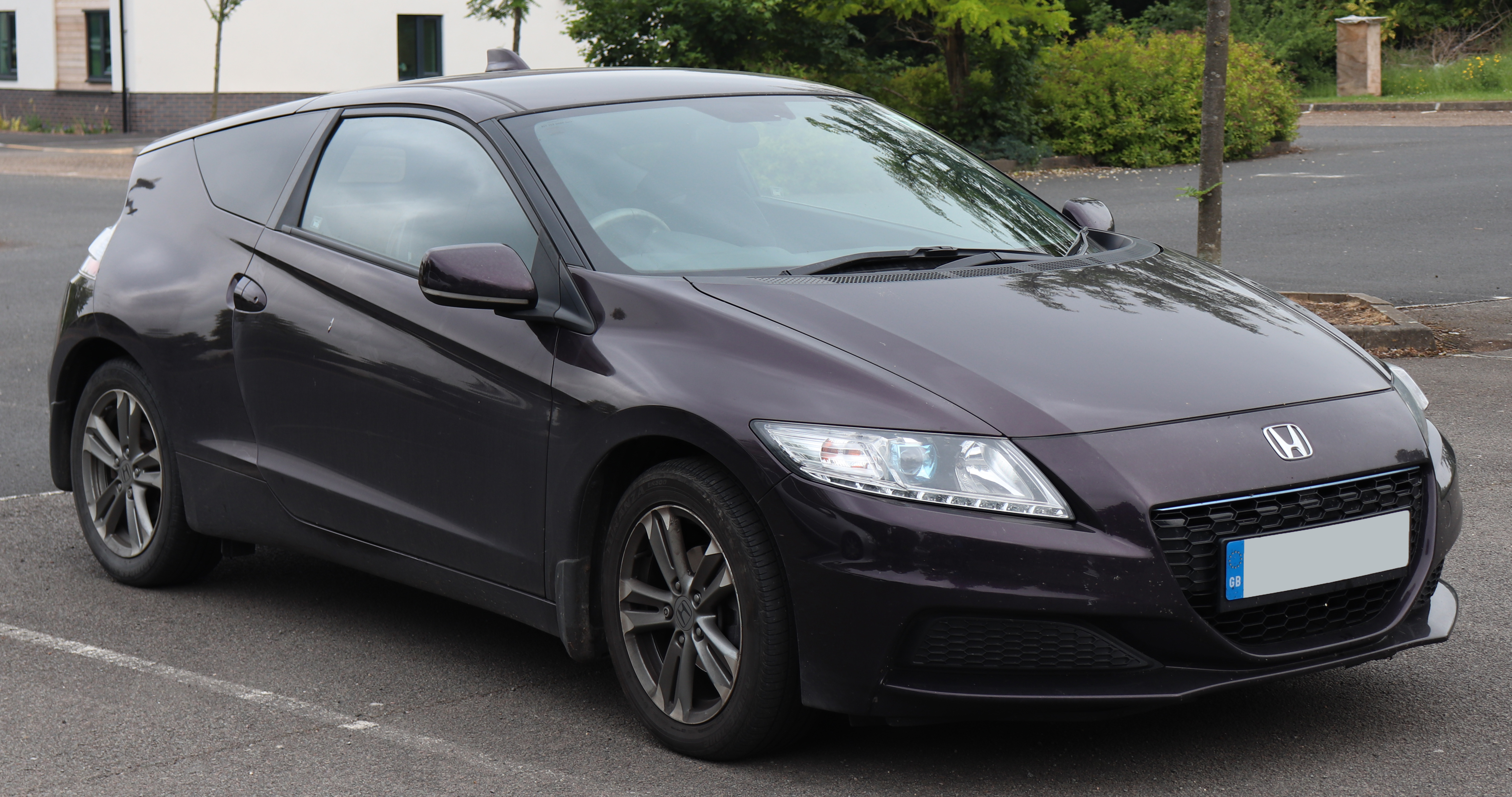
Honda CR-Z, the first sports coupe hybrid to come with a six-speed manual transmission

In late 1999, Honda launched the first commercial hybrid electric car sold in the US market, the Honda Insight, just one month before the introduction of the Toyota Prius, and initially sold for US$20,000. The first-generation Insight was produced from 2000 to 2006 and had a fuel economy of 70 miles per US gallon (3.4 L/100 km; 84 mpg_{‑imp}) for the EPA's highway rating, the most fuel-efficient mass-produced car at the time. Total global sales for the Insight amounted to only around 18,000 vehicles. Cumulative global sales reached 100,000 hybrids in 2005 and 200,000 in 2007.

Honda introduced the second-generation Insight in Japan in February 2009, and released it in other markets through 2009 and in the US market in April 2009. At $19,800 as a five-door hatchback it will be the least expensive hybrid available in the US.

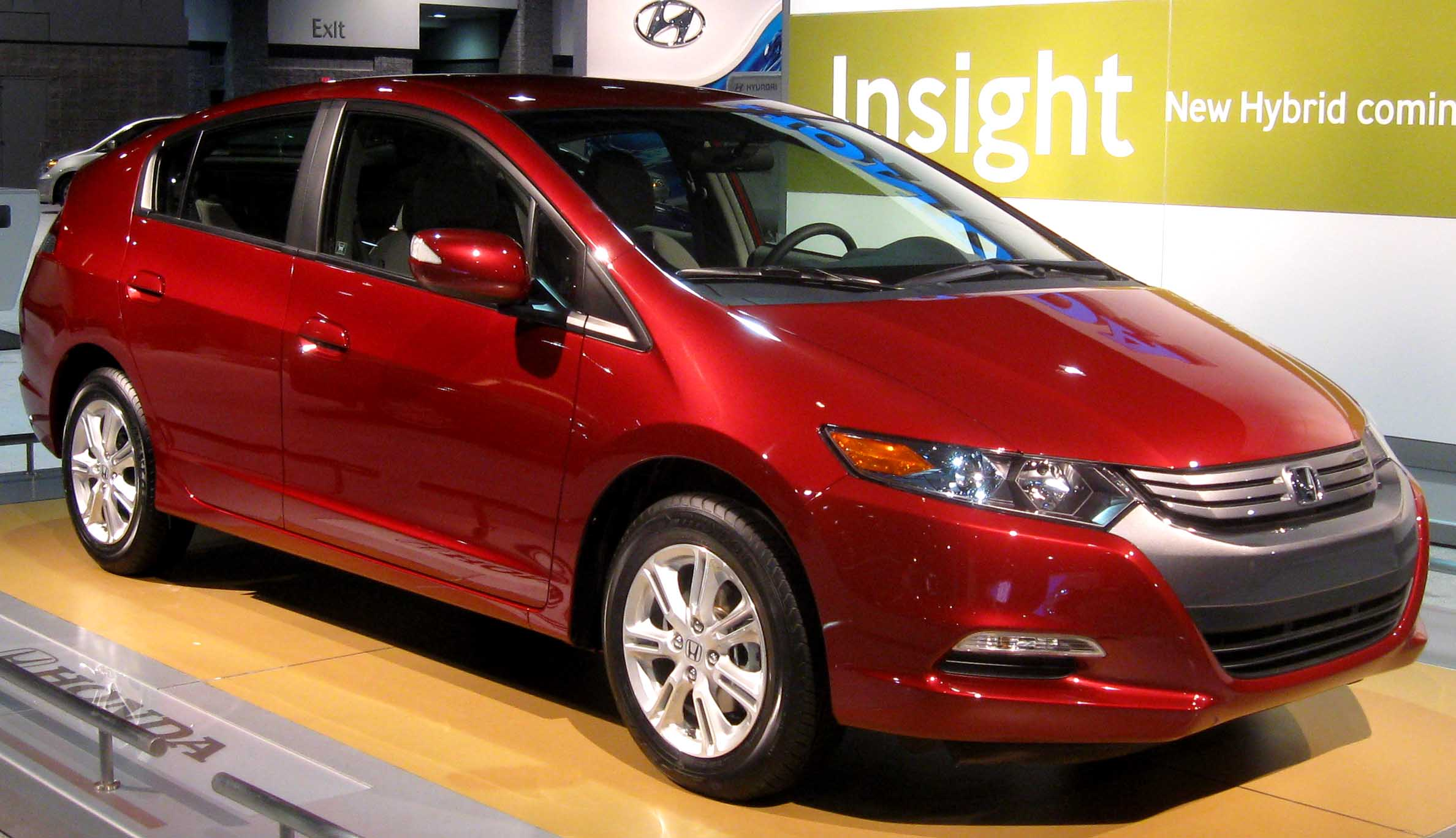
2010 Honda Insight hybrid electric vehicle (second generation)

Since 2002, Honda has also been selling the Honda Civic Hybrid (2003 model) in the US market. It was followed by the Honda Accord Hybrid, offered in model years 2005 through 2007. Sales of the Honda CR-Z began in Japan in February 2010, becoming Honda's third hybrid electric car in the market. As of February 2011, Honda was producing around 200,000 hybrids a year in Japan.

Sales of the Fit Hybrid began in Japan in October 2010, at the time, the lowest price for a gasoline-hybrid electric vehicle sold in the country. The European version, called Honda Jazz Hybrid, was released in early 2011. During 2011 Honda launched three hybrid models available only in Japan, the Fit Shuttle Hybrid, Freed Hybrid and Freed Spike Hybrid.

Honda's cumulative global hybrid sales passed the 1 million unit milestone at the end of September 2012, 12 years and 11 months after sales of the first generation Insight began in Japan November 1999. A total of 187,851 hybrids were sold worldwide in 2013, and 158,696 hybrids during the first six months of 2014. As of June 2014, Honda has sold more than 1.35 million hybrids worldwide.

=== Hydrogen fuel cell ===
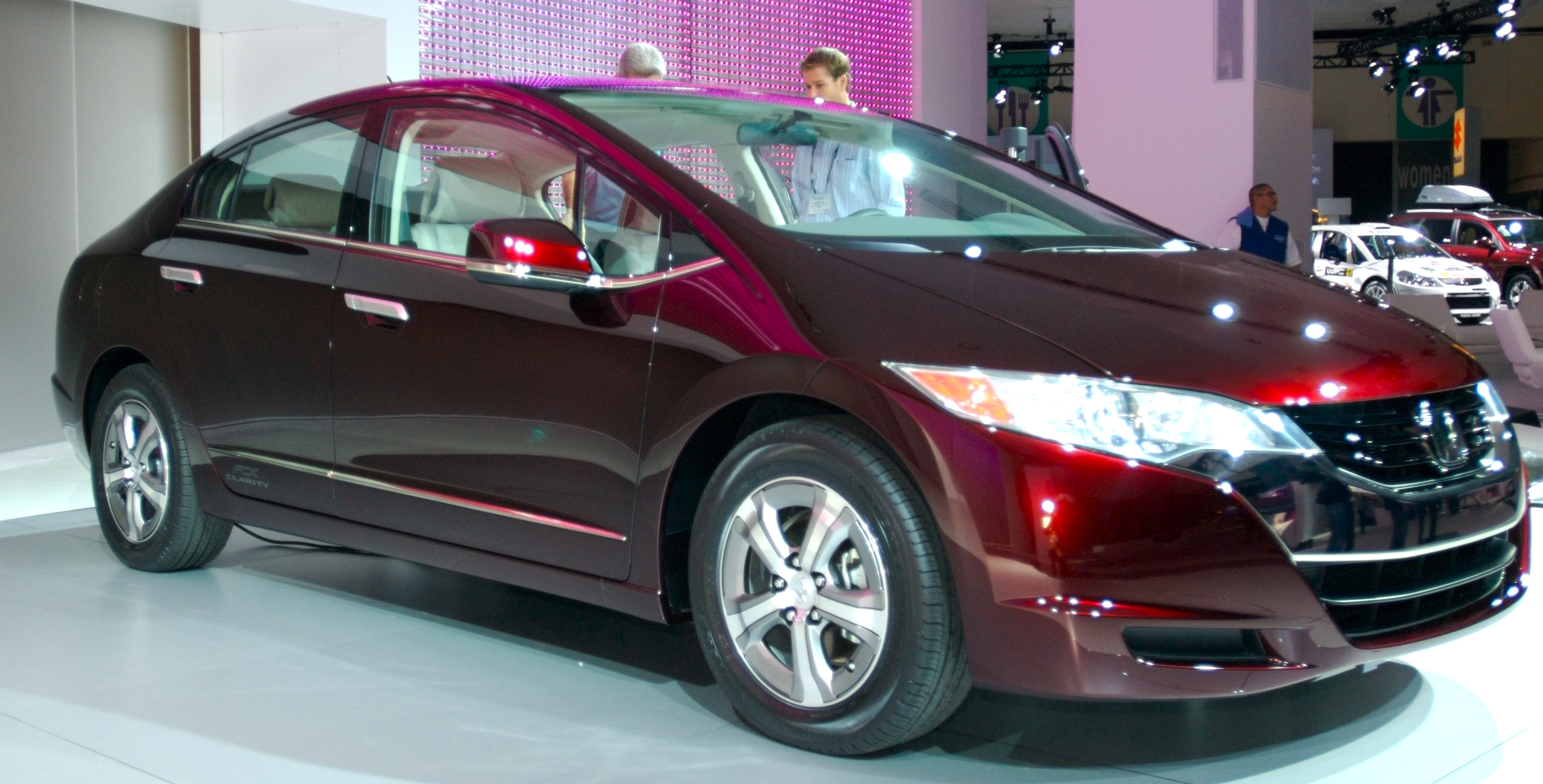
Honda FCX Clarity hydrogen fuel cell vehicle

In Takanezawa, Japan, on 16 June 2008, Honda Motors produced the first assembly-line FCX Clarity, a hybrid hydrogen fuel cell vehicle. More efficient than a gas-electric hybrid vehicle, the FCX Clarity combines hydrogen and oxygen from ordinary air to generate electricity for an electric motor. In July 2014 Honda announced the end of production of the Honda FCX Clarity for the 2015 model. The vehicle itself does not emit any pollutants and its only by-products are heat and water. The FCX Clarity also has an advantage over gas-electric hybrids in that it does not use an internal combustion engine to propel itself. Like a gas-electric hybrid, it uses a lithium ion battery to assist the fuel cell during acceleration and capture energy through regenerative braking, thus improving fuel efficiency. The lack of hydrogen filling stations throughout developed countries will keep production volumes low. Honda will release the vehicle in groups of 150. California is the only US market with infrastructure for fueling such a vehicle, though the number of stations is still limited. Building more stations is expensive, as the California Air Resources Board (CARB) granted $6.8 million for four H2 fueling stations, costing US$1.7 million each. Honda views hydrogen fuel cell vehicles as the long-term replacement of piston cars, not battery cars.

Honda introduced the CR-V e:FCEV in February 2024 in the US. It is a plug-in hybrid fuel cell version of the CR-V that is equipped with an electric motor, two high-pressure hydrogen tanks with a total capacity of 4.3 kg (9.5 lb) and a 17.7 kWh battery with plug-in charging capability. It was also launched in Japan as the only version of the CR-V sold in the country, imported from the Marysville, Ohio assembly plant in the US. This model began production on 5 June 2024. The later revealed to includes an H2 credit.

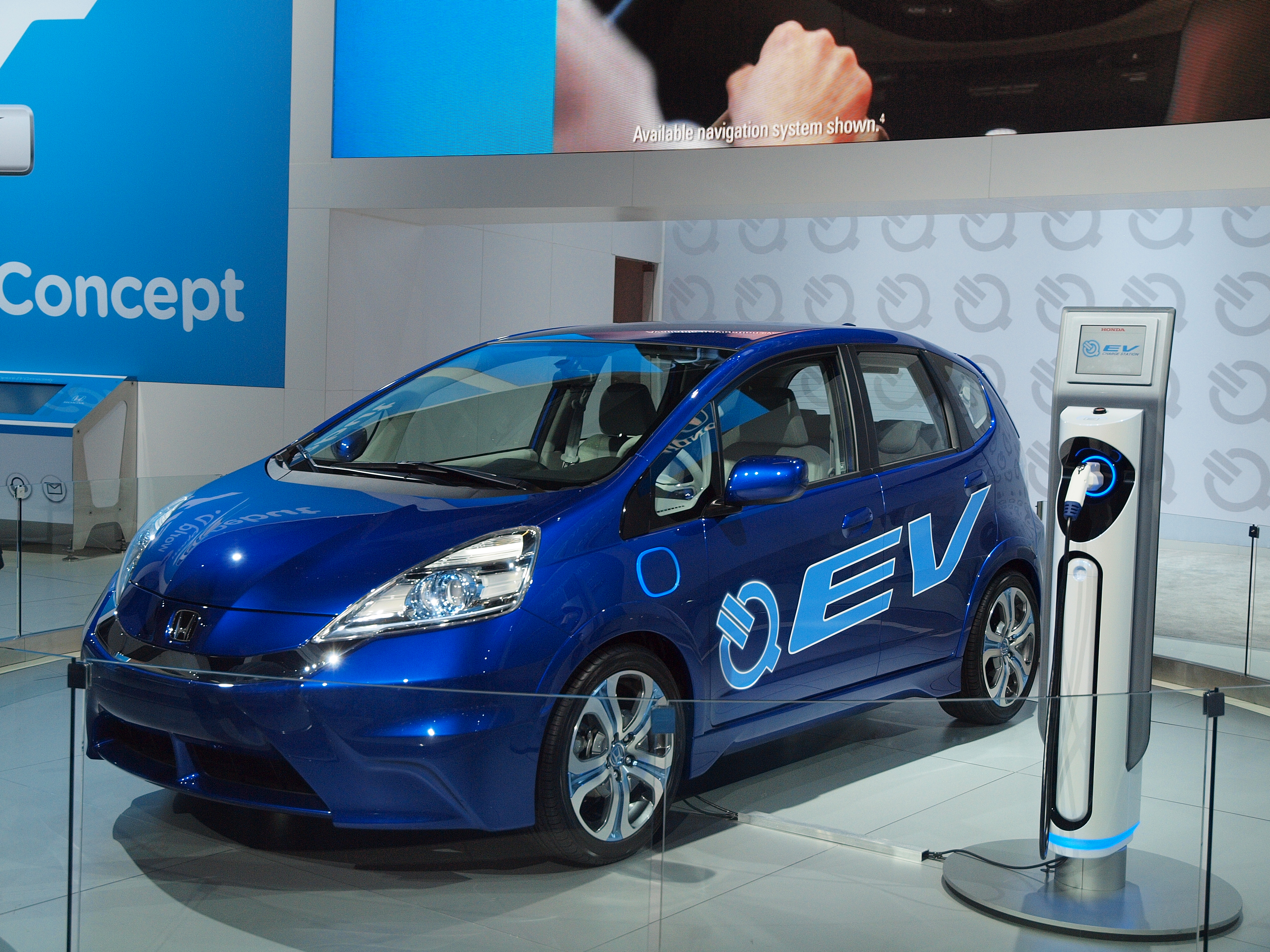
Honda Fit EV concept unveiled at the 2010 Los Angeles Auto Show

=== Plug-in electric vehicles ===
The all-electric Honda EV Plus was introduced in 1997 as a result of CARB's zero-emissions vehicle mandate and was available only for leasing in California. The EV plus was the first battery electric vehicle from a major automaker with non-lead–acid batteries The EV Plus had an all-electric range of 100 mi (160 km). Around 276 units were sold in the US and production ended in 1999. The all-electric Honda Fit EV was introduced in 2012 and has a range of 82 mi (132 km). The all-electric car was launched in the US to retail customers in July 2012 with initial availability limited to California and Oregon. Production is limited to only 1,100 units over the first three years. A total of 1,007 units have been leased in the US through September 2014. The Fit EV was released in Japan through leasing to local government and corporate customers in August 2012. Availability in the Japanese market is limited to 200 units during its first two years. In July 2014 Honda announced the end of production of the Fit EV for the 2015 model. The Honda Accord Plug-in Hybrid was introduced in 2013 and has an all-electric range of 13 mi (21 km) Sales began in the US in January 2013 and the plug-in hybrid is available only in California and New York. A total of 835 units have been sold in the US through September 2014. The Accord PHEV was introduced in Japan in June 2013 and is available only for leasing, primarily to corporations and government agencies. The Honda e was launched in 2020 and has an electric range of 137 mi (220 km). It is an electric supermini that is retro styled, similar to the first-generation Honda Civic. Following this, the Honda e:Ny1 was launched in 2023, with an electric range of 256 mi (412 km) on the top spec model. It is Honda's first electric SUV. In April 2022, Honda and General Motors announced a joint venture to develop low-cost electric vehicles based on GM's Ultium architecture in order to beat Tesla vehicles in sales.

In October 2023, the two companies announced that the joint venture has been cancelled due to slower-than-expected demand of electric vehicles and changing market conditions. Although the upcoming Honda Prologue and Acura ZDX will use the Ultium architecture and will be manufactured by General Motors, future Honda electric vehicles will be designed solely by Honda and will be manufactured in Honda assembly plants.

=== Batteries ===
In August 2022, Honda and LG Energy Solution revealed a joint venture (L-H Battery Co.) to establish a new lithium-ion battery factory in the United States, specifically for Honda and Acura electric vehicles. The initial goal was to produce 40 gigawatt hours of battery capacity. In December 2025, LGES sold its ownership of the building to Honda amidst shifting market demands. Following the cancellation of the Acura RSX and Honda 0 Series, L-H Battery began producing cells for LGES JF2 DC-LINK energy storage systems (BESS) in July 2026. Some of the remaining capacity for EV batteries will be reallocated for Honda’s new generation of hybrid models.

=== EV write downs ===
In March 2026, Honda announced it expected to realize up to $15.7B in expenses and losses related to its reassessment of its EV strategy. The company announced it decided to cancel the launches and development of certain models due to a slowdown in the North American EV market and increased competition in China.

== Marketing ==
=== Sales channels in Japan ===
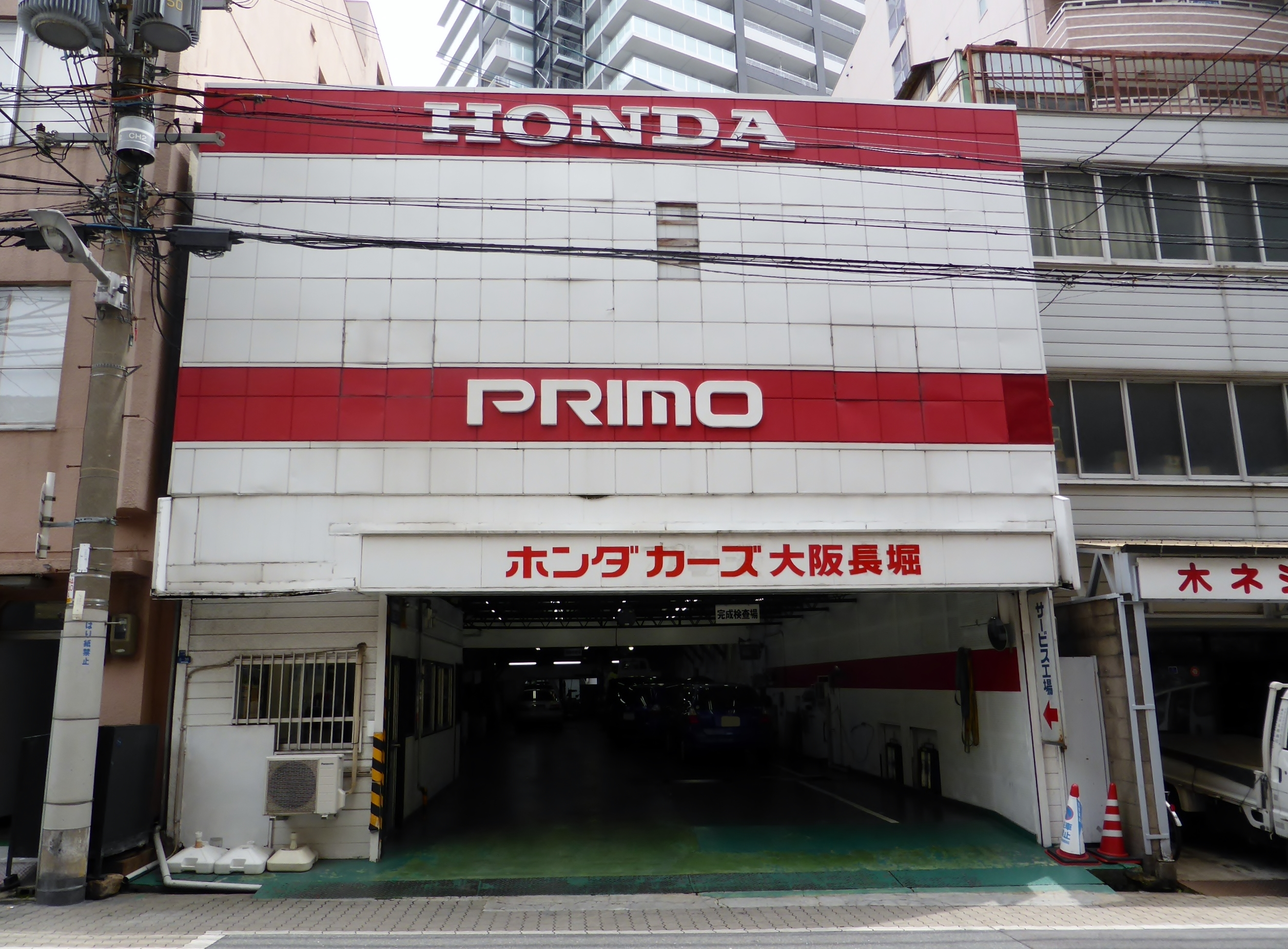
Honda Primo (Osaka)

From 1978 to 2006, Honda sold vehicles in Japan through three separate dealership networks, which are Verno, Clio, and Primo. Each offered a distinct range of models, mirroring a similar strategy used by rivals Toyota and Nissan. Honda Verno, established alongside the Honda Prelude, sold sportier and better-equipped vehicles; Honda Clio carried models such as the Honda Accord; and Honda Primo sold smaller cars including the Honda Civic and kei cars. The three networks were consolidated into a single Honda Cars brand in March 2006.

=== International marketing ===
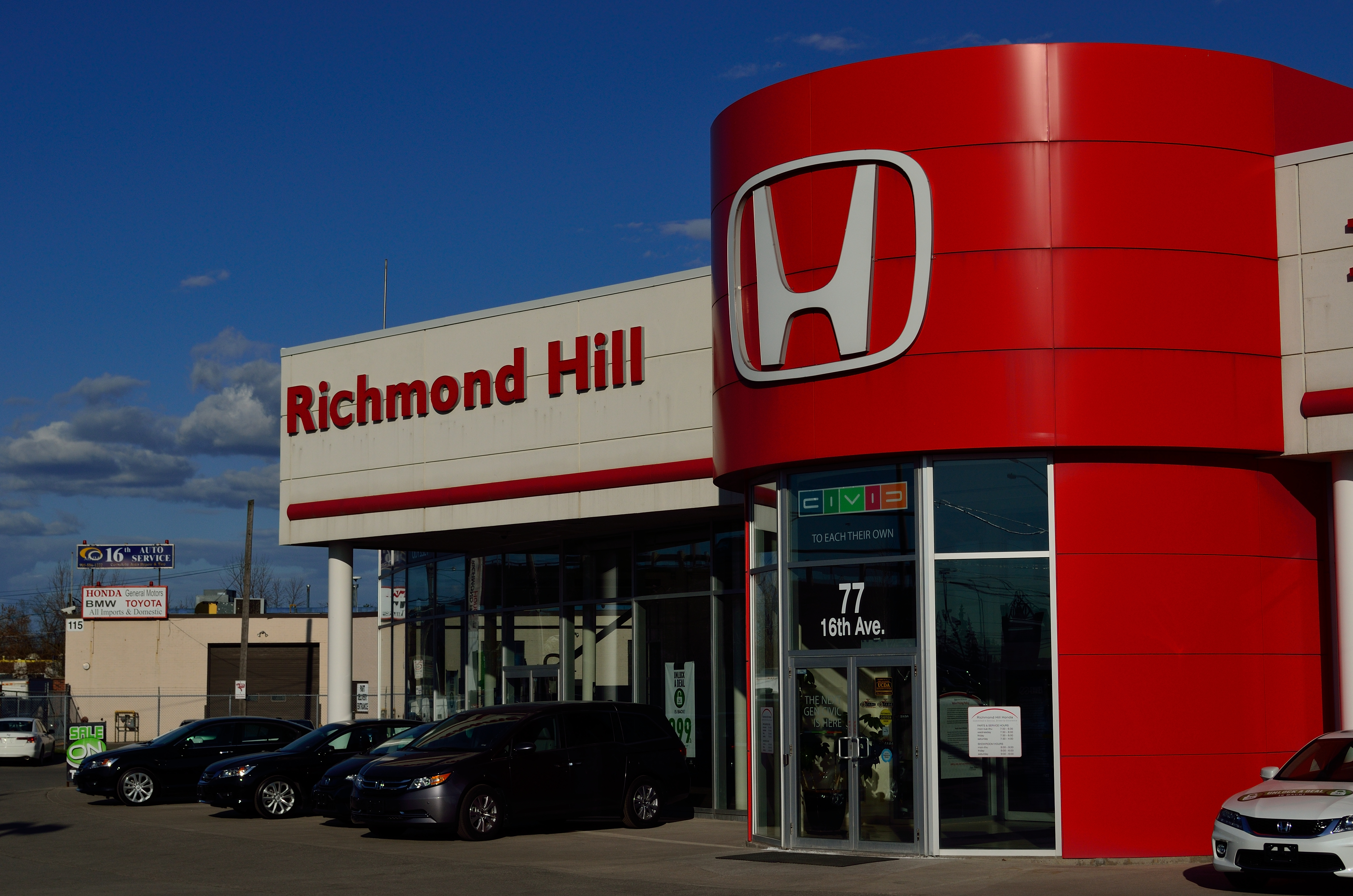
A Honda dealership in Ontario, Canada

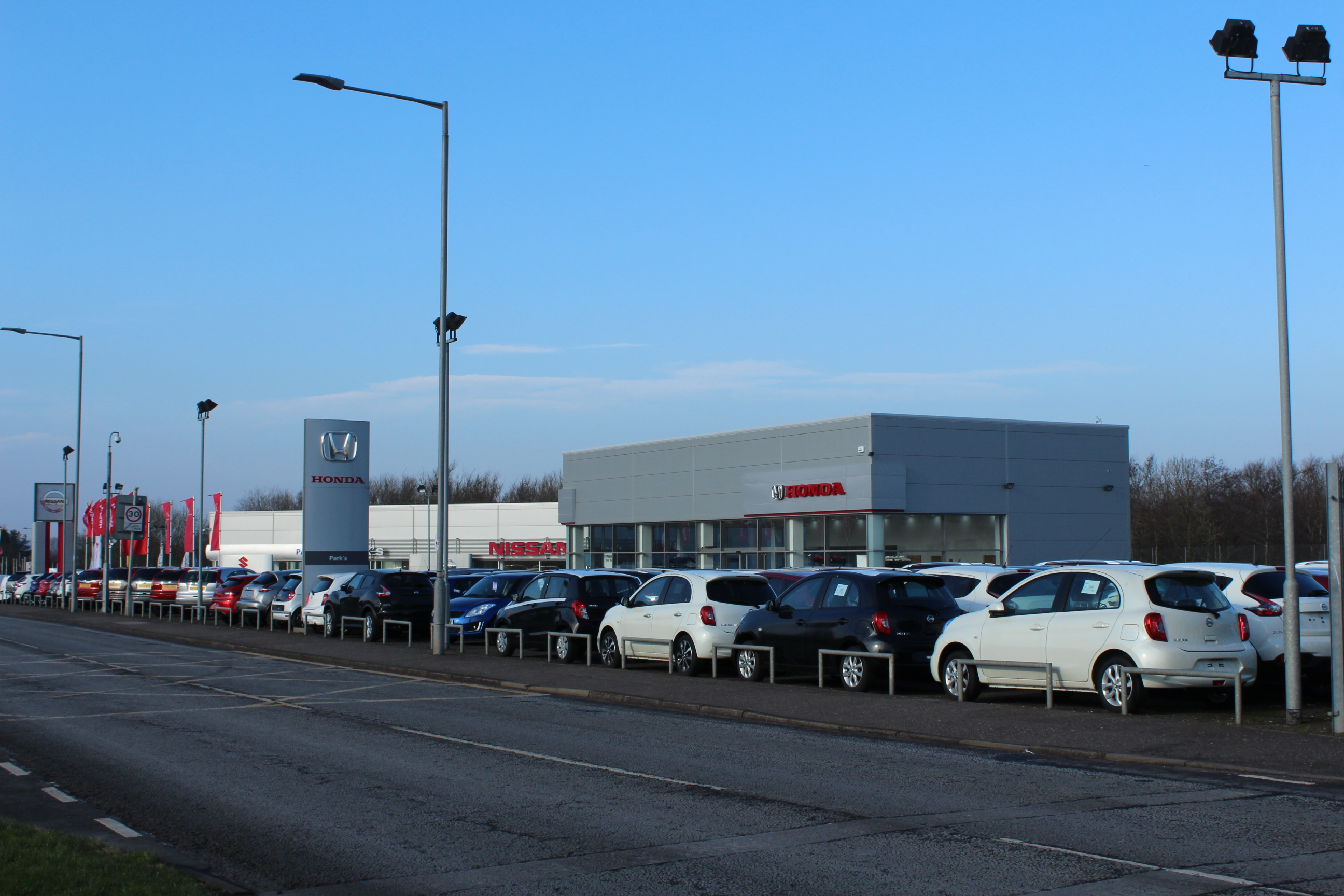
A Honda dealership in Dreghorn, Scotland

In 2003, Honda released its Cog advertisement in the UK and on the Internet. To make the ad, the engineers at Honda constructed a Rube Goldberg Machine made entirely out of car parts from a Honda Accord Touring. To the chagrin of the engineers at Honda, all the parts were taken from two of only six hand-assembled pre-production models of the Accord. The advertisement depicted a single cog which sets off a chain of events that ends with the Honda Accord moving and Garrison Keillor speaking the tagline, "Isn't it nice when things just... work?" It took 100 takes to create the ad.

Honda has done humor marketing such as its 1985 four-page "How to fit six Hondas in a two-car garage" print ad or "descending so low in a parking garage, they pass stalagmites and a Gollum-like figure."

In 2004, it produced the Grrr advert, usually immediately followed by a shortened version of the 2005 Impossible Dream advert. In December 2005, Honda released The Impossible Dream a two-minute panoramic advertisement filmed in New Zealand, Japan, and Argentina which illustrates the founder's dream to build performance vehicles. While singing the song "Impossible Dream", a man reaches for his racing helmet, leaves his trailer on a minibike, then rides a succession of vintage Honda vehicles: a motorcycle, then a car, then a powerboat, then goes over a waterfall only to reappear piloting a hot air balloon, with Garrison Keillor saying "I couldn't have put it better myself" as the song ends. The song is from the 1960s musical Man of La Mancha, sung by Andy Williams.

In 2006, Honda released its Choir advertisement, for the UK and the internet. This had a 60-person choir who sang the car noises as the film of the Honda Civic is shown.

In the mid to late 2000s in the United States, during model close-out sales for the current year before the start of the new model year, Honda's advertising has had an animated character known simply as Mr. Opportunity, voiced by Rob Paulsen. The casual-looking man talked about various deals offered by Honda and ended with the phrase "I'm Mr. Opportunity, and I'm knockin'", followed by him "knocking" on the television screen or "thumping" the speaker at the end of radio ads. In addition, commercials for Honda's international hatchback, the Jazz, are parodies of well-known pop culture images such as Tetris and Thomas the Tank Engine.

In late 2006, Honda released an ad with ASIMO exploring a museum, looking at the exhibits with almost childlike wonderment (spreading out its arms in the aerospace exhibit, waving hello to an astronaut suit that resembles him, etc.), while Garrison Keillor ruminates on progress. It concludes with the tagline: "More forwards please". Honda also sponsored ITV's coverage of Formula One in the UK for 2007. However, it had announced that it would not continue in 2008 due to the sponsorship price requested by ITV being too high.

In May 2007, focuses on its strengths in racing and the use of the Red H badge – a symbol of what is termed as "Hondamentalism". The campaign highlights the lengths that Honda engineers go to in order to get the most out of an engine, whether it is for bikes, cars, powerboats – even lawnmowers. Honda released its Hondamentalism campaign. In the TV spot, Garrison Keillor says, "An engineer once said to build something great is like swimming in honey", while Honda engineers in white suits walk and run towards a great light, battling strong winds and flying debris, holding on to anything that will keep them from being blown away. Finally one of the engineers walks towards a red light, his hand outstretched. A web address is shown for the Hondamentalism website. The digital campaign aims to show how visitors to the site share many of the Hondamentalist characteristics.

At the beginning of 2008, Honda released – the Problem Playground. The advert outlines Honda's environmental responsibility, demonstrating a hybrid engine, more efficient solar panels, and the FCX Clarity, a hydrogen-powered car. The 90-second advert has large-scale puzzles, involving Rubik's Cubes, large shapes, and a 3-dimensional puzzle. On 29 May 2008, Honda, in partnership with Channel 4, broadcast a live advertisement. It showed skydivers jumping from an airplane over Spain and forming the letters H, O, N, D, and A in mid-air. This live advertisement is generally agreed to be the first of its kind on British television. The ad lasted three minutes.

In 2009, American Honda released the Dream the Impossible documentary series, a collection of 5- to 8-minute web vignettes that focus on the core philosophies of Honda. Current short films include Failure: The Secret to Success, Kick Out the Ladder and Mobility 2088. They have Honda employees as well as Danica Patrick, Christopher Guest, Ben Bova, Chee Pearlman, Joe Johnston and Orson Scott Card. The film series plays at dreams.honda.com. In the UK, national television ads feature voice-overs from American radio host Garrison Keillor, while in the US the voice of Honda commercials is actor and wrestler John Cena. In the North American market, Honda starts all of its commercials with a two-tone jingle since the mid-2010s.

=== Sports ===
Ayrton Senna, the late F1 driver, once remarked that Honda played a pivotal role in his three world championships. He held deep respect for the company's founder, Soichiro Honda, and maintained a strong relationship with Nobuhiko Kawamoto, the chairman of Honda at the time. Senna even referred to Honda as "the greatest company in the world."

As part of its marketing campaign, Honda is an official partner and sponsor of the North American National Hockey League, the Anaheim Ducks of the NHL, and the arena named after it: Honda Center. Honda also sponsored The Honda Classic golf tournament in the United States until 2023 and is a sponsor of the United States Major League Soccer. The "Honda Player of the Year" award is presented in United States soccer. The "Honda Sports Award" is given to the best female athlete in each of twelve college sports in the United States. One of the twelve Honda Sports Award winners is chosen to receive the Honda-Broderick Cup, as "Collegiate Woman Athlete of the Year".

Honda sponsored La Liga club Valencia CF starting from 2014–15 season. Honda has been a presenting sponsor of the Los Angeles Marathon since 2010 in a three-year sponsorship deal, with winners of the LA Marathon receiving a free Honda Accord. Since 1989, the Honda Campus All-Star Challenge has been a quiz bowl tournament for Historically black colleges and universities.

== Sales ==
Calendar year	Total US sales
1992	768,845
1993	716,546
1994	788,230
1995	794,579
1996	843,928
1997	940,386
1998	1,009,600
1999	1,076,893
2000	1,158,860
2001	1,207,639
2002	1,247,834
2003	1,349,847
2004	1,394,398
2005	1,462,472
2006	1,509,358
2007	1,551,542
2008	1,284,261
2009	1,150,784
2010	1,230,480
2011	1,147,000
2012	1,422,000
2013	1,525,312
2014	1,540,872
2015	1,586,551
2016	1,637,942
2017	1,641,429
2018	1,604,828
2019	1,608,170

== Production numbers ==
For automobiles:

Calendar year	Global production
2009	3,012,000
2010	3,643,000
2011	2,909,000
2012	4,110,000
2013	4,112,000
2014	4,513,769
2015	4,543,838
2016	4,999,266
2017	5,236,842
2018	5,357,013

== See also ==
- Comparison of Honda water-pumps
- Honda advanced technology
- Honda Airport
- Honda Battle of the Bands
- Honda G-Con
- Honda F.C., football (soccer) club
- Honda Heat, rugby union club
- Honda in motorsport
- Honda Racing Corporation USA
- Honda Type R
- List of Honda assembly plants
- List of Honda transmissions
- List of motor scooter manufacturers and brands
- List of automotive manufacturers by production

== Sources ==
- "Move Over, Volvo: Honda Sets New Safety Standard for Itself". Motor Trend. March 2004. p. 32.
- "Annual Reports". Investor Relations. Honda Motor Co.
- Sanders, Terry. The Japan Project: Made in Japan.
- Aritake, Toshio (December 2005). "Honda's Midlife Crisis". Chief Executive. Archived from the original on 10 July 2006.
- "Our history". Honda.
