= Honda G-Con =

Honda's internal safety standard

G-Con is Honda Motor Co.'s internal passive safety standard. G-Con is short for G-Force Control. The standards incorporated into G-Con are constantly updated to benchmark against many of the world's toughest crash safety regulations as well as against data collected from real-world accident cases. The objective of G-Con is to control the impact energy (G-force) of a collision and reduce injuries to the vehicle occupants.

== Background ==
G-Con was first announced in 1998, and all Honda vehicles developed from a new platform since then are designed with G-Con technology. G-CON is part of the wider concept of Honda advanced technology.

== Test Standards ==
The G-Con test includes:

1. 55 km/h full frontal collision
2. 64 km/h frontal offset collision
3. 55 km/h side collision
4. 50 km/h rear collision

The scope of G-Con's test covers a wider range than many country's legal requirements. For example, the U.S. NHTSA test only covers full frontal collision but does not test vehicles against an offset deformable frontal barrier. Frontal offset collision tests are a better representation of some real world collisions because they mimic the driver's instinctive reaction to swerve away from an obstacle to avoid an accident. Rear collision tests are not a mandatory requirement by any major automotive market. Euro NCAP have yet to incorporate rear collision though there are plans to do so in the future; however it covers side pole impact test and collisions with infant occupants.

G-Con technology focuses on passive safety aspects. In an overall vehicle safety philosophy, active safety components are more important than passive safety.

== Further developments ==
Most crash testings are done in a controlled laboratory environment, against static objects and thus many variables that affect a vehicle's real-world crash performance are not evaluated. One of the main problems with real world collisions is the huge disparity between weight, dimensions and body types of different vehicles on the road. When vehicles of different weight and size collide, the vehicle's passive safety features may not work as intended. The differences in vehicle designs may cause of the colliding vehicles to under-ride or over-ride, limiting the vehicle's frames to properly absorb / disperse the impact energy. This is particularly serious in a collision between a small hatchback and a large sedan / SUV. Even on a collision between two same vehicle models, the differences in their ride height due to the number of occupants on board / actual weight is sufficient to cause the two vehicle's crash members to be out of alignment with each other, causing under-riding / over-riding.

Recognising this, Honda built the world's first indoor car-to-car omnidirectional crash test facility in its Tochigi R&D Center in year 2000. This allows Honda to now simulate collisions between multiple vehicles of any body type, from any direction. With results from tests done from this facility, Honda was able to further build on its G-Con technology to incorporate Advance Compatibility Engineering, Honda's term for crash compatibility body.

The 2003 JDM Honda Life is the first Honda model to be developed with ACE, to incorporate a crash compatibility body. The mini kei car Honda Life is designed to withstand collision against a 2-ton Honda Legend (Acura RL) sedan. All new Honda models developed from a new platform after that are equipped with crash compatibility body.

Since then, G-Con has been further developed to also include pedestrian safety.
