= Honda Mobilityland =

Japanese racing tracks operator and hospitality company

Honda Mobilityland Corp. is a merger of two Japanese racing track facilities, known as the Suzuka Circuit and Twin Ring Motegi. Suzuka Circuit was established in 1962 and Twin Ring Motegi was established in 1997. The two facilities merged management operations on June 1, 2006, establishing a new business model. It is owned by Honda Motor Co., Ltd.

== Businesses ==
As the official promoter of the Japanese Grand Prix, Honda Mobilityland pays Formula One Management an estimated annual hosting fee to stage the event at Suzuka Circuit, under a contract extended through 2029.

- Motorsports
  - Hold and manage at Suzuka Circuit for Formula One Grand Prix and Twin Ring Motegi for Grandprix motorcycle racing, 8-hour Endurance Road Race, etc., as well as plan, hold and manage other races.
- Amusement
  - Manage amusement facilities at Suzuka Circuit, Twin Ring Motegi.
- Resort
  - Manage hotels, training halls, restaurants, hot springs and wedding halls.
- Traffic Education
  - Hold safe riding/driving and licensed motorcycle lessons.
- Planning & Development
  - Develop and design rides, plan comprehensively the leisure land.
