= Honda Vietnam =

Automobile manufacturer

Honda Vietnam Co., Ltd.
- Company type: Joint venture
- Industry: Automotive
- Founded: March 1996; 30 years ago
- Headquarters: Phúc Yên, Vietnam
- Area served: Vietnam
- Key people: Sayaka Hattori (CEO)
- Products: Automobiles; Motorcycles
- Parent: Honda (42%)
- Website: honda.com.vn

Honda Vietnam Co., Ltd., commonly known as Honda Vietnam, is a subsidiary of Honda. It is a joint venture between Honda Motor Company (42%), Vietnam Engine and Agricultural Machinery Corporation (30%) and Asian Honda Motor Company (28%).

== History ==
Honda Vietnam was established in March 1996 as a motorcycle manufacturing and sales company in Vietnam.

In 2006, Honda Vietnam began automobile manufacturing and sales with the launch of the Honda Civic.

== Facilities ==
Honda Vietnam operates three motorcycle plants with a combined production capacity of 2.5 million units annually. It also operates one automobile plant with an annual production capacity of 35,000 units.
