= Eddy Lejeune =

Belgian motorcycle racer

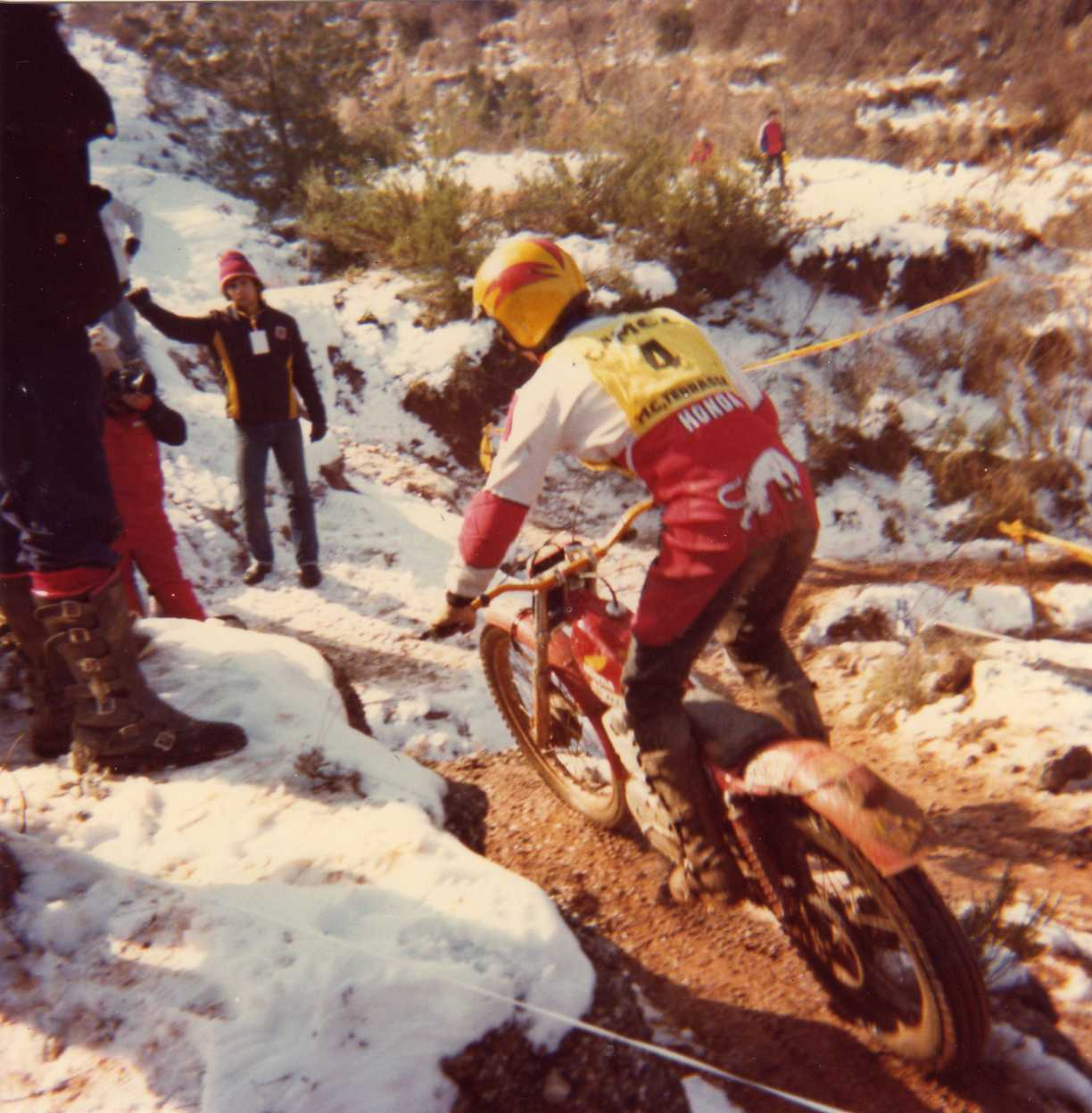
- Lejeune at the 1981 Sant Llorenç Trial.
- Nationality: (Belgium) Belgian
- Born: 4 April 1961 (age 65); Verviers, Belgium
- Current team: Retired

Eddy Lejeune (born 4 April 1961), is a Belgian former International motorcycle trials rider and 1982, 1983 and 1984 FIM Trial World Championship title holder. Lejeune was also a seven-time Belgian Trials National Champion.

== Biography ==
Born in Verviers, Belgium, Lejeune followed in the footsteps of his elder brother Jean Marie Lejeune who was Belgian Trials Champion in 1974, 1977 and 1978. He began as a schoolboy riding a Honda and after impressing at youth level was signed by the Honda Factory in 1979 at the age of 16.

In 1980, Lejeune won his first Belgian title and placed 4th in the FIM Trial World Championship, winning his first world championship trial on home ground at the Belgian round. 1981 was another Belgian title and another fourth in the World Championship for the young Belgian. Lejeune ran away with the World Championship in 1982 taking 9 wins and 2 podiums throughout the season, also retaining his Belgian title. He defended the title for Honda at both World and National level during the 1983 and 1984 seasons. 1985 was a battle for the title between Eddy and Fantic factory rider Thierry Michaud. Lejeune won the Belgian and Austrian rounds and podiumed at eight of the other ten rounds, but was beaten by Michaud and wound up the season in second place.

1987 saw another season long battle with not only Michaud but with his own Honda teammate Steve Saunders. After sharing almost all of the wins and podiums between them it all came down to the final round in Finland. Lejeune had a rough day finishing 13th with rivals Michaud and Saunders taking first and third at the trial, and first and second in the championship. 1987 didn't produce Lejeune's usual results and at the end of the season Honda decided not to renew his contract.

Ignacio Bulto, son of Bultaco founder Paco Bulto was at this time pushing his new Merlin trials bike line and was quick to sign Lejeune for the 1988 season. Lejeune finished a creditable 6th in the championship with podiums in Luxemburg and Belgium, but unfortunately Merlin folded at the end of the season. Lejeune was contracted by Montesa for the 1989 and 1990 seasons then retired at the end of 1990.

In 1998, Lejeune had a bad road accident which left him with head injuries which he still suffers with today. All three of the Lejeune brothers, Eddy, Jean Marie and Eric had a one off ride in the 2011 Scottish Six Days Trial.

== International Trials Championship Career ==
Year	Class	Machine	Rd 1	Rd 2	Rd 3	Rd 4	Rd 5	Rd 6	Rd 7	Rd 8	Rd 9	Rd 10	Rd 11	Rd 12	Points	Pos	Notes
1979	FIM World Championship	Honda	IRL -	GBR -	BEL -	NED -	SPA -	FRA -	CAN; 10	USA; 9	ITA -	SWE; 6	FIN -	CZE; 7	12	15th	
1980	FIM World Championship	Honda	IRL -	GBR; 10	BEL; 1	SPA; 8	AUT; 1	FRA; 4	SWI; 1	GER; 6	ITA; 7	FIN; 7	SWE; 3	CZE; 5	86	4th	
1981	FIM World Championship	Honda	SPA; 2	BEL; 1	IRL; 1	GBR; 6	FRA; 6	ITA; 4	AUT -	USA; 6	FIN; 7	SWE; 6	CZE; 6	GER; 5	85	4th	
1982	FIM World Championship	Honda	SPA; 1	BEL; 1	GBR; 2	ITA; 1	FRA; 2	GER; 1	AUT; 1	CAN; 3	USA; 1	FIN; 1	SWE; 1	POL; 4	162	1st	World Champion
1983	FIM World Championship	Honda	SPA; 4	BEL; 1	GBR; 1	IRL; 1	USA; 3	FRA; 5	AUT; 1	ITA; 1	SWI; 1	FIN; 1	SWE; 2	GER; 1	156	1st	World Champion
1984	FIM World Championship	Honda	SPA; 2	BEL; 1	GBR; 4	IRL; 1	FRA; 1	GER; 3	USA; 2	CAN; 1	AUT; 3	ITA; 1	FIN; 1	SWE; 2	214	1st	World Champion
1985	FIM World Championship	Honda	SPA; 3	BEL; 1	GBR; 2	IRL; 2	FRA; 6	USA; 3	AUT; 1	POL; 2	FIN; 2	SWE; 2	SWI; 2	GER; 4	195	2nd	
1986	FIM World Championship	Honda	BEL; 1	GBR; 6	IRL; 2	SPA; 1	FRA; 4	USA; 3	CAN; 1	GER; 3	AUT; 2	ITA; 1	SWE; 4	FIN; 13	183	3rd	
1987	FIM World Championship	Honda	SPA -	BEL; 6	SWE; 4	IRL; 3	GER -	FRA -	USA -	AUT; 8	ITA; 12	CZE; 8	SWI; 6	SWE; 4	81	9th	
1988	FIM World Championship	Merlin	SPA; 10	GBR; 6	IRL; 9	LUX; 3	GBR; 7	AUT -	FRA; 5	BEL; 2	ITA; 7	SWE; 12	FIN; 6	POL; 6	108	6th	
1989	FIM World Championship	Montesa	GBR; 10	IRL; 12	ITA; 7	USA; 11	CAN; 10	FRA; 9	SWI -	SPA -	AUT; 15	CZE; 10	GER; 14	LUX; 5	57	10th	
1990	FIM World Championship	Montesa	IRL -	GBR -	USA -	CAN -	BEL; 12	GER -	SWE -	FIN -	SPA -	ITA -	POL -	SWI -	4	25th	

== Honors ==
- Belgian Trials Champion 1980, 1981, 1982, 1983, 1984, 1985, 1986
- FIM Trials World Champion 1982, 1983, 1984

== Related Reading ==
- FIM Trial World Championship
