= Takahiro Hachigo =

Japanese engineer and businessman (born 1959)

- 八郷隆弘
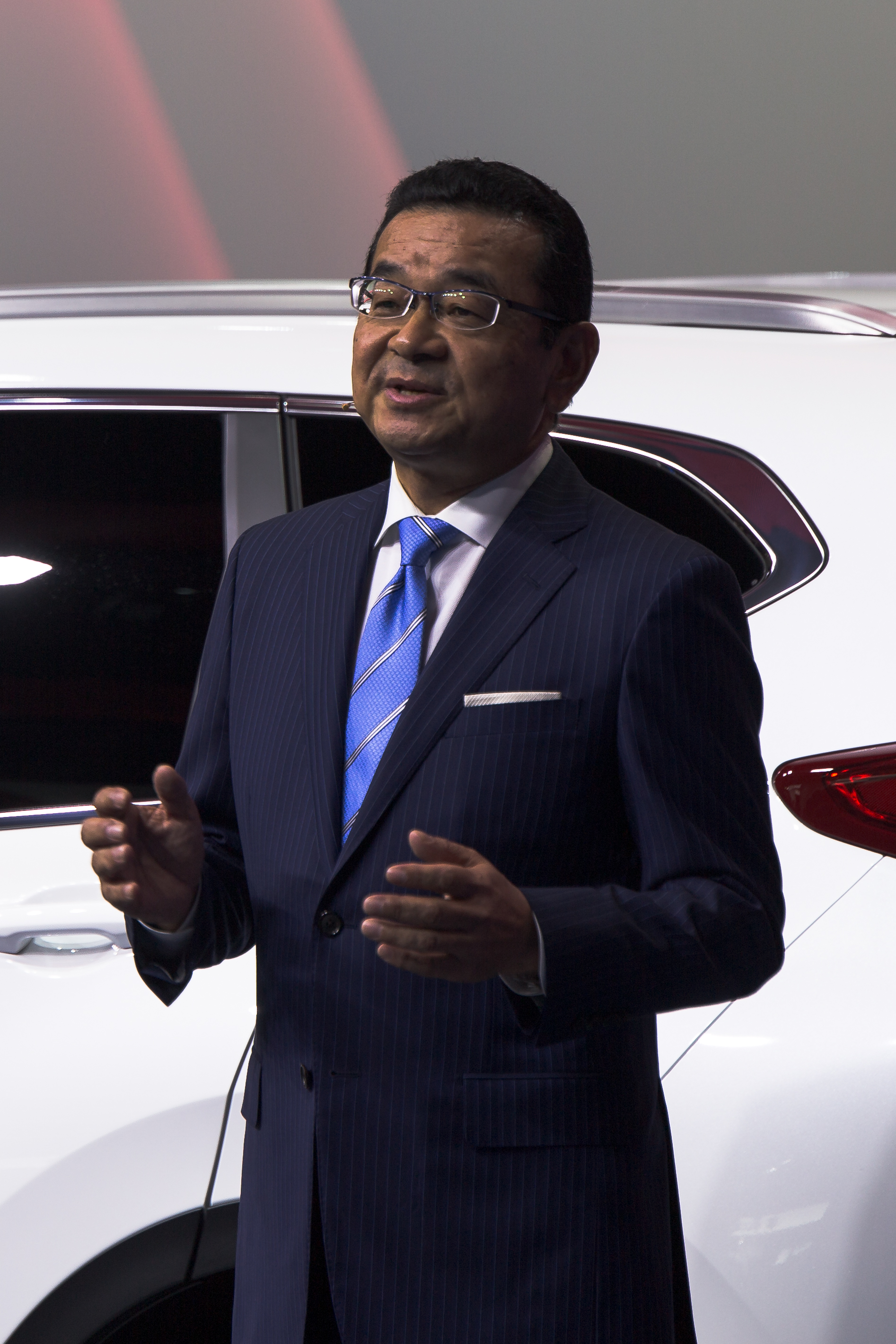
- Born: 19 May 1959 (age 67); Japan
- Education: Tokyo City University
- Occupations: President, Chief Executive Officer and Representative Director of Honda Motor Co.
- Known for: Former CEO of Honda
- Board member of: Honda

Takahiro Hachigo (八郷隆弘, Hachigō Takahiro; born 19 May 1959) is a Japanese engineer and businessman, who has been the chief executive officer of Honda Motor Co., Ltd., from June 2015 - April 2021 and was succeeded by Toshihiro Mibe. Prior to this, Hachigo was a managing officer at Honda, and started his career at Honda in 1982 as a chassis engineer. As CEO, Hachigo sought to streamline the manufacturing process by merging certain operations between motorcycles and cars, and while also lowering the costs of production by consolidating factories at home and abroad involving the budget. Hachigo is currently a member of the company board.
