= Honda pumps =

A comparison of the capacity difference between the Honda WX10 and Honda WX15

Honda pumps are portable pumps which are manufactured in Japan, India, China and the United States.

== Pump types ==
All Honda Power Equipment petrol-powered pumps utilize a Honda 4-stroke engine, while the submersible pumps use electricity to power the engine.

=== Volume ===
Volume (or transfer) pumps are designed to pump a massive amount of clean water in an economical fashion.
