= Japan Automotive Hall of Fame =

Event and NPO in Japan

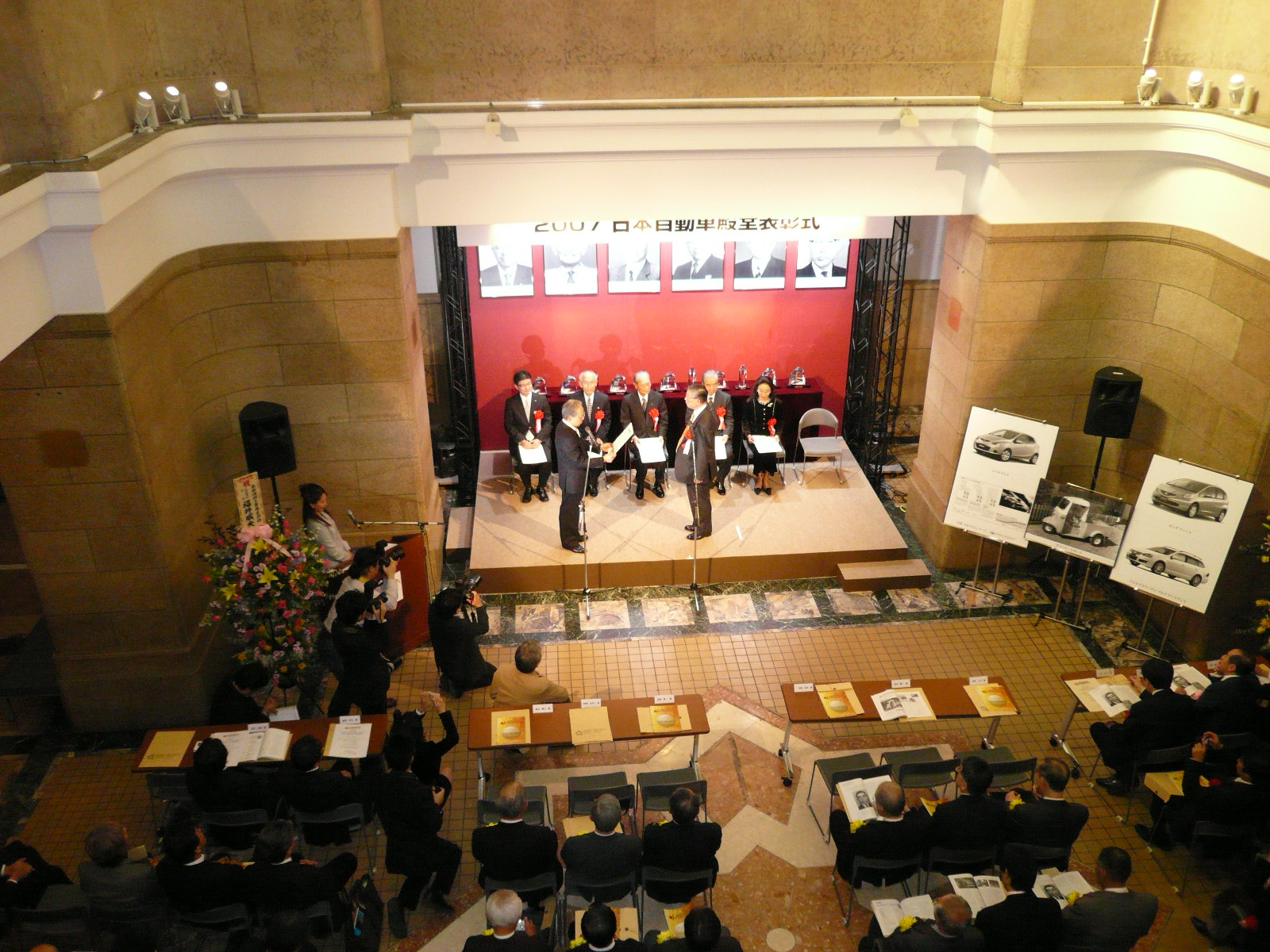
View of the 2007 JAHFA induction ceremony

The Japan Automotive Hall of Fame (JAHFA) is a non-profit organization established in 2001 to recognize individuals who have contributed to the development of Japan’s automotive industry and culture. It also designates historically significant automobiles from different periods.

JAHFA operates in Japan with the goal of preserving and teaching the achievements of automotive pioneers to future generations. Since its first induction ceremony in 2001, it has honored both individuals and vehicles for their impacts on the industry.

The organization also hosts annual award ceremonies, presenting honors such as Car of the Year, Technology of the Year, Design of the Year, and Historic Car of Japan. The 24th ceremony was held in Tokyo in 2024.

Through collaborations with institutions and museums, JAHFA promotes public awareness of automotive history through exhibitions, events, and outreach initiatives.

== Inductees ==
=== 2001 ===
- Kiichiro Toyoda: Founder of Toyota and Toyoda Machinery

Born in 1894, after completing his education from Tokyo Imperial University, Toyoda joined his family's business – the Toyoda Spinning & Weaving Co. in Aichi Prefecture. In the 1930s, he established a car-building factory, where the ‘Toyota’ brand name was first used. When Toyoda was changed to Toyota Motors, one part of the company still kept the Toyoda name (Toyoda Machinery), which produces machine tools. Toyoda died in March 1952.

- Soichiro Honda: Founder of Honda

Honda was born in November 1906. He worked at a car repair firm in Tokyo before establishing his own workshop in 1928. The Honda marque was established in October 1946, starting with motorcycles before moving into the automotive field. Honda died in August 1991.

- Takeo Fujisawa: Business Manager of Honda

Born in 1910, Fujisawa joined Honda in 1949 and looked after the business aspect of the brand. He died in December 1988.

- Jiro Yanase: Car Importer

Yanase was born in 1916 at Tokyo, joining his father's company, Yanase Co Ltd, in 1939. He secured the rights to sell multiple motor vehicles (such as Mercedes, Volkswagen, Audi, and Volvo) to the Japanese market, introducing several brands to the country. Yanase was inducted into the JAHFA in May 1995 and Automotive Hall of Fame in North America in 2004. He died in March 2008

- Osamu Hirao: Scholar/Doctor of Engineering

Born in 1915, Hirao graduated from Tokyo Imperial University in 1939. He became a professor in 1954, and at that time published over 200 theses. He became a Fellow of the Society of Automotive Engineers (SAE) in 1977 and died in July 1995, aged 80.

- Shojiro Ishibashi: Founder of Bridgestone

Born in 1889, Ishibashi came from a family of 'tabi', a traditional Japanese socks manufacturer. These evolved into working shoes with rubber soles, and the use of rubber was then expanded into several fields. He founded Bridgestone (the English translation of his family name 'Ishibashi' backwards) Tires in 1931, which became Japan's first national producer of tires for cars and trucks. Ishibashi died in September 1976.

=== 2002 ===
- Osamu Suzuki: President of Suzuki

Born in 1930, Osamu Suzuki was appointed president of Suzuki in 1978. Throughout his career, he received civilian honors from Japan, India, Hungary, and Pakistan. In 2000, Suzuki took the role of chairman of the company, and he passed away in December 2024.

- Kazuo Kumabe: Vice-President of Toyota

Born in 1897, Kumabe studied mechanics at Tokyo Imperial University and conducted research in thermal conduction and internal combustion engines. He wrote a book on the latter, which became a popular source of reference in Japan. After the war, he was appointed MD of Toyota, but left in the early 1950s to form Kumabe Research. He died in 1974.

- Junya Toyokawa: Founder of Hakuyosha/Otomo

Born in 1886, Toyokawa entered the Tokyo Institute of Technology in 1907 but left quickly. He traveled to the US in 1913, and upon returning to Japan in 1915, began researching and building internal combustion engines. He built two prototype vehicles in 1921, providing the foundation for the Otomo car of 1922. Although the Otomo was Japan's first exported car, the marque disappeared after around 300 machines were built, as it was unable to compete with locally-built Ford and GM products. He died in 1965.

- Masujiro Hashimoto: Founder of Kaishinsha/DAT

Born in 1874, Hashimoto went to the States after graduating from the Tokyo Institute of Technology and worked at a steam locomotive factory. However, whilst in the US, he met Henry Leland. Inspired by Leland's work, Hashimoto established the Kaishinsha Automobile Factory, which provided the building block for the Datsun brand. Hashimoto died in 1944.

- Kunimitsu Takahashi: Racing Driver and Motorcyclist

Born in 1940, Takahashi started his racing career, becoming a works rider with the Honda team. After a bad crash in the 1962 Isle of Man TT race, he turned to four wheels, racing for Nissan and Honda, competing at the top level until 1999. He was still heavily involved in motorsport promotion. He died in March 2022.

=== 2003 ===
- Tsuneji Matsuda: President of Mazda

Born in Osaka in 1895, Matsuda joined Toyo Kogyo (forerunner of Mazda) in 1927, became a director in 1938, and became the president and CEO of the company in 1951. In 1961, Mazda signed a contract to work on the development of the Wankel engine, developing the first, two-rotor, motorsports car. The Cosmo Sport 110S was launched in 1967 as a result. Matsuda fell ill and died in 1970.

- Shotaro Kamiya: Sales Network Specialist

Kamiya was born in 1898. After working abroad with trading companies, he took up a sales position at GM (Japan) in 1928, of which he progressed into the role of Vice Director. Kamiya joined Toyota Motor Co., Ltd.'s automotive division as a sale manager in 1935. In 1950, after the company was split in two (Toyota Motor Sales Co., Ltd., and Toyota Motor Co., Ltd.), Kamiya was made the founding president of Toyota Motor Sales. As president, he continued to expand the network of franchised dealers and outlets selling Toyota products, primarily across the creation of Toyota's multi-channel dealer network, which created competition between Toyota's own dealers. The dealerships had expanded to 319 franchised dealers and over 3,300 outlets selling Toyota products during his time as president. He was made honorary chairman of the company in 1975. He died 25th December, 1980.

- Genshichi Asahara: Car Technology Specialist

Asahara was born in 1891 and was primarily interested in chemistry. He joined Yoshisuke Ayukawa's Tobato Casting firm, and moved to Nissan in 1933. He became Nissan’s president in 1942, but resigned in wartime when production turned to military needs. He became an important figure within the GHQ advisory panel, and was the first chairman of the Japan Motor Technology Association. After becoming president of Nissan again in 1951, he also headed the Japan Motor Industry Federation (JMIF) for a while. He died in August 1970.

- Masaichi Kondo: R & D Pioneer

Kondo was born in 1908. After studying aeronautics, Kondo applied his knowledge to improve car and motorcycle stability in the post-war years. In 1968, he was named an honorary professor at the Tokyo Institute of Technology, and also the Tokyo Agricultural Industry University. He died in February 1999.

- Michihiro Nishida: Safety Campaigner

Nishida was born in 1923, and joined Honda in 1950. He duly became Honda's MD in 1970, and headed the 'Safety Driving' campaign, which in turn led to the foundation of the International Transport Safety Society, bringing in ideas from all over the world to further improve conditions in Japan.

- Yusuke Kaji: Advertising Specialist

Kaji was born in 1931, and was a co-founder of Nippon Design Center. For 40 years, Kaji handled Toyota's advertising campaigns, with his work becoming very influential in promotional circles.

=== 2004 ===
- Carlos Ghosn: President of Nissan

Born in March 1954, Ghosn made his name with Michelin, allowing him to take up the position of VP at Renault in 1996. In June that year, he was announced COO of Nissan, and became president of Nissan in 2000. His 'Nissan Revival Plan' helped turn the finances at Nissan around.

- Tadashi Kume: President of Honda

Born in 1932, Kume joined Honda after completing his studies in mechanical engineering. He became a director at Honda's Technical Centre in 1969 and was appointed president of Honda's Technical Centre in 1977. By 1983, he was president of Honda. He retired in 2002 with a glowing career, a Medal of Honor and several respected books behind him.

- Shozo Maeda: Car Museum Founder

Maeda made his name in bricks but founded the Motorcar Museum of Japan in November 1978, now hosting around 200,000 visitors a year.

- Tatsuo Hasegawa: Toyota Development Engineer

Born in 1916, Hasegawa joined the Tachikawa Aircraft Company after graduating from the Tokyo Imperial University. He moved to Toyota in 1946, and gained a good reputation in the field of aerodynamics. He was also involved in the development of the first generation Crown, and was appointed chief engineer on the first generation Corolla and first generation Celica/Carina projects. He was appointed Toyota's MD in 1978, retiring from the company in 1988.

- Mineo Yamamoto: Scholar/Doctor of Engineering

Born in 1903, Yamamoto studied aeronautics at Tokyo Imperial University. After the war, he used his extensive knowledge of aero-engines for motor vehicle applications, and also worked in the field of car body design, becoming a leading light in measuring body stress. He was a top professor, and receiving a medal for his work a few years before his death in 1979.

- Shinroku Momose: Subaru Development Engineer

Born in 1919, Momose joined the Nakajima Aircraft Co. in 1942 after graduating from Tokyo Imperial University. He was quickly assigned to the Navy to research jet engine and turbocharger development, but returned to Nakajima after the war. He developed the Rabbit scooter, and was involved in all of the early Subaru road car projects – the most famous being the Subaru 360 minicar of 1958. Momose was made Executive Chief Engineer in 1968, and he remained close to the industry long after his retirement. He died in 1997.

=== 2005 ===
- Yasusada Nobumoto: Auto-Parts Specialist

Born in 1920, after a spell in the army, Nobumoto eventually joined the Akebono Brake concern in 1950. He was given an executive position there within a year, and became president in 1964. He moved into the chairman's office in 1990, and was also chairman of the Japan Parts Association for many years. He died in 2003.

- Yoshio Nakamura: Honda Development Engineer

Born in 1918, Nakamura graduated from Tokyo Imperial University after studying aeronautical engineering. With the closure of the Nakajima Aircraft Co., he moved across to Fuji Sangyo, working on automotive engine design. He joined Honda in 1958, making his name in the R&D department and as a leading light in Honda's first venture into the world of F1. He retired in 1977 and died in December 1994.

- Shinichiro Sakurai: Nissan Development Engineer

Born on April 3, 1929. After graduating from Yokohama National University, Sakurai joined Prince as a chassis engineer in 1952, and was heavily involved in the development of the first generation Skyline. He continued to head the Skyline project long after the Nissan takeover, and was appointed president of Autech (a Nissan subsidiary) in 1986. He died of heart failure on January 17, 2011.

- Kiyoshi Tomizuka: Two-stroke Engine specialist

Born in 1893, Tomizuka studied mechanical engineering at Tokyo Imperial University. After a period of aeronautical research he went to Europe, and on his return to Japan in 1923, became a leading figure in two-stroke technology. He continued to lecture at various universities until 1966. He died at the age of 94.

- Heitatsu Igarashi: Motoring Historian

Born in 1924, Igarashi joined Isuzu after studying mechanical engineering. After the war, he moved to the Ohta coachbuilding concern, but established his own design consultancy business in 1950, becoming a freelance writer and photographer at roughly the same time. He was an editor of Motor Review and a respected motoring historian. He died in December 2000.

=== 2006 ===
- Nobuhiko Kawamoto: President of Honda

Born in 1936, Kawamoto studied precision engineering and joined Honda in 1963. He became heavily involved in automotive engine design and development and was an important member of the team that created the legendary CVCC unit. After several executive positions, he was named Honda's president in 1990, and continues to act as a consultant in his retirement years. He was awarded a KBE from Britain in 1999.

- Hirosuke Furusho: Safety Specialist

Born in Kobe in 1932, Furusho joined Daihatsu in 1955. He was renowned for his work on driving stability, and moved up through the ranks at Daihatsu, becoming VP in 1996. He is an honorary member of the Motor Technology Federation.

- Toshiro Seki: Diesel Engine Specialist

Born in 1908, Seki became involved in automobiles when the steel foundry he was working for established a car-building business. He became a professor at Waseda University and was well respected for his work on diesel engines. He died in 1979 in an air accident over the South Pole.

- Atsushi Watari: NVH Specialist

Born in 1917, Watari graduated from Tokyo Imperial University in 1941, majoring in aeronautics. After a spell with the Nakajima Aircraft Co., he became a Doctor of Engineering and later a professor at Tokyo University. Best known for his work on automotive springs and NVH control, he was heavily involved with JARI and FISITA before his retirement in 1978. He died in 1983, aged 66.

- Yasusaburo Kobori: Airbag Pioneer

Born in 1899, Kobori was largely self-taught. After a spell with the Osaka Electric Railway Co., he formed his own machinery business in 1937, which was duly incorporated into the Ishikawajima Heavy Industries business. In 1962, he moved to Tokyo and started work on an airbag system. He died in 1975, sadly too soon to see his invention gain worldwide acceptance.

=== 2007 ===
- Taiichi Ohno: Manufacturing Specialist

Ohno was born in February 1912, and after graduating from Nagoya Kogyo University, joining the Toyoda Spinning and Weaving company. He was transferred to that concern's Toyota car project and established a wide range of manufacturing techniques, including the 'Just In Time' method that is still a widely used system in the motor industry to this day. He also improved machinery and brought about a number of quality control practices that gave Toyota an unrivaled reputation in the field. He ultimately became Toyota's VP in 1978, but died in 1990.

- Kenichi Yamamoto: President of Mazda

Born in 1922, Yamamoto studied mechanical engineering at Tokyo Imperial University. He joined Toyo Kogyo (Mazda) just after the war and became heavily involved in automotive engine design. In April 1963, he headed the RE development team, dedicated to making the Wankel engine suitable for production and eventually perfected this beautiful power-unit. He was named president of Mazda in 1984, and then chairman in 1987. He retired in 1992.

- Takeshi Nakatsuka: R & D Pioneer

Born in 1926, Nakatsuka joined Isuzu after graduating from university. He worked on powerplant and body engineering and was duly appointed head of R & D in 1965. He became president of Shatai Kogyo Ltd in 1988, and was named chairman of Isuzu R & D in 1992.

- Hachiro Ogihara: Tooling Specialist

Born in 1906, Ogihara joined the Nakajima Aircraft Co. in 1921 and rose to the position of factory manager. However, when Japan's industry was reorganized following the war, he joined Fuji Sangyo (Subaru) for a short time before establishing the Ogihara Iron Works to create press dies. An early order from Subaru's bus department started things rolling, before Honda invested in the company. Ogihara died in 1983, but his company now supplies precision dies to car manufacturers all over the world.

- Fujio Uruno: Safety Specialist

Born in 1917, Uruno became attached to the scientific department of the police force to study safety issues. A professor at Nihon University from 1969, he continued to work in the safety arena until his death in 1997.

- Kenshichiro Suzuki: Car-Test Magazine Pioneer

Born in 1903, Suzuki joined the staff of Motor Fan magazine pre-war and became its publisher in a post-war revival of the title. The road test format was devised to give readers the ultimate level of information. Suzuki duly formed Sanai Shobo in 1952, giving birth to more motoring magazines. He died in 1963, but his legacy lives on.

=== 2008 ===
- Yutaka Katayama: Influential President of Datsun in America

Born in 1909, Katayama graduated from Keio University and joined Nissan in 1935. He was responsible for the first Tokyo Motor Show in 1954, and founded Nissan's operations in America. His management style allowed the Datsun brand to flourish in the States until his return to Japan in 1977. He was inducted into the AHF in 1998.

- Jiro Tanaka: Respected Prince Engineer

Tanaka was born in Tokyo in 1917. He graduated from Tokyo Institute of Technology in 1939 and joined the Tachikawa Aircraft Co. soon after. In the same year, he was recruited to the Army as a Sergeant (he was promoted to 1st Lieutenant in February 1940) and was assigned to evaluate the new engines for the Army aircraft. In 1944, he was sent to his home company Tachikawa to complete the design of the Tachikawa Ki-74. Following the war, after the reorganization of various firms, he became a valued employee at Prince, moving up through the ranks to executive level. He became VP of Nissan Diesel in 1983, retiring six years later.

- Seiichi Inagawa: The man behind the first Suzuki Kei-car

Born in 1925, Inagawa joined Suzuki after the war rising to an executive of the company in 1973. He has received numerous awards, including a medal from the Emperor in 1997.

- Katsumi Kageyama: Respected Professor of Engineering

Kageyama was born in Kyushu in 1920 and graduated from Nippon University in 1943. He became a naval engineer, working on aero-engines and then taught the subject at his old university, eventually becoming a professor in 1965. He wrote numerous books and received an Emperor’s medal. He died in 2008, a few months before receiving this latest award.

- Michiko Miyasu: Safety Specialist

Born in 1929, Miyasu joined the Marubeni trading company in 1946, before establishing her own shop five years later. In 1967, she set up a business that brought computer technology into the automotive world to enhance safety and has since received many awards for her work.

== Yearly Awards ==
In addition to the induction of individuals who have made significant contributions in the automotive field, JAHFA introduced annual awards for the best domestic car, import car, design, technology and historic car. To this date, the following vehicles and designs have been singled out for recognition:

=== 2001–2002 ===
- Best Domestic Car: Honda Fit; Toyota Estima Hybrid
- Best Domestic Design Toyota Camry; Nissan Primera

=== 2002–2003 ===
- Best Domestic Car: Mazda Atenza; Honda Accord
- Best Domestic Design: Toyota Ist; Nissan Cube

=== 2003–2004 ===
- Best Domestic Car: Mazda RS-8
- Best Domestic Design: Toyota Prius
- Best Technology: Honda V6 engine
- Best Import Car: Volkswagen Touareg
- Best Import Design: Porsche Cayenne
- Historic Car of Japan: Mazda Cosmo 110S

=== 2004–2005 ===
- Best domestic car: Toyota Crown/Majesta
- Best domestic design: Toyota Porte
- Best Domestic Technology: Honda Legend
- Best Import Car: Maserati Quattroporte
- Best Import Design: Audi A6
- Best Import Technology: Volkswagen Golf
- Historic Car of Japan: Subaru 360

=== 2005–2006 ===
- Best Domestic car: Honda Civic
- Best Import car: Peugeot 407
- Best Design: BMW 3 Series
- Best Technology: Lexus GS430
- Historic Car of Japan: Honda Civic

=== 2006 ===
- Best Domestic Car: Lexus LS460
- Best import car: Alfa Romeo Brera
- Best design: Mitsubishi i
- Best technology: Audi TT Coupe
- Historic car of Japan: Toyota Crown

=== 2007–2008 ===
- Best domestic car: Honda Fit
- Best import car: Volkswagen Golf Variant
- Best design: Mazda Demio
- Best technology: Nissan Skyline
- Historic car of Japan: Daihatsu Midget

=== 2008 ===
- Best domestic car: Toyota iQ
- Best import car: Audi A4
- Best design: Toyota iQ
- Best technology: Nissan X-Trail 20GT
- Historic car of Japan: Suzuki Suzulight

=== 2009–2010 ===
- Best domestic car: Honda Insight
- Best import car: VW Golf
- Best design: Toyota Prius
- Best technology: Mitsubishi i-MiEV

=== 2010–2011 ===
- Best domestic car: Honda Fit Hybrid
- Best import car: VW Polo
- Best design: Honda CR-Z
- Best technology: Subaru Legacy (EyeSight ver.2)

=== 2011–2012 ===
- Best domestic car: Nissan Leaf
- Best import car: VW Passat
- Best design: Nissan Leaf
- Best technology: Mazda Demio (SKYACTIV Technology)

=== 2012–2013 ===
- Best domestic car: Honda N BOX+
- Best import car: VW up!
- Best design: VW up!
- Best technology: Mazda CX-5 (SKYACTIV-D 2.2L)

=== 2023–2024 ===
- Historic car of Japan: Otomo (1925)
- Historic car of Japan: Datsun Bluebird/Datsun 510 (1967)
- Historic car of Japan: Mazda 787B (1991)
- Historic car of Japan: Mitsubishi Pajero (1982, first generation)
- Car of the Year: Toyota Prius
