= Hirotoshi =

- Gender: Male

Origin
- Origin: Japanese
- Meaning: Different meanings depending on the kanji used

Hirotoshi (written: 弘寿, 弘年, 博敏, 博俊, 裕稔, 浩俊 or 広俊) is a masculine Japanese given name. Notable people with the name include:

- Aobayama Hirotoshi (青葉山 弘年; 1950–1997), Japanese sumo wrestler
- Fukubara Hirotoshi (福原 広俊; 1512? – 1593), Japanese samurai
- Hirotoshi Honda (本田 博俊; born 1942), Japanese businessman
- Hirotoshi Ishii (石井 弘寿; born 1977), Japanese baseball player
- Hirotoshi Kitagawa (北川 博敏; born 1972), Japanese baseball player
- Hirotoshi Masui (増井 浩俊; born 1984), Japanese baseball player
- Hirotoshi Takanashi (高梨 裕稔; born 1991), Japanese baseball player
- Hirotoshi Yokoyama (横山 博敏; born 1975), Japanese footballer
