= Tadashi Kume =

Japanese businessman (1931–2022)

Tadashi Kume (久米 是志, Kume Tadashi; 2 January 1931 – 11 September 2022) was a Japanese businessman who was the president and CEO of the Honda Motor Co., Ltd.

== Career ==
Tadashi Kume joined Honda in 1954, eventually becoming Honda's 3rd president in 1983. He specialized in designing engines, and, along with other engineers, helped develop the fuel-efficient CVCC. Before becoming president, Kume had a heated argument with then Honda president Soichiro Honda over using air-cooled or water-cooled engines, which led Kume to stay away from work for possibly over a month. He retired in June 1990, and was succeeded by Nobuhiko Kawamoto. Kume is honored in the Japan Automotive Hall of Fame.
