= Honda D-Type =

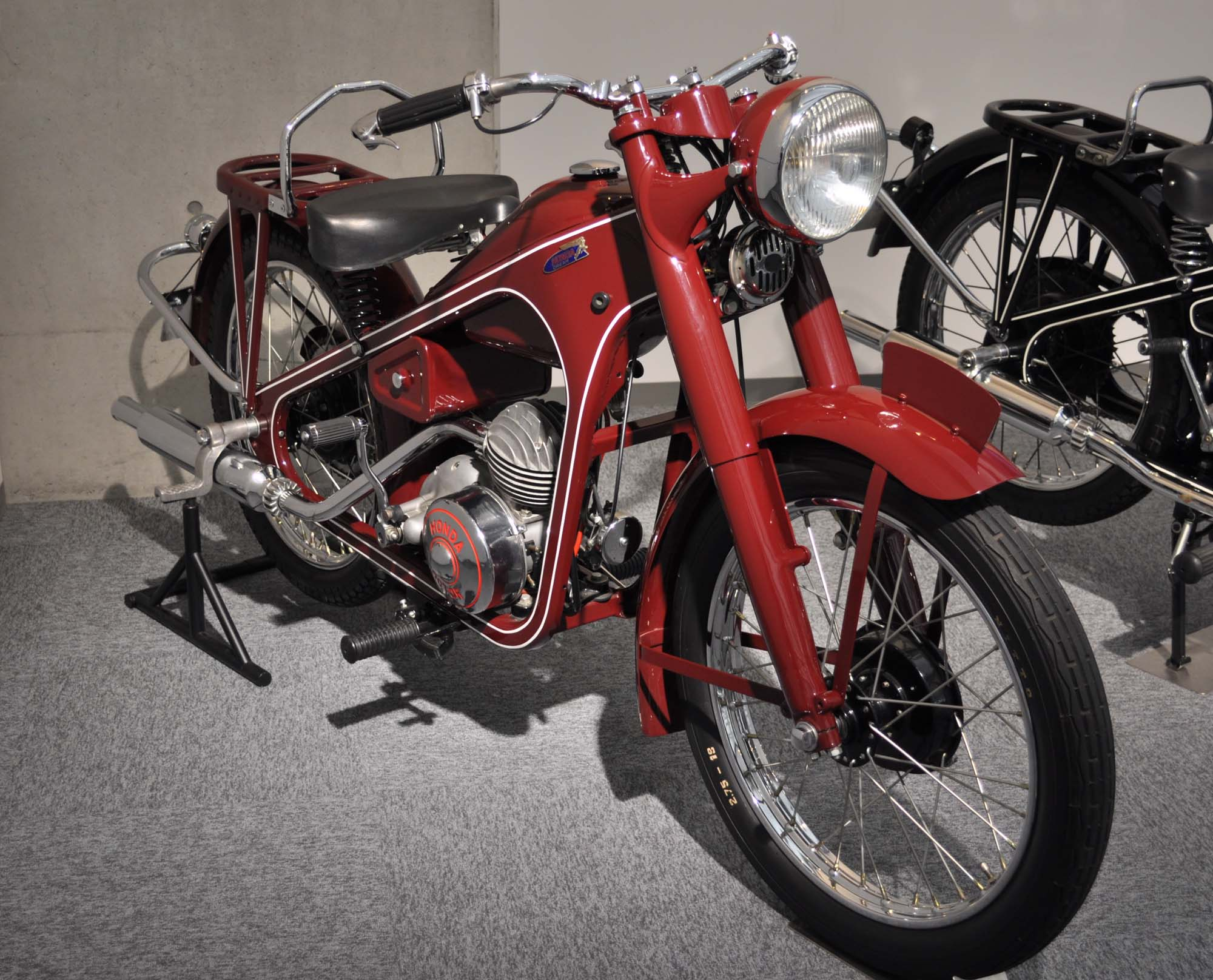
- Manufacturer: Honda
- Also called: Dream, Model D
- Production: August 1949–1951
- Assembly: Japan: Hamamatsu Factory, Hamamatsu, Shizuoka
- Predecessor: C-Type
- Successor: E-Type
- Class: Standard
- Engine: 98 cc (6.0 cu in) two-stroke single-cylinder engine
- Bore / stroke: 50 mm × 50 mm (2.0 in × 2.0 in)
- Power: 3 hp (2.2 kW) at 5000 rpm
- Torque: 3.15 lb⋅ft (4.27 N⋅m)
- Ignition type: Magneto with Kick start
- Transmission: 2-speed semi-automatic
- Frame type: Pressed steel
- Suspension: Front: Telescopic, Rear: Rigid
- Brakes: Drum brakes, front and rear
- Tires: 2.00 x 3.00 front and rear
- Dimensions: L: 2,070 mm (81.5 in); W: 740 mm (29.1 in); H: 970 mm (38.2 in)
- Weight: 80 kg (180 lb) (dry)
- Fuel capacity: 7 L (1.5 imp gal; 1.8 US gal)

The Honda D-Type is the first fully-fledged motorcycle manufactured by Honda. The bike was also known as the Type D and Model D, and was the first of a series of models from Honda to be named Dream. The D-Type was produced from 1949 to 1951.

== Pre-D-Type history ==
In October 1946 Soichiro Honda established Honda Gijutsu Kenkyu Sho (Honda Technical Research Laboratory). The company was based in Hamamatsu, Shizuoka prefecture. Their earliest product was a motorized bicycle, called a pon-pon in the Hamamatsu area. Honda's pon-pon used a WWII surplus generator engine made by Mikuni Shoko and a belt-drive to power the rear wheel. When the supply of surplus motors was gone Honda designed a unique two-stroke engine as a replacement. This engine had rotary valves, a stepped-diameter piston and a tall extension to the cylinder head that caused it to be nicknamed the 'chimney'. This engine was not put into production, and the engineering drawings were subsequently lost. One copy was recreated by Honda engineers in 1996 and put on display in the Honda Collection Hall.

A second, more conventional, two-stroke engine that still used rotary valves was designed next. Designated the A-Type, this engine was later nicknamed 'bata-bata' for its distinctive sound. The A-Type engine displaced 50 cc (3.1 cu in) and developed 1 hp (0.7 kW) at 5000 rpm. Beginning in November 1946 the engine was installed into converted bicycles that, like the engine, were known as the A-Type.

In February 1948 Honda established a new engine manufacturing plant at Noguchi-cho. On 24 September of the same year Honda reorganized his company and incorporated it as Honda Giken Kogyo (Honda Motor Company).

1948 was also the year that Honda developed a small cargo carrier called the B-Type. The chassis of steel channel was built by outside suppliers and was laid out as a tricycle with a single front wheel in a girder fork and a cargo box between the two rear wheels. Power came from an 89 cc (5.4 cu in) engine. The vehicle proved unstable and was cancelled before it went beyond the prototype stage.

The C-Type that followed was another belt-driven two-wheeler. It had a tubular frame designed by Honda and built by contractors that kept the bicycle pedals of Honda's previous models and the girder fork from the B-Type. The C-Type engine displaced 96 cc (5.9 cu in) and produced 3 hp (2.2 kW). Sales of the C-Type started in 1949.

== Features ==
The D-Type featured an air-cooled two-stroke single-cylinder engine like that of the C-Type but with displacement increased to 98 cc (6.0 cu in) and power at 3 hp (2.2 kW) at 5000 rpm. The carburetor was in the front of the engine and exhaust in the rear. The ignition was powered by a magneto, and the bike was started with a kick-start assisted by a decompressor. The transmission was a two-speed semi-automatic unit that integrated the clutch with the gear pedal; the first use of such a transmission in a motorcycle. The rear wheel was driven by a chain rather than a belt. Brakes were drums front and rear. A toolkit was mounted under the seat in a cylindrical holder. The D-Type was the first Honda model without bicycle pedals.

The frame of the D-Type was not made of steel tubes, but rather of sheets of steel that had been pressed into shape. The design of the frame was said to have been influenced by German motorcycles like the star-framed BMW R11 and R16. The D-Type's frame is also reminiscent of the Asahi AA built by Miyata in Japan in the 1930s. The front suspension used telescopic forks, while the rear end was rigid. The bike came with a full lighting system, an upright seating position, and a rear luggage rack.

== Model history ==
The first D-Type was completed in August 1949. Production began at the company's Hamamatsu factory. By late 1949 frames for the D-Type were being produced in the Yamashita plant in Hamamatsu and engines were coming from the Noguchi-cho plant.

Officially the origin of the Dream name is unknown. The most commonly reported story is that at a party to celebrate the completion of the D-Type an employee spontaneously remarked "It's like a dream!" Honda felt that the D-Type was a step on the path to fulfilling his own aspirations, and made the bike's official name "Dream Type D".

The D-Type proved popular and sales were good to begin with. Shortly afterwards the effects of the United States' occupationary General Headquarters (GHQ) program of fiscal austerity called the Dodge Line began pushing Japan's economy into recession and putting pressure on Honda. In August 1949 Honda met with Takeo Fujisawa at the home of mutual friend Hiroshi Takeshima. Fujisawa joined the Honda Motor Company in October 1949 as managing director. He would be responsible for financial matters and sales while leaving design and production to Honda.

After discovering that their distributors were installing more D-Type engines into competitor Kitagawa's frames than selling D-Type motorcycles, Fujisawa told them that if they wanted to sell the D-Type, they would have to become Honda distributors exclusively and could no longer mount Honda engines in frames bought from other manufacturers. Fujisawa was threatened physically because of this policy, and Honda lost some distributors because of it, but this also opened new sales areas for the company.

The Korean war broke out on 25 June 1950, and the US military's special procurement purchases for the conflict boosted the economy in general and Honda's fortunes specifically. In Autumn 1950 Honda bought a former sewing machine plant in Kita ward in Tokyo, outfitted it for production of D-Types and installed a conveyor system to speed assembly. Assembly of the D-Type was moved to this location. Honda received a Bicycle Industry Grant of ¥400,000 from Japan's Ministry of International Trade and Industry (MITI) in October 1950 and an additional ¥100,000 Bicycle Innovation Grant in December, which enabled Honda to increase production of the D-Type to 167 units per month by the end of the year and 300 units per month after that. By the end of 1950 production of the D-Type was over 3500 units.

Sales of the D-Type began to slow. Honda recognized that some owners did not like the semi-automatic transmission. The two-speed transmission required the rider to keep constant pressure on the shift pedal while riding or the transmission would drop into neutral. Also, while tube-framed bikes were liable to break on Japan's poor roads of the time, they were considered better looking than the pressed-steel D-Type. The bikes' narrow space between the tire and fender was prone to filling with mud. Competitors had introduced four-stroke motorcycles, and Fujisawa told Honda that their motorcycle was not selling well was because its two-stroke made "unpleasant, high-pitched noises". Honda would address these issues with his next motorcycle, the E-Type, which was unveiled in 1951.

Honda did not export motorcycles from Japan until 1952, when the Type-F Cub was introduced to Taiwan. Any bikes that made it out of Japan prior to that did so by the efforts of individual owners.

Honda considers the D-Type their first motorcycle, and they count their motorcycle production milestones from the start of production of the D-Type.
