= EFI Technology =

Automotive electronics engineering company

EFI Technology Inc.
- Type: Private company
- Industry: Automotive, Defense
- Founded: October 1988
- Founder: Graham Western
- Headquarters: Phoenix, Arizona
- Area served: Worldwide
- Products: Engine Control and Data Acquisition Systems
- Services: Engineering
- Owner: Graham Western
- Website: efitechnology.com

EFI Technology Inc. founded by Graham Western in October 1988 is an independent high-performance automotive electronics engineering company based in Phoenix, Arizona. The company is well recognized for innovative ideas, advanced digital electronics and software for both the aerospace and racing industries.

After earning a master's degree in engineering from Cranfield University in Bedfordshire, England, Graham Western gained several years experience developing Formula 1 and Indy Car engine management systems while working at Cosworth Engineering. In 1987 he moved to Torrance, California and worked as an engineer for Michael Andretti's Indy car team prior to founding EFI Technology Inc. in 1988.

== Corporate history ==
The company has a strong racing background introducing its first fully user programmable ECU in 1988 which was adopted by Pontiac Motorsports for its IMSA racing program. The products success led to interest from several other engine manufacturers and the company expanded its product line designing additional systems for the Automotive, Off-road and Marine industries.

In 1990, the company was contracted by TRD to develop an ECU for its 503E engine program. The 503E was one of the most successful Toyota race engines ever built producing amazing results on the track. The All American Racers, Eagle MKIII dominated in GTP setting records, including 21 of 27 races entered and an IMSA record 14 straight victories. The company went on to produce additional products for TRD for their Toyota Atlantic Series, SCORE Off-road truck and Stadium truck programs.

In 1991, the company ventured into Indy Cars working with several teams using the Buick Indy Engine. In 1992 Al Unser, Sr. drove the Team Menard Buick-powered Lola to a 3rd-place finish, the best finish ever for the Buick Indy engine, and the first time the Buick engine had gone the entire 500 miles. In 1993, driving for King Racing, Unser led 15 laps to extend his career laps-led record of any driver in the history of the Indianapolis 500, at 644.

In 1995, the company diversified and started designing systems for the military. Its first product was an ECU developed for a high output endurance V8 engine used by NSWDG, the Naval Special Warfare Development Group. Its instant success led to further products for the defense industry and continues today working in the Aerospace industry specializing in systems for high altitude UAV's.

In 1996, the company started working with the UK based engine company Neil Brown Engineering who was the European agent for the Mugen-Honda BTCC touring car and F3 engine programs. The F3 engine would dominate the series with 10 championships in a row from 1996 to 2005. The touring car program achieved 13 podium places in 1997.

Nissan entered the IRL in 1997 with its Infiniti 4.0-liter DOHC 32-valve V8 engine. It was controlled by the companies latest 2.5 series ECU and CD Ignition System. The system featured a unique self learn lambda strategy that simplified engine tuning and enhanced engine performance. The system was later adopted by teams using the competing Aurora engine.

In 1999, the company continued working with Mugen developing an engine controller and ignition system for their NSX engine program. The NSX competed successfully in JGTC followed by the introduction of the V8 MF408S engine for Le Mans and ALMS, also using the company's electronic systems. The debut of the MF408S was in 2002 at the Sebring 12 hour ALMS event.

In 2001 the company introduced its Data Acquisition product line. It initially worked with Team Fernandez in CART and then later that year it added Ganassi Racing to its customer list. Ganassi went on to finish 2nd in the championship before moving to IRL. Mugen also adopted the company's Data Loggers and Dash Displays for its JGTC sports car program and continues to be a distributor for the company's products.

Since 2007 the company has been manufacturing a range of ECU and Ignition products for the Edelbrock corporation marketed under the brand name Pro Flo and Pro Flo XT. The success of this product line prompted the expansion into the data acquisition market and in 2009 Edelbrock introduced the QD2 advanced data logger system.

The company is currently a supplier to Elbit Systems one of the world's largest defense contractors. Products include engine controllers and custom software for UAV's. The UK division of Elbit is currently working on developing the Watchkeeper WK450 for the British Army using a proprietary engine controller designed by EFI Technology.

== Product history ==
- 1988 - Race 1.0 ECU, IMSA & Marine
- 1989 - Performance ECU, general purpose
- 1990 - Race 3.0 ECU, IMSA GTP
- 1991 - Buick Indy Car System
- 1994 - Race 2.0 ECU, Naval Warfare Group
- 1995 - Race 1.8 ECU, F3 system
- 1996 - Race 1.9 ECU, Spec Transam
- 1996 - Race 2.1 ECU, BTCC system
- 1997 - Race 2.5 ECU, IRL system
- 1999 - Race 4.0 ECU, Mugen NSX & MF408S
- 2004 - Race 1.2 ECU, Motorcycle
- 2006 - X1 ECU, Midget & Sprint cars
- 2007 - X3 ECU, UAV system
- 2007 - X1e ECU, Edelbrock Pro Flo
- 2008 - XTR ECU, Drag Racing
- 2009 - X5 ECU, 12 cylinder
- 2010 - X2 ECU, Motorcycle
- 2011 - X1s ECU, Sportsman
- 2012 - R1z ECU, TBI system
- 2014 - R1e ECU, Edelbrock Pro Flo III
- 2015 - R1i ECU, USAC Midget Ignition
- 2015 - R1 ECU, LS Control System
- 2016 - R4 ECU, Racing Applications
- 2016 - R8 ECU, Racing Applications
- 2016 - R16 ECU, Drag Racing (16 injector)
- 2018 - R2 ECU, Aerospace (4 injector)
- 2021 - R1i Outlaw, Midget Ignition
