= Mugen Motorsports =

Japanese automotive tuning company

M-TEC Co., Ltd.
- Trade name: Mugen Motorsports
- Type: Private
- Industry: Automotive
- Genre: Car tuning
- Founded: 1973
- Founders: Hirotoshi Honda; Masao Kimura
- Headquarters: Asaka, Saitama, Japan
- Website: www.mugen-power.com

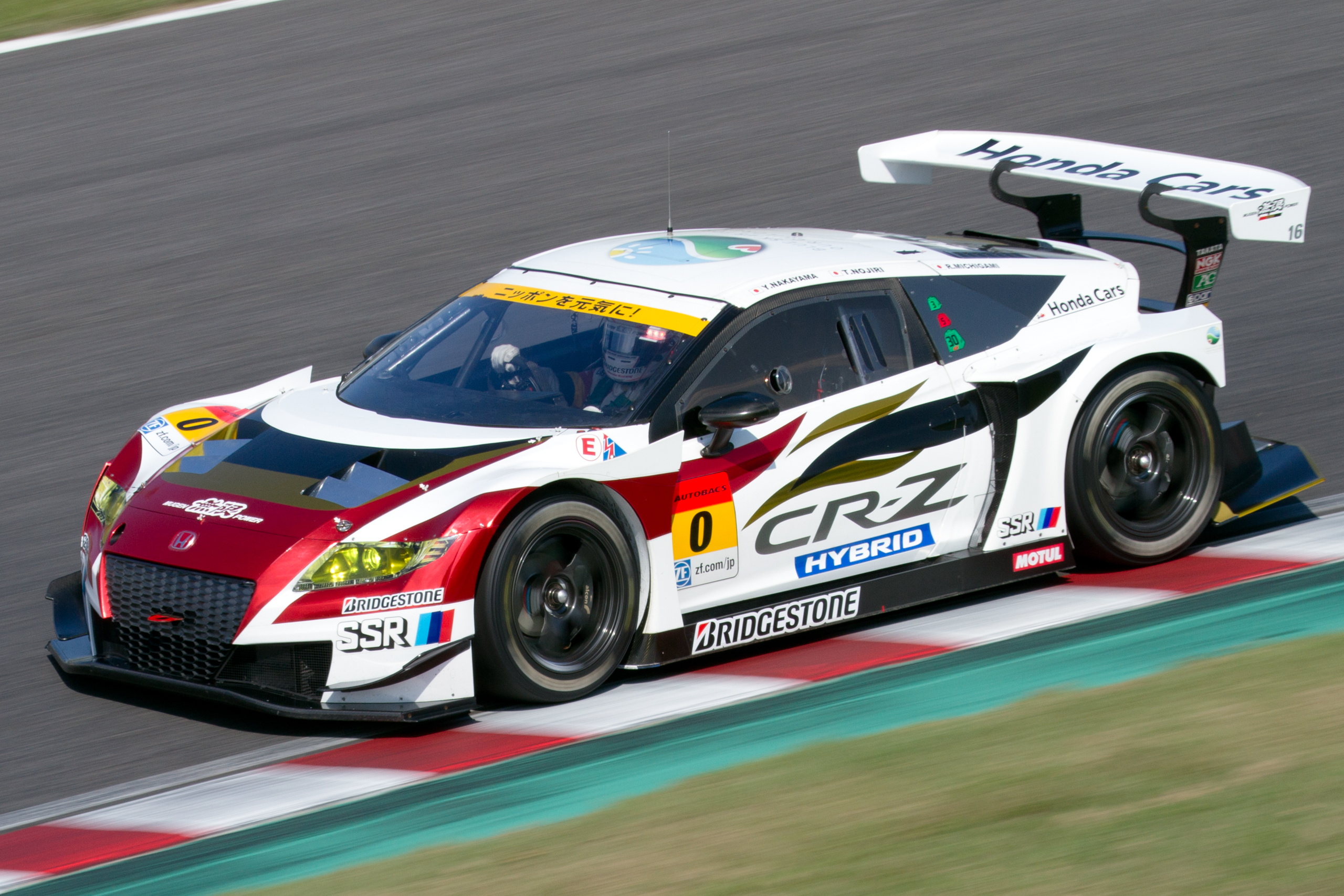
CR-Z. Super GT 2014 Rd.6 Suzuka 1000km: Yuhki Nakayama (Team Mugen)

M-TEC Company, Ltd., doing business as Mugen Motorsports (無限), is a Japanese company formed in 1973 by Hirotoshi Honda, the son of Honda Motor Company founder Soichiro Honda, and Masao Kimura. Mugen, meaning "without limit", "unlimited" or "vast", (hence the commonly placed word "power" after, denoting "unlimited power") is an engine tuner and parts manufacturer that manufactures OEM parts such as body kits and sports exhausts for Honda. Despite the family relationship, Mugen is not and has never been owned by Honda Motor Company; however, Mugen owner Hirotoshi Honda has been the biggest shareholder in Honda since his father's death in 1991.

The company tunes and races Honda vehicles in the Super GT championship, and, additionally, sells aftermarket parts to amateur enthusiasts. It was part of partnerships that won the Formula 3000 championship in 1990 and 1991, and that eventually led to Mugen's involvement in Formula One, from 1992 to 2000, and up to 2005 was the exclusive supplier of Formula Nippon engines.

== Corporate history ==
The company has a strong racing heritage, as Hirotoshi Honda began building his own racing car in a workshop at his father's house, shortly before he graduated from Nihon University in 1965. Masao Kimura is a veteran racer with more than 50 victories in Honda sports cars and single-seaters and worked for Honda R&D and then Honda Racing Service before helping Hirotoshi Honda establish Mugen.

In 1973, Mugen started its operations and initially offered special parts of motocross bikes. As Honda expanded its vehicle lineup, Mugen's product range also expanded. The company started specializing in tuning Honda engines. Beginning with the 1200cc Honda Civic engine, it went on to develop, and now designs and builds, both two-stroke and four-stroke engines, manufacturing many of the major components itself.

Mugen ultimately intends to build its own road cars and the first step towards this was the creation of bodykits for the Honda Ballade CR-X in 1984. Since then, the company has produced a number of body kits for Honda machinery, culminating with the Mugen NSX prototype in 1992.

Following Hirotoshi Honda's tax evasion allegation in late 2003, Mugen was restructured in early 2004 with the establishment of M-TEC. The new company retained the right to use the Mugen trademark and its headquarters in Asaka, Saitama, in the northern suburbs of Tokyo close to the Honda R&D facility at Wako. Although it is a legally separate entity, M-TEC kept Mugen's existing staff and is headed by former Mugen board member Shin Nagaosa, who was the engineering division manager at Mugen and been involved with running Mugen's NSX racing program.

== Mugen Racing ==
=== Single-seaters ===
Working with Honda, Mugen has gradually expanded its sporting involvement to all levels of the sport. In 1986, Formula 3000 was introduced into Japan and Mugen joined forces with Honda to build an F3000 engine. It was introduced in the 1987 season and leased to 14 teams. The following year, Mugen won four of the top five places in the Japanese F3000 championship. In 1989, Mugen entered European F3000 with the MF308 engine and won the championship with Jean Alesi, driving an Eddie Jordan Racing Reynard. The same year the company produced its own prototype 3.5L V8 Formula One engine, codenamed MF350.

In 1988, Mugen started tuning Honda engines for use in Formula Three, winning the Japanese series with Akihiko Nakaya, and in 1990 expanded their business to Europe. The same year, Mugen won its first Formula Three championships in Europe, taking the French title with Éric Hélary, and the British crown with Mika Häkkinen at the wheel of a West Surrey Racing Ralt, which repeated the title in 1991 with Rubens Barrichello.

As F3000 became a spec-series in Europe starting in 1996 with the Lola-Judd combo, the Japanese series responded by making Mugen the sole supplier to the Japanese championship, now redubbed Formula Nippon. M-TEC lost the supply contract for the 2006 season, with the rules changing to allow Toyota associate TOM'S to join Mugen as engine supplier.

Mugen continues to enjoy success in the Formula Three circuit with its tuned 2.0 L Honda engines, having won 9 titles in Asia (8 of which in Japan) since 1988, as well as 19 titles in Europe (15 of them in Britain), and 13 in Latin America.

As of 2017, Mugen Formula engines still enjoy use and success across the various European hillclimb championships, employed in former Formula chassis and dedicated hillclimb prototypes.

=== Formula One ===
Mugen-Honda as a Formula One engine manufacturer
Formula One World Championship career
- First entry: 1992 South African Grand Prix
- Last entry: 2000 Malaysian Grand Prix
- Races entered: 147
- Chassis: Footwork, Lotus, Ligier, Prost, Jordan
- Constructors' Championships: 0
- Drivers' Championships: 0
- Race victories: 4
- Podiums: 16
- Points: 182
- Pole positions: 1
- Fastest laps: 0

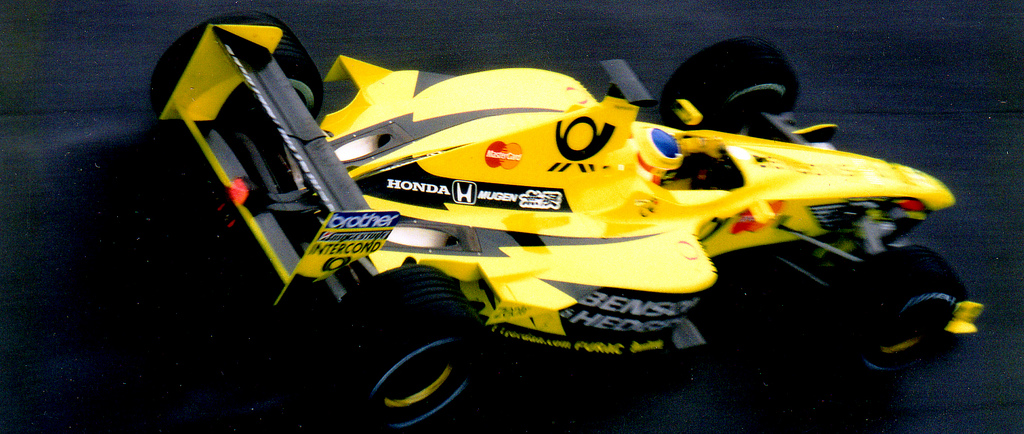
Mugen supplied Honda-derived engines to the Jordan Formula One team between 1998 and 2000.

In 1991 Mugen prepared Honda V10 engines for Tyrrell (based on engines used by McLaren in 1989 and 1990), but the following year these engines were renamed Mugen MF351H and were transferred to the Footwork team, with drivers Aguri Suzuki and Michele Alboreto. Although Honda withdrew from the sport at the end of 1992 season, Mugen remained affiliated with Footwork in 1993 and created a B version of the MF351H, used by Aguri Suzuki and Derek Warwick.

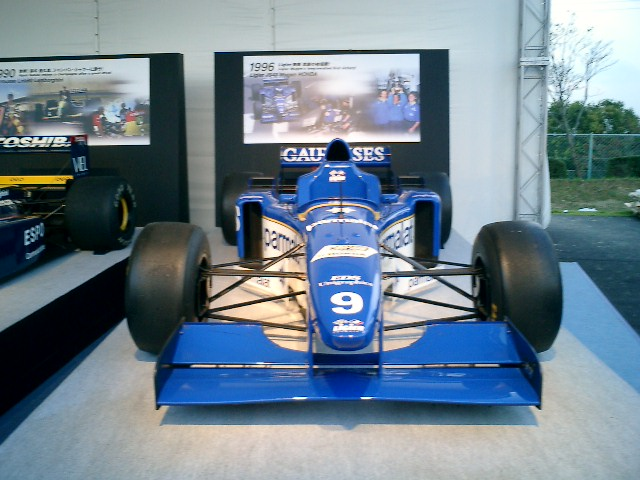
JS43 of the type driven by Olivier Panis at the 1996 Monaco Grand Prix, on display.

At the end of the year, Mugen switched to Team Lotus with plans for a new Lotus 109. The team—with drivers Johnny Herbert and Pedro Lamy (later replaced by Alessandro Zanardi)—was underfunded and the 109 chassis was late arriving. The Mugen engine, codenamed MF351HC (also known as ZA5C), was not able to show its full potential and failed to score a single World Championship point during 1994 despite coming close on 3 occasions. This was the only season in which Mugen engines (and Lotus) did not score a World Championship point during their time in Formula One.

After Lotus closed at the end of the year, Mugen switched to the Ligier team, which was then being run for Flavio Briatore by Tom Walkinshaw, with drivers Olivier Panis, Martin Brundle and Aguri Suzuki, although it was initially planned for the Minardi team. The 3.0 L engine, conforming to the new regulations, was codenamed MF301H. The 1995 season was promising with points being scored at nine races and the team securing two podiums, one courtesy of Brundle finishing third at the Belgian Grand Prix and the other by Panis finishing second at the Australian Grand Prix. The team secured 24 points and finished a respectable 5th in the Constructors Championship.

The following season with Ligier resulted in Mugen's first Formula One victory as well as Ligier's last Formula One victory at the 1996 Monaco Grand Prix with Panis at the wheel. Despite this unexpected success, the Mugen powered Ligier car only scored three more points finishes during the rest of the season: two 6th-place finishes from Diniz and one 5th-place finish from Panis, while suffering 17 retirements.

Ligier was taken over by Alain Prost in 1997, and the newly named Prost Grand Prix ran MF301HB engines with Jarno Trulli leading the Austrian Grand Prix before suffering an engine failure. The Prost team managed two podium finishes during the 1997 season at Brazil and Spain, scoring points in 8 races over the season securing a final total of 21 points and a 6th-place finish in the Constructors Championship.

With Prost establishing a relationship with Peugeot and switching to them from 1998 onwards, Mugen looked for a new partner and reached a two-year agreement with Jordan Grand Prix for which Mugen produced the MF301HC engine. The first half of the 1998 season was an absolute disaster; it was so bad that at one point Mugen & Honda officials met with Eddie Jordan and his team during the 1998 Monaco Grand Prix to find out why up until then the team had failed to score a single World Championship point. The relationship continued, and at Silverstone a few rounds later the team scored their first World Championship point of the season courtesy of a 6th-place finish from Ralf Schumacher, this was followed by further points finishes at the next 3 races. It was not until Spa-Francorchamps, when Jordan's fortunes changed for the better when drivers Damon Hill and Ralf Schumacher scored a 1–2 finish thus securing Jordan's first ever Formula One victory and their only 1–2 finish during their existence after a crash-marred start. The team would score points on two further occasions with Ralf achieving a 3rd-place finish at the Italian Grand Prix. Gary Anderson would years later reveal that, by that season, Honda's headquarters had increased their involvement in developing the engines that otherwise still carried Mugen branding.

The 1999 season resulted in further success with Heinz-Harald Frentzen winning twice in France and Italy combined with podiums in Australia, Brazil, Germany and Belgium, at one stage of the season Frentzen was even challenging for the Drivers' title, although he ultimately failed in doing so at the later stages due to better performances & reliability from McLaren and Ferrari. Jordan and Mugen ultimately ended the season in 3rd place in the Constructors' standings with 61 points which was their best placed finish in their history.

The 2000 season which was Mugen's final year in Formula One was not as successful. While Frentzen did score 2 podiums in Brazil and the USA, Jordan only scored 17 points which was over 44 points fewer than 1999 and the team suffered over 16 retirements. Jordan and Mugen ultimately finished 6th in the Constructors' standings and, crucially, 3 points behind British American Racing (which ran fully factory Honda engines in their return as an engine supplier) who finished in 5th and with 20 points. After another season (the other being 1992) of having both Honda and Mugen engines racing together, Mugen left Formula One at the end of season, leaving only Honda to supply the engines to Jordan as well in 2001 and 2002.

Mugen-built engines were also used for the RC101B/RC-F1 2.0X, a car built by the Honda R&D Center without direct support from Honda headquarters (previous cars built by the R&D Center used older Honda engines when they supplied engines for McLaren) and for the Honda RA099, an official Honda test car to prepare for Honda's factory engine supply operation.

=== Sportscar racing ===
In 1998, Mugen built four NSX models, two for the Mugen/Dome partnership, one for Team Kunimitsu and one for Nakajima Racing. The cars were fast but unreliable at first, until the Nakajima NSX scored the car's first win at the fourth round in Fuji. This was followed by three more wins (one of them by the Mugen/Dome team), which led to a second place championship finish for Tom Coronel and Kouji Yamanishi. In 1999, the Honda took three more wins, one of those with the Mugen/Dome team of Juichi Wakisaka and Katsutomo Kaneishi scoring a victory at the opening round in Suzuka and finishing the third best team in the championship. In 2000, the Mugen/Dome team was champion with Ryo Michigami, but the car's performance was limited by regulation changes and Michigami reached the title without a single win. Still, Honda won four races, one of them by the second Mugen/Dome car.

In 2001, Mugen concentrated once more in the JGTC, the NSX winning two races, and finishing second (Mugen/Dome) and third (ARTA) in the series. More importantly, in June, the company announced development of a new 4.0 L V8, dubbed MF408S, for the main prototype class in the 24 Hours of Le Mans and American Le Mans Series. At the time, Mugen acknowledged that international sportscar racing was a new category for them. The concept of the MF408S was high power, compact size, durability and reliability. Mugen chose a 4.0 L (N/A) Naturally aspirated engine because they felt through their experience in Formula Three that restrictor size was key to performance. The idea was to save fuel with a smaller displacement engine, since, theoretically, restrictor size will bring power in any engine to a similar level. The main engines in use at the time were producing around 600 hp, including the turbocharged Audi and Cadillac, as well as the larger displacement BMW and the Roush-prepared Ford. Mugen excluded a turbo as this necessitated use of intercoolers to extract maximum performance, which added to the weight and reduced performance.

2002 was a good year for Mugen at the track. The Mugen-prepared NSXs won five rounds, with the Mugen/Dome team winning two races outright, which gave them the Team's championship title. The debut of the MF408S was in a Panoz chassis in the 2002 Sebring 12 Hours, first round of ALMS.

In 2004, M-TEC decided to drop down to GT300 and help train Japanese drivers for GT500 speeds. By grabbing drivers early in their careers, M-TEC would then be able to mold them and have definite access to future champions. M-TEC driver, Hiroyuki Yagi, was sourced from the Integra Series. Giving the drivers experience was more important than developing the car to take the championship. To this end, M-TEC simply detuned the car for the GT300 class without optimizing it for the new power level. Winning the GT300 series by one point over the ARTA Garaiya was an unintended bonus for a dedicated, championship-level team.

Breaking into the United States is another goal for the M-TEC team and the Mugen name. Currently, the authorized dealer of Mugen parts in the US is King Motorsports. Team director Junichi Kumakura thought racing the NSX in the United States was a great way to promote the company in a previously unvisited environment. When asked what else M-TEC would like to accomplish in America with the golden NSX, competing at Sebring and Daytona were marked as attractive goals.

==== MF408S Engine Technical Specifications ====
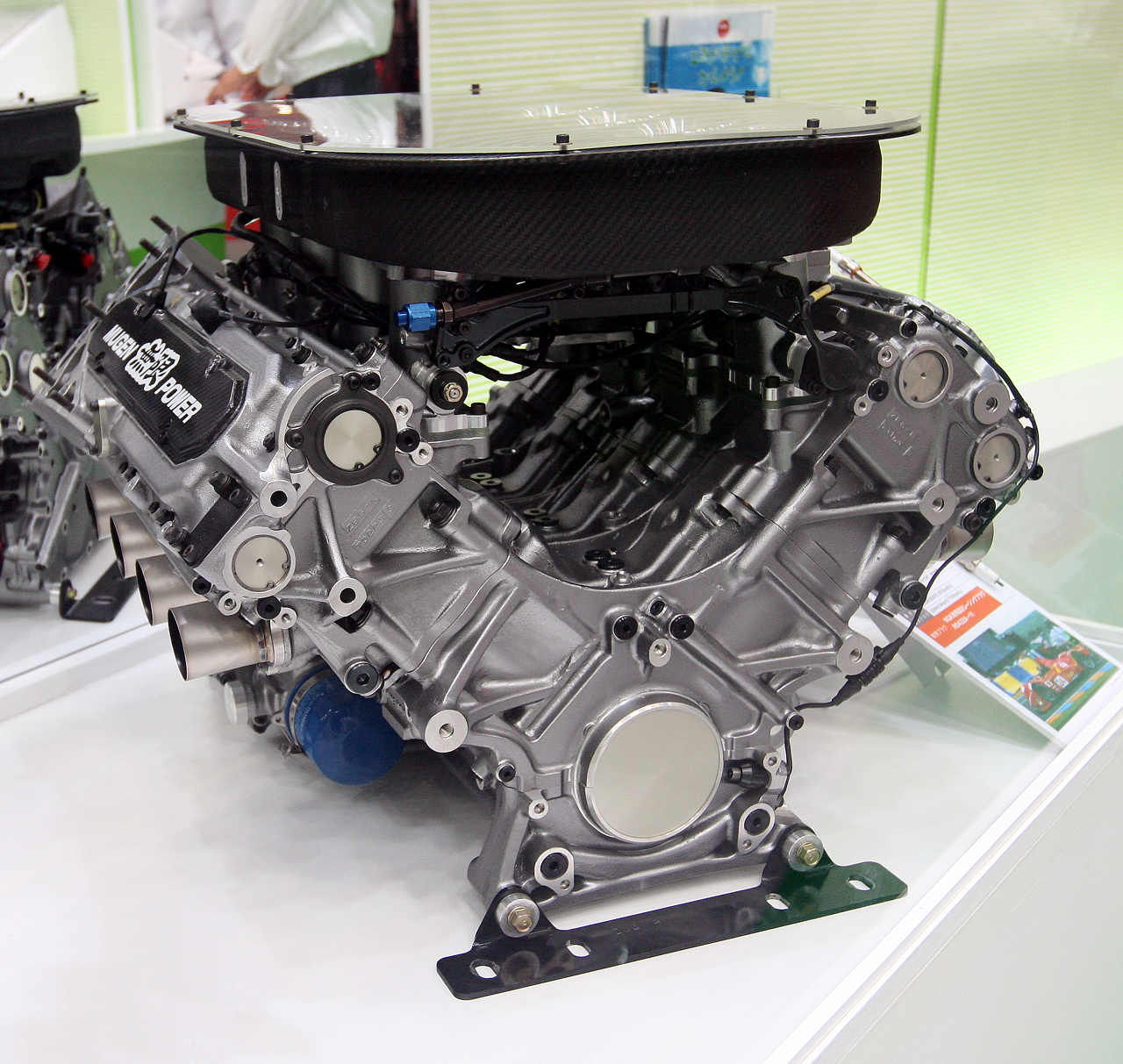
Mugen MF408S engine

- Engine Name: MF408S
- Engine: 90° V8, naturally aspirated
- Displacement: 4,000 cm^{3}
- Bore x Stroke: 97 mm x 67 mm
- Max Power: Over 456 kW (612 hp; 620 PS) @ 9,500 rpm
- Max Torque: Over 520 N⋅m (380 lb⋅ft) @ 7,500 rpm
- Restrictor Size: 33.4 mm x2 or 46.8 mm x1
- Ignition Type: Direct Injection
- ECU System: EFI Technology Inc
- CDI System: EFI Technology Inc
- Clutch Type/Size Carbon / 5.5 inch 4-plate
- Maintenance Interval: >3,000 km (>5,000 km at Le Mans 24h)
- Length: 559 mm (not including flywheel)
- Height: 577 mm (not including flywheel)
- Width: 720 mm
- Weight: 131 kg
- Crank Height: 92 mm

==== MF 458S Engine Technical Specifications ====
Engine Name: MF458S

- Engine: 90° V8, naturally aspirated
- Displacement: 4,500 cm^{3}
- Bore x Stroke: 100 mm x 71.6 mm
- Max Power: 600+ hp (460 kW) @ 8,250 rpm
- Max Torque: 398 lbf·ft (587 N·m) @ 7,000 rpm
- Restrictor Size: 33.1 mm x2 or 46.6 mm x1
- Ignition Type: Direct Injection
- ECU System: EFI Technology Inc
- CDI System: EFI Technology Inc
- Clutch Type/Size Carbon / 5.5 inch 4-plate
- Maintenance Interval: >3,000 km (>5,000 km at Le Mans 24h)
- Length: 559 mm (not including flywheel)
- Height: 577 mm (not including flywheel)
- Width: 720 mm
- Weight: 131 kg
- Crank Height: 92 mm

=== Motorcycle Racing ===
==== Isle of Man TT Races ====
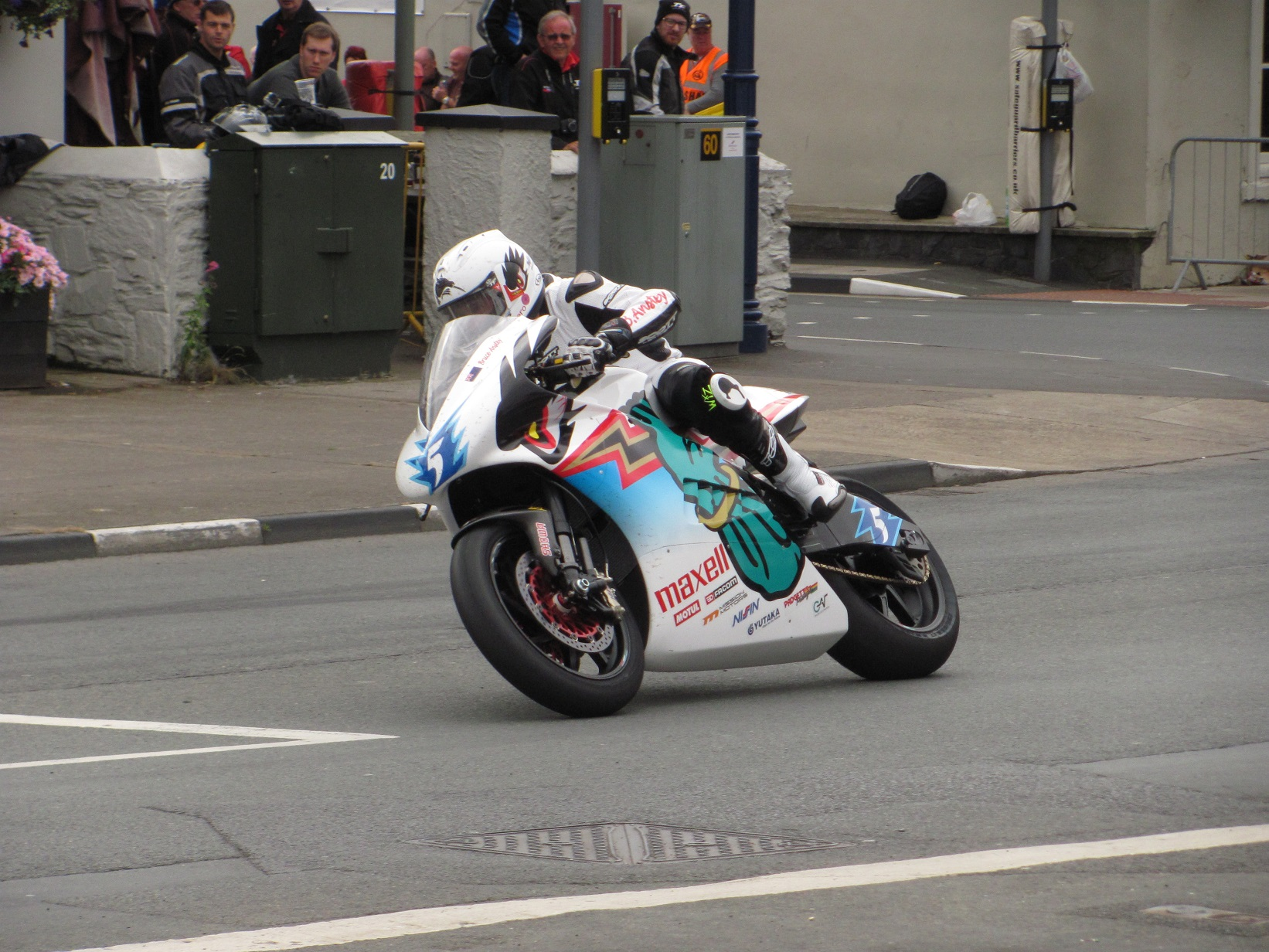
Bruce Anstey on the Team Mugen Shinden San at Parliament Square, Ramsey in 2014

Mugen have become the dominant force in electrically powered motorcycles competing at the Isle of Man TT Races. In the eight years since their introduction into the TT Zero, the average speed of the Mugen Shinden around the Snaefell Mountain Course has increased from 102.215 mph (164.499 km/h) in 2012 to 121.91 mph (196.20 km/h) in 2019. By 2019, Mugen has won five TT Zero races using its Shinden bikes.

2012

Making their competitive debut at the 2012 Isle of Man TT, John McGuinness took the Mugen Shinden Ni to second place behind the MotoCzysz of Michael Rutter at an average speed of 109.527 mph.

2013

At the 2013 TT Mugen again finished runners up to MotoCzysz, with Rutter and McGuinness repeating the previous year's result.

2014

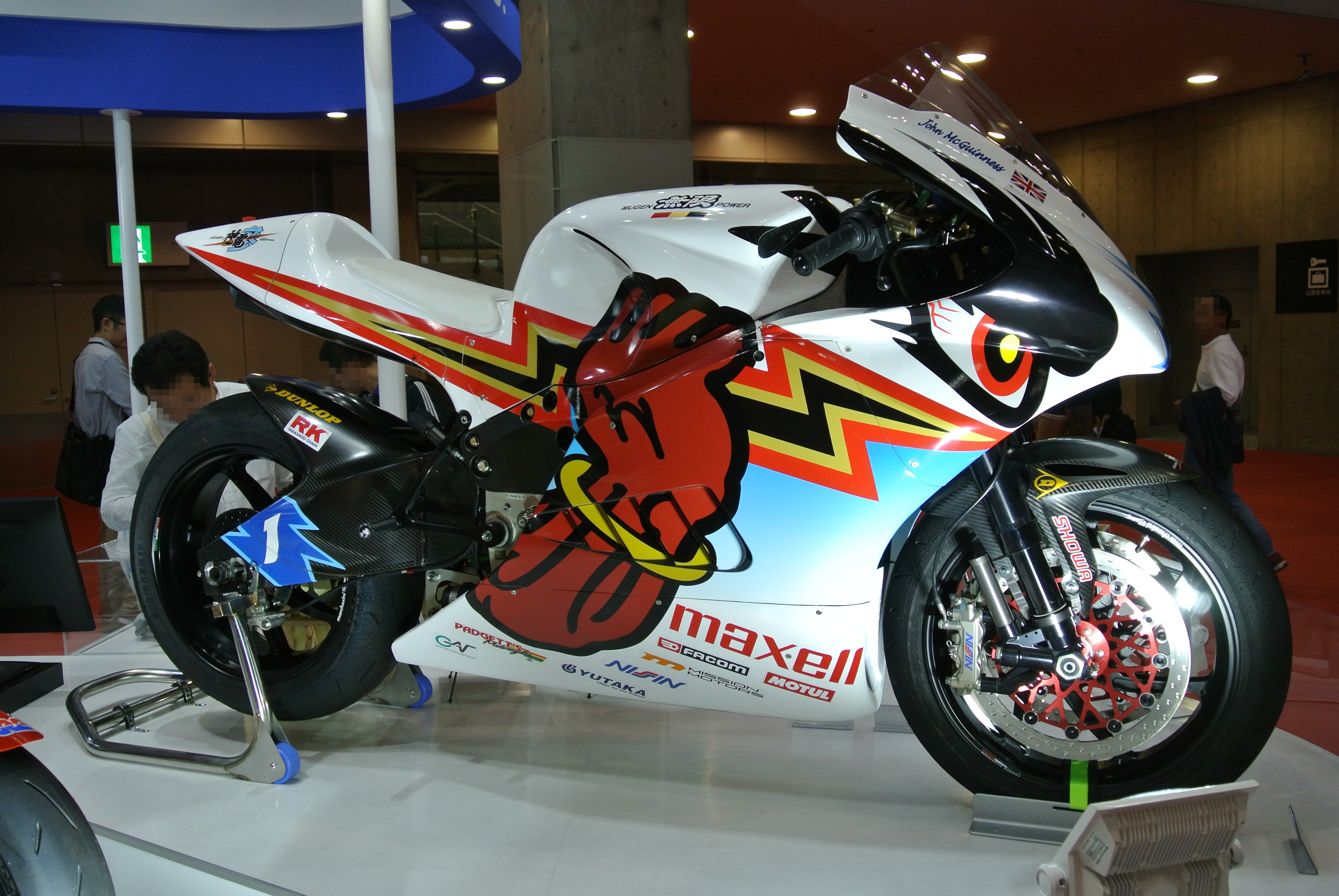
2014 Mugen Shinden San

Mugen's development has continued at subsequent races in the TT Zero Category. Fielding two machines at the 2014 Isle of Man TT, John McGuinness secured their maiden victory ahead of teammate Bruce Anstey who took second place on the other Shinden San.

2015

At the 2015 TT McGuinness and Anstey again took the first two spots on the rostrum.

2016

Mugen continued their dominance in the TT Zero class at the Isle of Man TT Races in 2016, when Bruce Anstey took the honours, although their other machine, ridden by John McGuinness, retired during the one lap event.

2017

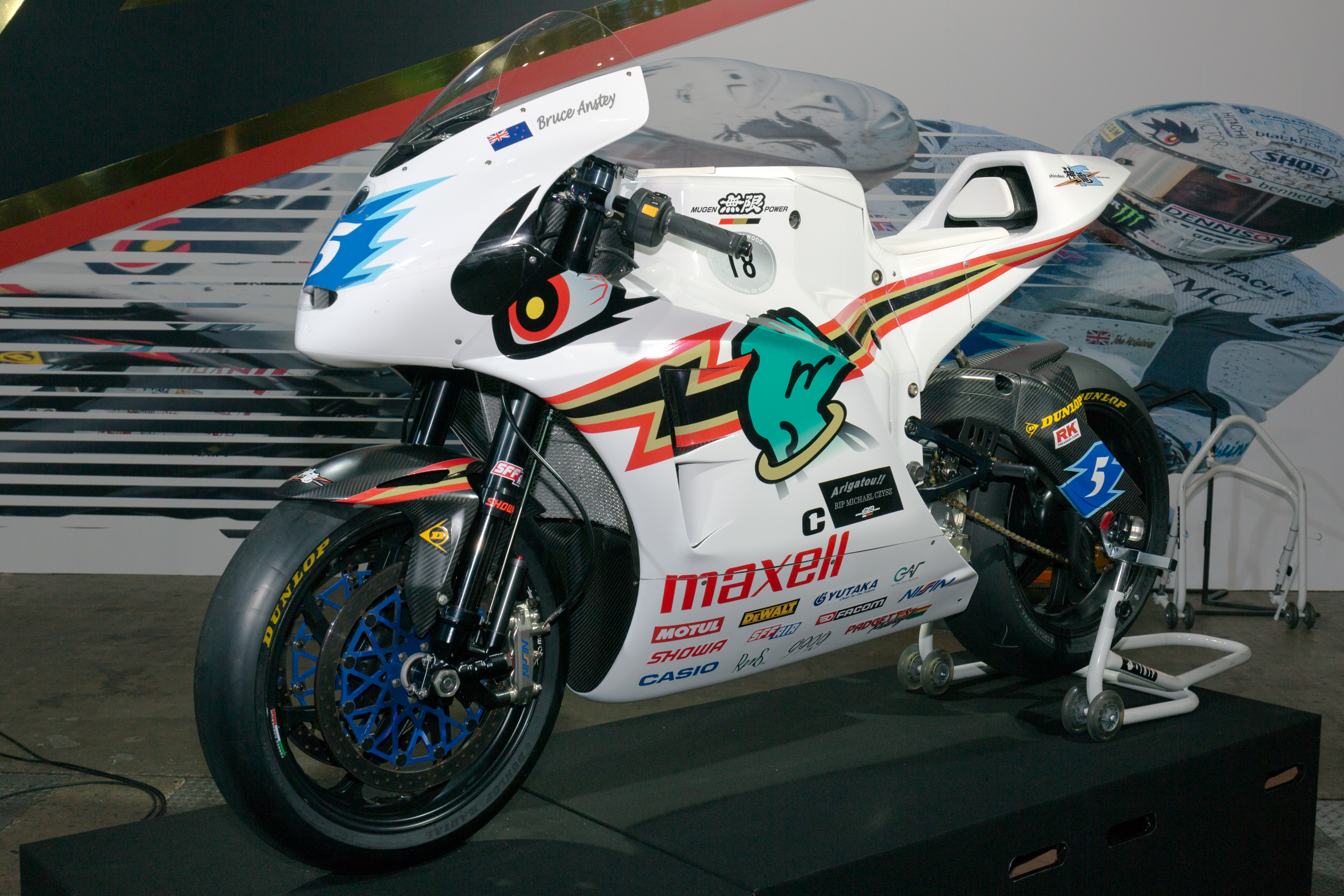
2017 Mugen Shinden Go

Anstey and Guy Martin came first and second respectively, both riding Mugen machines.

2018

The Mugen motorcycles achieved first and third place with Michael Rutter and Lee Johnston respectively, split by Daley Mathison riding for the University of Nottingham. Rutter broke the 120 mph barrier to set a new lap record of 121.824 mph (196.057 km/h).

2019

Mugen achieved their sixth consecutive victory with Michael Rutter again increasing the lap record average speed to 121.91 mph. John McGuinness followed his team-mate home to complete a 1-2 finish for the team.

== Vehicles ==
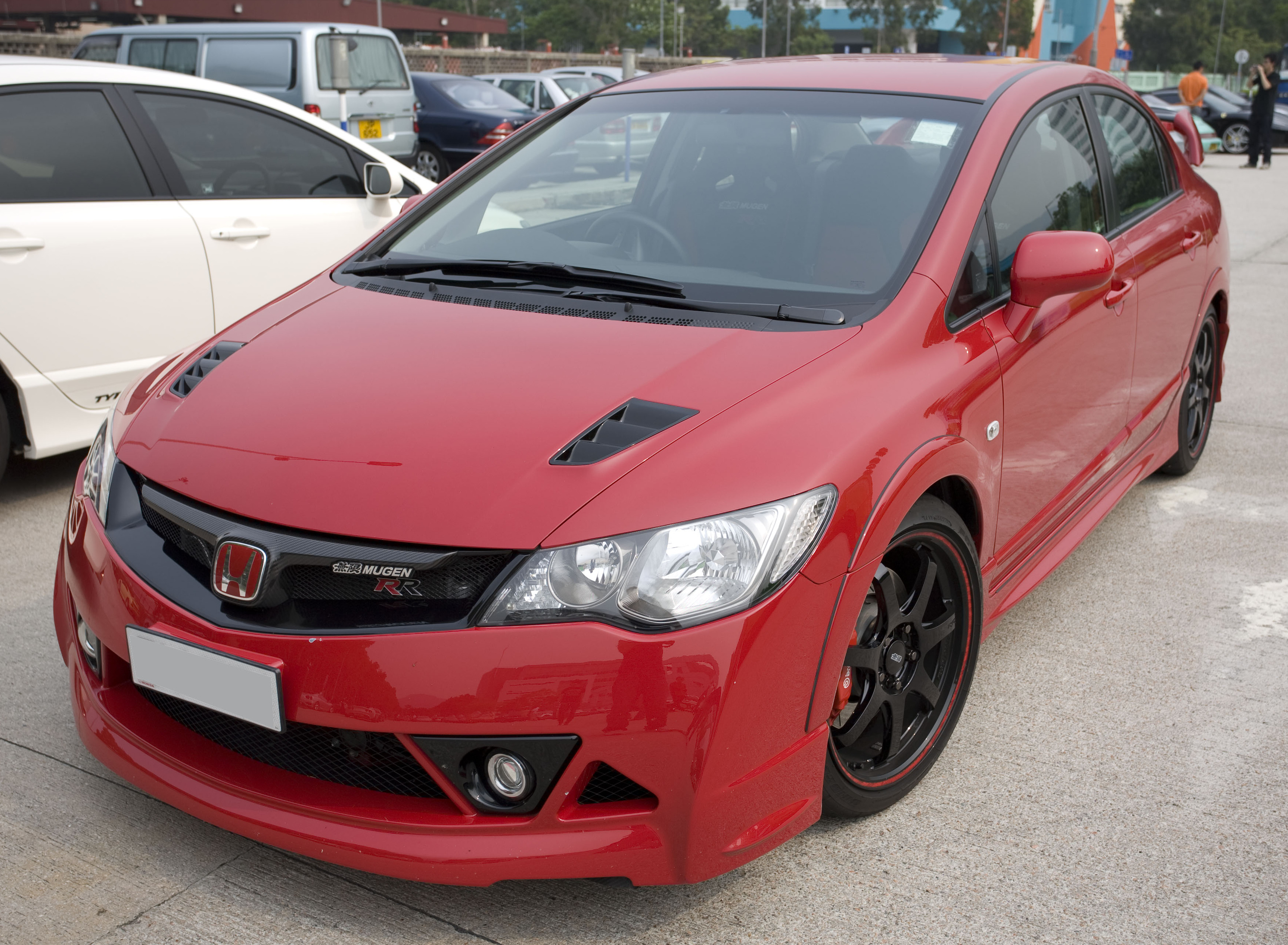
Honda Civic Mugen RR (2007)

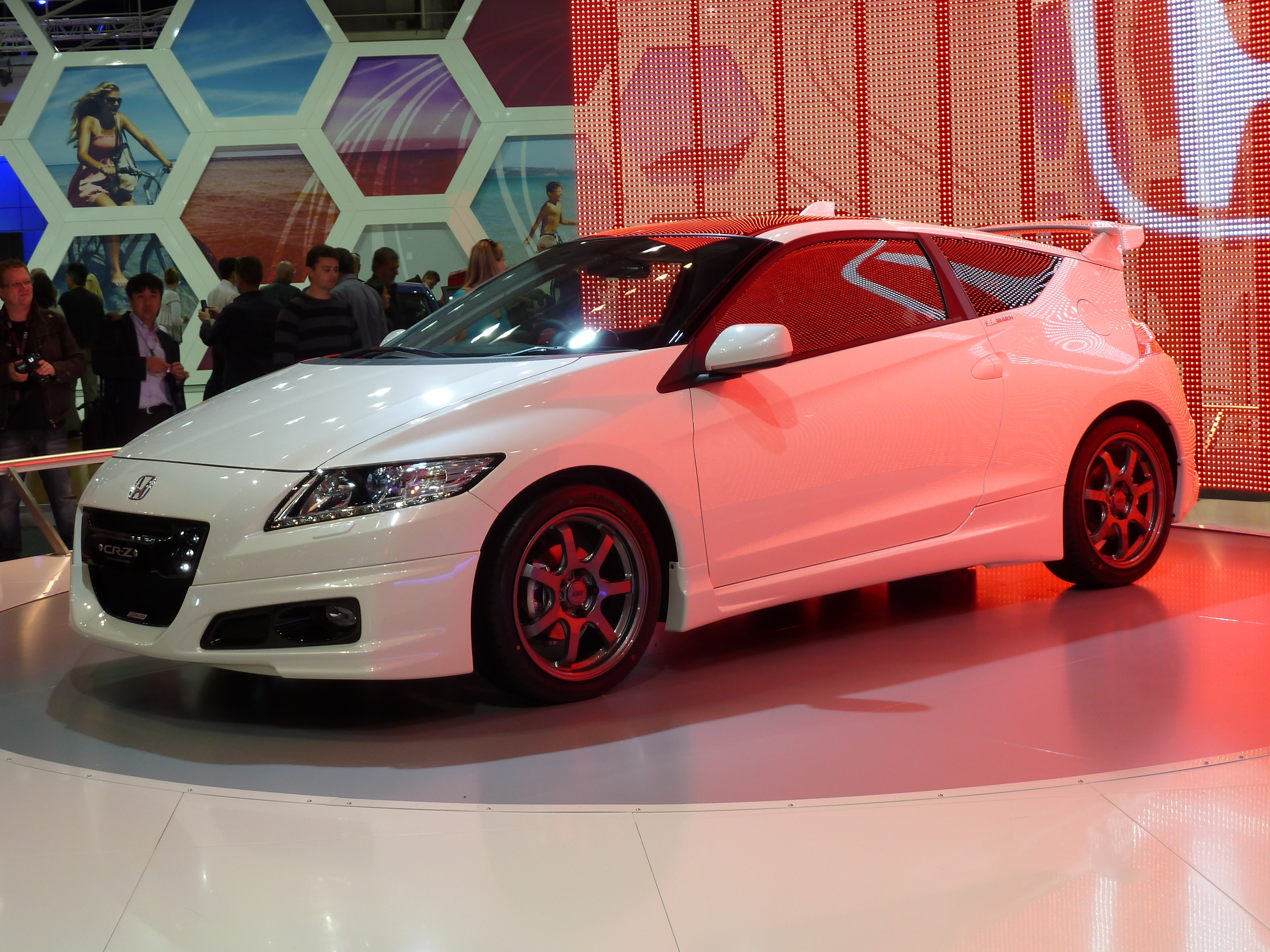
Honda CR-Z Mugen (2010)

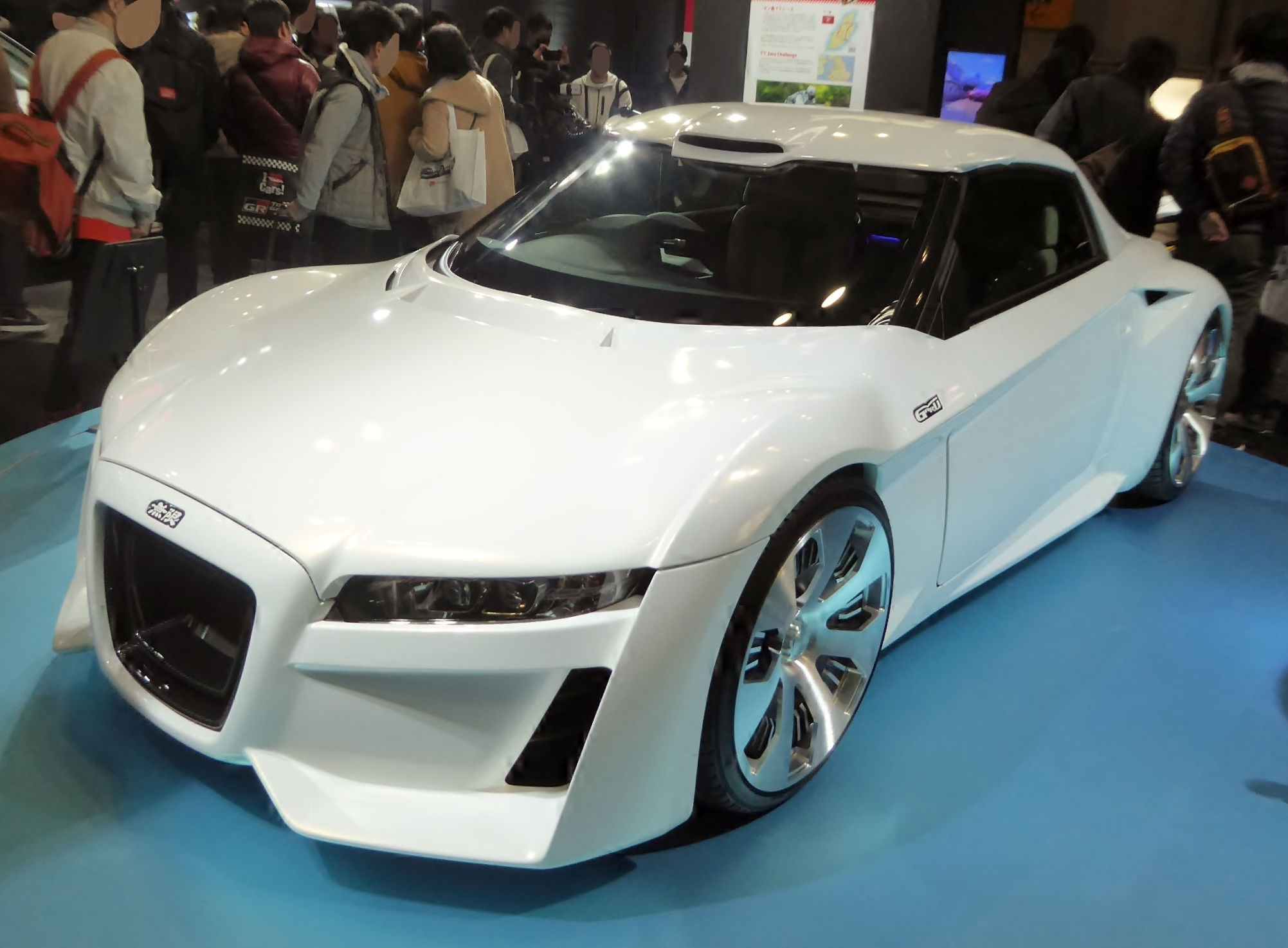
Mugen Garu concept, based on the Honda S660, at the 2017 Osaka Auto Messe

M-Tec has also built concept Honda vehicles, using the company's own performance parts. Some models (e.g.: Mugen Civic RR) are also sold in Japanese domestic market. Mugen also sells individual parts for newer vehicles that includes the 2017-2021 Civic Type-R (FK8), as well as 2016-2021 Civic Hatchback (FK7). These parts include aerodynamic body parts such as front lips, rear diffusers, and wings. This also goes for earlier gen vehicles, and is typically well known to be sought as an OEM aftermarket purchases for countries such as the U.S that do not receive Mugen produced vehicles like in Japan.

=== List of Mugen vehicles ===
- Honda Stepwgn
- Honda City Turbo I and II
- 1984 Mugen Honda CR-X
- 1991-1996 Mugen Honda Beat
- 1992-1995 Honda Civic SiR I and II Mugen (hatchback model and sedan model)
- 1996-2001 Honda Integra Type R Mugen
- 1994-1997 Acura/Honda Integra Mugen (bugeye version)
- 1997 Mugen CR-X del Sol
- 2000 Honda Prelude
- Dc5 Honda Integra
- 1996-2000 Honda Civic SiR Mugen hatchback coupe and sedan model
- 2004 Honda Fit Dynamite
- 2005 Honda Legend Max
- 2006 Honda Fit Spec.D
- 2006 Honda Civic Dominator
- the Road to Racing Concept (Honda Civic-based) (2007)
- Open-Top Pure Sports Concept (Honda S2000-based) (2007)
- Mugen Courage LC70 (Japan Le Mans Challenge LMP-1) (2007)
- Mugen S2000 (2008)
- Honda Fit F154SC (2008)
- Mugen RR Experimental Spec. (Honda Civic Type R-based) (2008)
- Honda Civic 5D MUGEN (2008)
- Honda NSX Mugen RR (2009)
- Honda Civic Mugen RR Advanced Concept (2009)
- Honda Accord Mugen 24sc (2009)
- Honda Odyssey Mugen (2009)
- Honda Insight ZE2 (Mugen Zero-Lift) (2010)
- Honda CR-Z: RR Concept (2012)
- Honda CBR1000RR
- Honda City ZX 2009

=== Production vehicles ===
- 2008 Civic Mugen Si marketed in North America
- 2007 Civic Mugen RR marketed in Japan
- CR-Z Mugen
- Accord Mugen

== Formula One statistics ==
| Year | Team | GPs | Wins | Pole position | Podiums | Fastest laps | Points |
|---|---|---|---|---|---|---|---|
| 1992 | Footwork-Mugen Honda | 16 | 0 | 0 | 0 | 0 | 6 |
| 1993 | Footwork-Mugen Honda | 16 | 0 | 0 | 0 | 0 | 4 |
| 1994 | Lotus-Mugen Honda | 16 | 0 | 0 | 0 | 0 | 0 |
| 1995 | Ligier-Mugen Honda | 17 | 0 | 0 | 2 | 0 | 24 |
| 1996 | Ligier-Mugen Honda | 16 | 1 | 0 | 1 | 0 | 15 |
| 1997 | Prost-Mugen Honda | 17 | 0 | 0 | 2 | 0 | 21 |
| 1998 | Jordan-Mugen Honda | 16 | 1 | 0 | 3 | 0 | 34 |
| 1999 | Jordan-Mugen Honda | 16 | 2 | 1 | 6 | 0 | 61 |
| 2000 | Jordan-Mugen Honda | 17 | 0 | 0 | 2 | 0 | 17 |

== Complete Formula One results ==
(key) (results in bold indicate pole position)

| Year | Entrant | Chassis | Engine(s) | Drivers | 1 | 2 | 3 | 4 | 5 | 6 | 7 | 8 | 9 | 10 | 11 | 12 | 13 | 14 | 15 | 16 | 17 | Points | WCC |
|---|---|---|---|---|---|---|---|---|---|---|---|---|---|---|---|---|---|---|---|---|---|---|---|
| 1992 | Footwork Mugen Honda | Footwork FA13 | MF-351H 3.5 V10 | | RSA | MEX | BRA | ESP | SMR | MON | CAN | FRA | GBR | GER | HUN | BEL | ITA | POR | JPN | AUS | | 6 | 7th |
| 1992 | Footwork Mugen Honda | Footwork FA13 | MF-351H 3.5 V10 | (Italy) Michele Alboreto | 10 | 13 | 6 | 5 | 5 | 7 | 7 | 7 | 7 | 9 | 7 | Ret | 7 | 6 | 15 | Ret | | 6 | 7th |
| 1992 | Footwork Mugen Honda | Footwork FA13 | MF-351H 3.5 V10 | (Japan) Aguri Suzuki | 8 | DNQ | Ret | 7 | 10 | 11 | DNQ | Ret | 12 | Ret | Ret | 9 | Ret | 10 | 8 | 8 | | 6 | 7th |
| 1993 | Footwork Mugen Honda | Footwork FA13B; Footwork FA14 | MF-351 HB 3.5 V10 | | RSA | BRA | EUR | SMR | ESP | MON | CAN | FRA | GBR | GER | HUN | BEL | ITA | POR | JPN | AUS | | 4 | 9th |
| 1993 | Footwork Mugen Honda | Footwork FA13B; Footwork FA14 | MF-351 HB 3.5 V10 | (United Kingdom) Derek Warwick | 7 | 9 | Ret | Ret | 13 | Ret | 16 | 13 | 6 | 17 | 4 | Ret | Ret | 15 | 14 | 10 | | 4 | 9th |
| 1993 | Footwork Mugen Honda | Footwork FA13B; Footwork FA14 | MF-351 HB 3.5 V10 | (Japan) Aguri Suzuki | Ret | Ret | Ret | 9 | 10 | Ret | 13 | 12 | Ret | Ret | Ret | Ret | Ret | Ret | Ret | 7 | | 4 | 9th |
| 1994 | Team Lotus | Lotus 107C | MF-351 HC 3.5 V10; MF-351 HD 3.5 V10 | | BRA | PAC | SMR | MON | ESP | CAN | FRA | GBR | GER | HUN | BEL | ITA | POR | EUR | JPN | AUS | | 0 | NC |
| 1994 | Team Lotus | Lotus 107C | MF-351 HC 3.5 V10; MF-351 HD 3.5 V10 | (Portugal) Pedro Lamy | 10 | 8 | Ret | 11 | | | | | | | | | | | | | | 0 | NC |
| 1994 | Team Lotus | Lotus 107C | MF-351 HC 3.5 V10; MF-351 HD 3.5 V10 | (Italy) Alessandro Zanardi | | | | | 9 | 15 | | | | | | | | | | | | 0 | NC |
| 1994 | Team Lotus | Lotus 107C | MF-351 HC 3.5 V10; MF-351 HD 3.5 V10 | (United Kingdom) Johnny Herbert | 7 | 7 | 10 | Ret | | | | | | | | | | | | | | 0 | NC |
| 1994 | Team Lotus | Lotus 109 | MF-351 HC 3.5 V10; MF-351 HD 3.5 V10 | (United Kingdom) Johnny Herbert | | | | | Ret | 8 | 7 | 11 | Ret | Ret | 12 | Ret | 13 | | | | | 0 | NC |
| 1994 | Team Lotus | Lotus 109 | MF-351 HC 3.5 V10; MF-351 HD 3.5 V10 | (Italy) Alessandro Zanardi | | | | | | | Ret | Ret | Ret | 13 | | Ret | | 16 | 13 | Ret | | 0 | NC |
| 1994 | Team Lotus | Lotus 109 | MF-351 HC 3.5 V10; MF-351 HD 3.5 V10 | (Belgium) Philippe Adams | | | | | | | | | | | Ret | | 16 | | | | | 0 | NC |
| 1994 | Team Lotus | Lotus 109 | MF-351 HC 3.5 V10; MF-351 HD 3.5 V10 | (France) Éric Bernard | | | | | | | | | | | | | | 18 | | | | 0 | NC |
| 1994 | Team Lotus | Lotus 109 | MF-351 HC 3.5 V10; MF-351 HD 3.5 V10 | (Finland) Mika Salo | | | | | | | | | | | | | | | 10 | Ret | | 0 | NC |
| 1995 | Ligier Gitanes Blondes | Ligier JS41 | MF-301 3.0 V10 | | BRA | ARG | SMR | ESP | MON | CAN | FRA | GBR | GER | HUN | BEL | ITA | POR | EUR | PAC | JPN | AUS | 24 | 5th |
| 1995 | Ligier Gitanes Blondes | Ligier JS41 | MF-301 3.0 V10 | (United Kingdom) Martin Brundle | | | | 9 | Ret | 10 | 4 | Ret | | Ret | 3 | Ret | 8 | 7 | | | Ret | 24 | 5th |
| 1995 | Ligier Gitanes Blondes | Ligier JS41 | MF-301 3.0 V10 | (Japan) Aguri Suzuki | 8 | Ret | 11 | | | | | | 6 | | | | | | Ret | DNS | | 24 | 5th |
| 1995 | Ligier Gitanes Blondes | Ligier JS41 | MF-301 3.0 V10 | (France) Olivier Panis | Ret | 7 | 9 | 6 | Ret | 4 | 8 | 4 | Ret | 6 | 9 | Ret | Ret | Ret | 8 | 5 | 2 | 24 | 5th |
| 1996 | Ligier Gauloises Blondes | Ligier JS43 | MF-301 HA 3.0 V10 | | AUS | BRA | ARG | EUR | SMR | MON | ESP | CAN | FRA | GBR | GER | HUN | BEL | ITA | POR | JPN | | 15 | 6th |
| 1996 | Ligier Gauloises Blondes | Ligier JS43 | MF-301 HA 3.0 V10 | (France) Olivier Panis | 7 | 6 | 8 | Ret | Ret | 1 | Ret | Ret | 7 | Ret | 7 | 5 | Ret | Ret | 10 | 7 | | 15 | 6th |
| 1996 | Ligier Gauloises Blondes | Ligier JS43 | MF-301 HA 3.0 V10 | (Brazil) Pedro Diniz | 10 | 8 | Ret | 10 | 7 | Ret | 6 | Ret | Ret | Ret | Ret | Ret | Ret | 6 | Ret | Ret | | 15 | 6th |
| 1997 | Prost Gauloises Blondes | Prost JS45 | MF-301 HB 3.0 V10 | | AUS | BRA | ARG | SMR | MON | ESP | CAN | FRA | GBR | GER | HUN | BEL | ITA | AUT | LUX | JPN | EUR | 21 | 6th |
| 1997 | Prost Gauloises Blondes | Prost JS45 | MF-301 HB 3.0 V10 | (France) Olivier Panis | 5 | 3 | Ret | 8 | 4 | 2 | 11 | | | | | | | | 6 | Ret | 7 | 21 | 6th |
| 1997 | Prost Gauloises Blondes | Prost JS45 | MF-301 HB 3.0 V10 | (Italy) Jarno Trulli | | | | | | | | 10 | 8 | 4 | 7 | 15 | 10 | Ret | | | | 21 | 6th |
| 1997 | Prost Gauloises Blondes | Prost JS45 | MF-301 HB 3.0 V10 | (Japan) Shinji Nakano | 7 | 14 | Ret | Ret | Ret | Ret | 6 | Ret | 11 | 7 | 6 | Ret | 11 | Ret | Ret | Ret | 10 | 21 | 6th |
| 1998 | Benson and Hedges Jordan | Jordan 198 | MF-301 HC 3.0 V10 | | AUS | BRA | ARG | SMR | ESP | MON | CAN | FRA | GBR | AUT | GER | HUN | BEL | ITA | LUX | JPN | | 34 | 4th |
| 1998 | Benson and Hedges Jordan | Jordan 198 | MF-301 HC 3.0 V10 | (United Kingdom) Damon Hill | 8 | DSQ | 8 | 10 | Ret | 8 | Ret | Ret | Ret | 7 | 4 | 4 | 1 | 6 | 9 | 4 | | 34 | 4th |
| 1998 | Benson and Hedges Jordan | Jordan 198 | MF-301 HC 3.0 V10 | (Germany) Ralf Schumacher | Ret | Ret | Ret | 7 | 11 | Ret | Ret | 16 | 6 | 5 | 6 | 9 | 2 | 3 | Ret | Ret | | 34 | 4th |
| 1999 | Benson and Hedges Jordan | Jordan 199 | MF-301 HD 3.0 V10 | | AUS | BRA | SMR | MON | ESP | CAN | FRA | GBR | AUT | GER | HUN | BEL | ITA | EUR | MAL | JPN | | **61** | **3rd** |
| 1999 | Benson and Hedges Jordan | Jordan 199 | MF-301 HD 3.0 V10 | (United Kingdom) Damon Hill | Ret | Ret | 4 | Ret | 7 | Ret | Ret | 5 | 8 | Ret | 6 | 6 | 10 | Ret | Ret | Ret | | **61** | **3rd** |
| 1999 | Benson and Hedges Jordan | Jordan 199 | MF-301 HD 3.0 V10 | (Germany) Heinz-Harald Frentzen | 2 | 3 | Ret | 4 | Ret | 11 | 1 | 4 | 4 | 3 | 4 | 3 | 1 | **Ret** | 6 | 4 | | **61** | **3rd** |
| 2000 | Benson and Hedges Jordan | Jordan EJ10; Jordan EJ10B | MF-301 HE 3.0 V10 | | AUS | BRA | SMR | GBR | ESP | EUR | MON | CAN | FRA | AUT | GER | HUN | BEL | ITA | USA | JPN | MAL | 17 | 6th |
| 2000 | Benson and Hedges Jordan | Jordan EJ10; Jordan EJ10B | MF-301 HE 3.0 V10 | (Germany) Heinz-Harald Frentzen | Ret | 3 | Ret | 17 | 6 | Ret | 10 | Ret | 7 | Ret | Ret | 6 | 6 | Ret | 3 | Ret | Ret | 17 | 6th |
| 2000 | Benson and Hedges Jordan | Jordan EJ10; Jordan EJ10B | MF-301 HE 3.0 V10 | (Italy) Jarno Trulli | Ret | 4 | 15 | 6 | 12 | Ret | Ret | 6 | 6 | Ret | 9 | 7 | Ret | Ret | Ret | 13 | 12 | 17 | 6th |

== Formula Nippon/Super Formula results ==
=== Complete Japanese Top Formula racing results ===
(key) (Races in bold indicate pole position) (Races in italics indicate fastest lap)

| Year | Chassis | Engine | Tyres | No. | Drivers | 1 | 2 | 3 | 4 | 5 | 6 | 7 | 8 | 9 | 10 | 11 | 12 | D.C. | Pts | T.C. | Pts |
Formula Nippon
| 2010 | Swift 017.n | Honda HR10E | B | 16 | (Japan) Yuji Ide | SUZ; 9 | MOT; 9 | FUJ; 10 | MOT; 9 | SUG; 9 | AUT; DNS | SUZ; 8 | SUZ; 8 | FUJ‡ 4 | FUJ‡ 3 | | | 14th | 1 | 10th | 1 |
| 2011 | Swift 017.n | Honda HR10E | B | 16 | (Japan) Naoki Yamamoto | **SUZ**; Ret | AUT; 5 | FUJ; 9 | MOT; 14 | SUZ; C | SUG; 11 | MOT; 12 | MOT; NC | FUJ‡ 8 | | | | 11th | 5 | 7th | 4 |
| 2012 | Swift 017.n | Honda HR12E | B | 15 | (Japan) Takuma Sato | SUZ | MOT | AUT | FUJ | MOT | SUG; 9 | SUZ; 17 | SUZ; 10 | FUJ‡ 13 | | | | 15th | 0 | 8th | 4 |
| 2012 | Swift 017.n | Honda HR12E | B | 16 | (Japan) Naoki Yamamoto | SUZ; 7 | MOT; 7 | AUT; 9 | FUJ; 12 | MOT; Ret | SUG; 14 | SUZ; 15 | SUZ; Ret | FUJ‡ 8 | | | | 11th | 4 | 8th | 4 |
Super Formula
| 2013 | Swift SF13 | Honda HR12E | B | 15 | (Japan) Takuma Sato | SUZ; 15 | | | | SUG; 11 | SUZ; 9 | SUZ; 8 | FUJ‡ 14 | | | | | 18th | 0.5 | 4th | 32.5 |
| 2013 | Swift SF13 | Honda HR12E | B | 15 | (Japan) Takashi Kobayashi | | AUT; Ret | FUJ; 15 | MOT; 17 | | | | | | | | | 22nd | 0 | 4th | 32.5 |
| 2013 | Swift SF13 | Honda HR12E | B | 16 | (Japan) Naoki Yamamoto | SUZ; 4 | AUT; 3 | FUJ; 3 | MOT; 8 | SUG; 3 | **SUZ**; 1 | **SUZ**; 3 | FUJ‡ 5 | | | | | 1st | 37 | 4th | 32.5 |
| 2014 | Dallara SF14 | Honda HR-414E | B | 1 | (Japan) Naoki Yamamoto | SUZ; 11 | FUJ; Ret | FUJ; 5 | FUJ; 5 | MOT; 15 | **AUT**; 7 | **SUG**; 7 | SUZ; 7 | SUZ; 6 | | | | 9th | 14.5 | 7th | 12.5 |
| 2014 | Dallara SF14 | Honda HR-414E | B | 2 | (Japan) Yuhki Nakayama | SUZ; 12 | FUJ; 12 | FUJ; 18 | FUJ; 13 | MOT; 12 | AUT; 14 | SUG; 14 | SUZ; Ret | SUZ; 17 | | | | 20th | 0 | 7th | 12.5 |
| 2015 | Dallara SF14 | Honda HR-414E | B | 15 | (Switzerland) Fabio Leimer | SUZ | OKA | FUJ | MOT | AUT | SUG | SUZ | SUZ | | | | | N/A | N/A | 6th | 21 |
| 2015 | Dallara SF14 | Honda HR-414E | B | 16 | (Japan) Naoki Yamamoto | **SUZ**; 15 | OKA; 4 | FUJ; 12 | MOT; 8 | AUT; 7 | SUG; 2 | SUZ; 14 | **SUZ**; 1 | | | | | 5th | 26 | 6th | 21 |
| 2016 | Dallara SF14 | Honda HR-414E | Y | 16 | (Japan) Naoki Yamamoto | **SUZ**; 1 | OKA; 5 | FUJ; Ret | MOT; 8 | OKA; 10 | OKA; 6 | SUG; 14 | SUZ; 19 | SUZ; Ret | | | | 8th | 15.5 | 6th | 14.5 |
| 2017 | Dallara SF14 | Honda HR-414E | Y | 15 | (France) Pierre Gasly | SUZ; 10 | OKA; 19 | OKA; 7 | FUJ; 5 | MOT; 1 | AUT; 1 | SUG; 2 | SUZ; C | SUZ; C | | | | 2nd | 33 | 2nd | 43.5 |
| 2017 | Dallara SF14 | Honda HR-414E | Y | 16 | (Japan) Naoki Yamamoto | SUZ; 2 | OKA; 5 | OKA; 8 | FUJ; Ret | MOT; 13 | AUT; 16 | SUG; 18 | SUZ; C | SUZ; C | | | | 9th | 10.5 | 2nd | 43.5 |
| 2018 | Dallara SF14 | Honda HR-414E | Y | 15 | (Japan) Nirei Fukuzumi | SUZ; Ret | | | | MOT; 17 | OKA; 18 | SUZ; 12 | | | | | | 20th | 0 | 2nd | 36 |
| 2018 | Dallara SF14 | Honda HR-414E | Y | 15 | (Japan) Sena Sakaguchi | | AUT; C | | | | | | | | | | | - | 0 | 2nd | 36 |
| 2018 | Dallara SF14 | Honda HR-414E | Y | 15 | (United Kingdom) Dan Ticktum | | | SUG; Ret | FUJ; 11 | | | | | | | | | 19th | 0 | 2nd | 36 |
| 2018 | Dallara SF14 | Honda HR-414E | Y | 16 | (Japan) Naoki Yamamoto | **SUZ**; 1 | AUT; C | SUG; 1 | FUJ; 8 | MOT; 7 | OKA; 10 | **SUZ**; 1 | | | | | | 1st | 38 | 2nd | 36 |
| 2019 | Dallara SF19 | Honda HR-414E | Y | 15 | (United Kingdom) Dan Ticktum | SUZ; 8 | AUT; Ret | SUG; 15 | | | | | | | | | | 20th | 1 | 5th | 25 |
| 2019 | Dallara SF19 | Honda HR-414E | Y | 15 | (Mexico) Patricio O'Ward | | | | FUJ; 14 | MOT; 14 | OKA; 6 | | | | | | | 18th | 3 | 5th | 25 |
| 2019 | Dallara SF19 | Honda HR-414E | Y | 15 | (Estonia) Jüri Vips | | | | | | | SUZ; 18 | | | | | | 23rd | 0 | 5th | 25 |
| 2019 | Dallara SF19 | Honda HR-414E | Y | 16 | (Japan) Tomoki Nojiri | SUZ; 4 | AUT; 18 | SUG; Ret | FUJ; 4 | MOT; 8 | OKA; 9 | SUZ; 1 | | | | | | 4th | 24 | 5th | 25 |
| 2020 | Dallara SF19 | Honda HR-414E | Y | 15 | (Japan) Ukyo Sasahara | MOT; 11 | OKA; 13 | SUG; Ret | AUT; 14 | SUZ; Ret | SUZ; 11 | FUJ; 7 | | | | | | 18th | 5 | 7th | 42 |
| 2020 | Dallara SF19 | Honda HR-414E | Y | 16 | (Japan) Tomoki Nojiri | MOT; 7 | OKA; 10 | SUG; 4 | AUT; 1 | SUZ; 7 | SUZ; 5 | FUJ; Ret | | | | | | 5th | 47 | 7th | 42 |
| 2021 | Dallara SF19 | Honda HR-414E | Y | 15 | (Japan) Hiroki Otsu | FUJ; 16 | SUZ; 5 | AUT; 6 | SUG; 10 | MOT; 10 | **MOT**; 1 | SUZ; 5 | | | | | | 6th | 38.5 | 7th | 35.5 |
| 2021 | Dallara SF19 | Honda HR-414E | Y | 16 | (Japan) Tomoki Nojiri | **FUJ**; 1 | SUZ; 1 | AUT; 5 | SUG; 6 | **MOT**; 1 | MOT; 5 | SUZ; 3 | | | | | | 1st | 86 | 3rd | 77 |
| 2022 | Dallara SF19 | Honda HR-414E | Y | 1 | (Japan) Tomoki Nojiri | FUJ; 2 | **FUJ**; 1 | **SUZ**; 2 | **AUT**; 4 | **SUG**; 3 | FUJ; 3 | MOT; 3 | MOT; 4 | **SUZ**; 2 | **SUZ**; 1 | | | 1st | 154 | 1st | 187 |
| 2022 | Dallara SF19 | Honda HR-414E | Y | 15 | (Japan) Ukyo Sasahara | **FUJ**; 19 | FUJ; 10 | SUZ; 14 | AUT; 7 | SUG; 10 | FUJ; 1 | MOT; 7 | **MOT**; 8 | SUZ; 1 | SUZ; 17 | | | 6th | 57 | 1st | 187 |
| 2023 | Dallara SF23 | Honda HR-417E | Y | 1 | (Japan) Tomoki Nojiri | **FUJ**; 2 | **FUJ**; 1 | SUZ; Ret | | SUG; 2 | FUJ; 8 | **MOT**; 1 | **SUZ**; 1 | SUZ; 4 | | | | 3rd | 106 | 1st | 188.5 |
| 2023 | Dallara SF23 | Honda HR-417E | Y | 1 | (Japan) Hiroki Otsu | | | | AUT; 14 | | | | | | | | | 24th | 0 | 1st | 188.5 |
| 2023 | Dallara SF23 | Honda HR-417E | Y | 15 | (New Zealand) Liam Lawson | FUJ; 1 | FUJ; 5 | SUZ; 4 | AUT; 1 | SUG; 5 | FUJ; 1 | MOT; 13 | SUZ; 6 | **SUZ**; 2 | | | | 2nd | 106.5 | 1st | 188.5 |
| 2024 | Dallara SF23 | Honda HR-417E | Y | 15 | (Japan) Ayumu Iwasa | SUZ; 9 | **AUT**; 2 | SUG; 2 | FUJ; 11 | MOT; 7 | FUJ; 2 | FUJ; 6 | SUZ; 9 | SUZ; 7 | | | | 5th | 63.5 | 2nd | 131.5 |
| 2024 | Dallara SF23 | Honda HR-417E | Y | 16 | (Japan) Tomoki Nojiri | SUZ; 1 | AUT; 9 | **SUG**; 1 | FUJ; 3 | MOT; 3 | FUJ; 6 | FUJ; 7 | SUZ; 5 | **SUZ**; 4 | | | | 2nd | 87 | 2nd | 131.5 |
| 2025 | Dallara SF23 | Honda HR-417E | Y | 15 | (Japan) Ayumu Iwasa | SUZ; 2 | SUZ; 3 | MOT; Ret | MOT; 3 | AUT; Ret | FUJ; 3 | FUJ; 2 | **SUG**; 1 | FUJ; 21 | **SUZ**; Ret | SUZ; 4 | **SUZ**; 1 | 1st | 124 | 2nd | 188.5 |
| 2025 | Dallara SF23 | Honda HR-417E | Y | 16 | (Japan) Tomoki Nojiri | **SUZ**; 7 | **SUZ**; 4 | MOT; 9 | MOT; 10 | **AUT**; 2 | **FUJ**; 2 | FUJ; 12 | SUG; 15 | FUJ; 3 | SUZ; 1 | SUZ; 5 | SUZ; 10 | 5th | 94.5 | 2nd | 188.5 |

== JGTC/Super GT results ==
=== Japanese Grand Touring Championship (JGTC) ===
(key) (Races in bold indicate pole position) (Races in italics indicate fastest lap)

| Year | Car | Tyres | Class | No. | Drivers | 1 | 2 | 3 | 4 | 5 | 6 | 7 | 8 | 9 | Pos | Pts |
|---|---|---|---|---|---|---|---|---|---|---|---|---|---|---|---|---|
| 1997 | Honda NSX | B | GT500 | 18 | (Japan) Takuya Kurosawa (Japan) Katsumi Yamamoto | SUZ | FUJ; Ret | SEN; Ret | FUJ; Ret | **MIN**; 8 | SUG; 5 | NC1; 8 | NC2; 9 | | 9th | 11 |
| 1998 | Honda NSX | B | GT500 | 16 | (Japan) Ryō Michigami (Japan) Osamu Nakako | SUZ; Ret | FUJ; C | **SEN**; Ret | FUJ; 5 | **MOT**; 1 | MIN; 11 | **SUG**; 1 | NC1; 7 | | 5th | 48 |
| 1998 | Honda NSX | B | GT500 | 18 | (Japan) Katsutomo Kaneishi (Japan) Katsumi Yamamoto (Japan) Juichi Wakisaka | SUZ; Ret | FUJ; C | SEN; Ret | FUJ; 4 | MOT; Ret | MIN; 15 | SUG; DSQ | NC1; Ret | | 12th | 10 |
| 1999 | Honda NSX | B | GT500 | 16 | (Japan) Ryō Michigami (Japan) Osamu Nakako | SUZ; 14 | FUJ; 12 | SUG; 3 | MIN; 3 | FUJ; 9 | OKA; 16 | MOT; 4 | NC1; 5 | | 3rd | 81 |
| 1999 | Honda NSX | B | GT500 | 18 | (Japan) Katsutomo Kaneishi (Japan) Juichi Wakisaka | **SUZ**; 1 | FUJ; Ret | SUG; Ret | MIN; 11 | FUJ; 2 | OKA; 3 | MOT; Ret | NC1; Ret | | 3rd | 81 |
| 2000 | Honda NSX | B | GT500 | 16 | (Japan) Ryō Michigami (Japan) Osamu Nakako (Japan) Hidetoshi Mitsusada | MOT; 2 | FUJ; 8 | SUG; 2 | NC1; 10 | FUJ; 10 | OKA; 2 | MIN; 4 | SUZ; 2 | | 1st | 96 |
| 2000 | Honda NSX | B | GT500 | 18 | (Japan) Katsutomo Kaneishi (Japan) Juichi Wakisaka | **MOT**; Ret | **FUJ**; 1 | **SUG**; 4 | **NC1**; 2 | FUJ; 17 | OKA; 10 | **MIN**; 2 | SUZ; 15 | | 1st | 96 |
| 2001 | Honda NSX | B | GT500 | 1 | (Japan) Ryō Michigami (Japan) Hidetoshi Mitsusada | **OKA**; 1 | FUJ; 8 | SUG; 4 | NC1; 5 | FUJ; 5 | MOT; 12 | SUZ; 2 | MIN; 12 | | 2nd | 68 |
| 2001 | Honda NSX | B | GT500 | 18 | (France) Sébastien Philippe (Japan) Hiroki Katoh (France) Benoît Tréluyer | OKA; 14 | FUJ; 15 | SUG; 6 | NC1; 2 | FUJ; 15 | MOT; 14 | SUZ; 12 | MIN; 3 | | 2nd | 68 |
| 2002 | Honda NSX | B | GT500 | 16 | (Japan) Daisuke Ito (Germany) Dominik Schwager (Japan) Ryō Michigami | OKA; 5 | FUJ; 3 | SUG; 3 | SEP; 10 | FUJ; 11 | MOT; 16 | MIN; 1 | SUZ; 10 | | 1st | 96 |
| 2002 | Honda NSX | B | GT500 | 18 | (United Kingdom) Richard Lyons (France) Sébastien Philippe | OKA; 2 | FUJ; 15 | SUG; 16 | SEP; 13 | FUJ; 6 | MOT; 1 | MIN; 12 | SUZ; 14 | | 1st | 96 |
| 2003 | Honda NSX | B | GT500 | 16 | (Japan) Daisuke Ito (Netherlands) Tom Coronel | OKA; 4 | FUJ; Ret | SUG; 9 | FUJ; 12 | FUJ; 8 | MOT; 1 | AUT; 10 | SUZ; 11 | | 3rd | 77 |
| 2003 | Honda NSX | B | GT500 | 18 | (Japan) Ryō Michigami (France) Sébastien Philippe (Italy) Paolo Montin | OKA; 3 | FUJ; Ret | SUG; 7 | FUJ; 8 | FUJ; 1 | MOT; 14 | AUT; Ret | SUZ; 2 | | 3rd | 77 |
| 2004 | Honda NSX | D | GT300 | 16 | (Japan) Tetsuya Yamano (Japan) Hiroyuki Yagi (Japan) Haruki Kurosawa | **OKA**; 3 | SUG; 7 | SEP; 2 | TOK; 2 | MOT; 2 | AUT; 6 | SUZ; 1 | NC1; 1 | NC2; 2 | 1st | 93 |

=== Complete Super GT results ===
(key) (Races in bold indicate pole position) (Races in italics indicate fastest lap)

| Year | Car | Tyres | Class | No. | Drivers | 1 | 2 | 3 | 4 | 5 | 6 | 7 | 8 | 9 | 10 | 11 | Pos | Points |
|---|---|---|---|---|---|---|---|---|---|---|---|---|---|---|---|---|---|---|
| 2005 | Honda NSX | D | GT300 | 0 | (Japan) Shinya Hosokawa (Japan) Haruki Kurosawa | OKA; 3 | **FUJ**; 1 | SEP; 9 | **SUG**; 2 | MOT; 12 | **FUJ**; 1 | AUT; 7 | SUZ; 2 | | | | 2nd | 81 |
| 2012 | Honda CR-Z GT | B | GT300 | 16 | (Japan) Hideki Mutoh (Japan) Daisuke Nakajima | OKA | FUJ | SEP | SUG; 16 | SUZ; 11 | FUJ; 3 | AUT; 10 | MOT; 11 | NC1; 2 | NC2; 7 | | 14th | 23 |
| 2013 | Honda CR-Z GT | B | GT300 | 16 | (Japan) Hideki Mutoh (Japan) Yuhki Nakayama | OKA; 7 | FUJ; 2 | SEP; 2 | SUG; 2 | SUZ; 5 | FUJ; 8 | **FUJ**; 1 | AUT; 9 | MOT; 2 | NC1; 6 | NC2; 5 | 1st | 103 |
| 2014 | Honda CR-Z GT | B | GT300 | 0 | (Japan) Tomoki Nojiri (Japan) Yuhki Nakayama (Japan) Ryō Michigami | OKA; 9 | FUJ; 3 | AUT; 5 | SUG; 11 | FUJ; 18 | SUZ; 8 | BUR; 9 | MOT; 13 | | | | 9th | 44 |
| 2017 | Honda NSX GT500 | Y | GT500 | 16 | (Japan) Hideki Mutoh (Japan) Daisuke Nakajima (United Kingdom) Jenson Button | OKA; 9 | FUJ; 15 | AUT; 11 | SUG; 6 | FUJ; Ret | SUZ; 12 | CHA; 13 | MOT; 11 | | | | 15th | 20 |
| 2018 | Honda NSX GT500 | Y | GT500 | 16 | (Japan) Hideki Mutoh (Japan) Daisuke Nakajima | OKA; 10 | FUJ; 14 | SUZ; Ret | **CHA**; 5 | FUJ; 14 | SUG; 4 | AUT; 14 | MOT; 14 | | | | 14th | 31 |
| 2019 | Honda NSX GT500 | Y | GT500 | 16 | (Japan) Hideki Mutoh (Japan) Daisuke Nakajima | OKA; 7 | FUJ; 11 | SUZ; 12 | BUR; Ret | FUJ; 6 | AUT; 14 | SUG; 9 | MOT; 9 | NC1; 10 | NC2; 6 | | 15th | 28 |
| 2020 | Honda NSX GT500 | Y | GT500 | 16 | (Japan) Hideki Mutoh (Japan) Ukyo Sasahara | FUJ; 12 | FUJ; 10 | SUZ; Ret | MOT; 3 | FUJ; 6 | SUZ; 13 | MOT; 4 | FUJ; 12 | | | | 13th | 42 |
| 2021 | Honda NSX GT500 | D | GT500 | 16 | (Japan) Ukyo Sasahara (Japan) Toshiki Oyu | OKA; 11 | FUJ; 11 | MOT; 4 | SUZ; 9 | SUG; 9 | **AUT**; Ret | MOT; 5 | FUJ; 10 | | | | 14th | 40 |
| 2022 | Honda NSX GT500 | D | GT500 | 16 | (Japan) Ukyo Sasahara (Japan) Toshiki Oyu | OKA; 12 | FUJ; 10 | SUZ; 13 | FUJ; 13 | SUZ; 6 | SUG; 3 | AUT; 12 | MOT; 11 | | | | 13th | 35 |
| 2023 | Honda NSX GT500 | B | GT500 | 8 | (Japan) Tomoki Nojiri (Japan) Toshiki Oyu (Japan) Iori Kimura | OKA; 3 | FUJ; 11 | SUZ; 12 | FUJ; 14 | SUZ; 14 | **SUG**; 1 | AUT; Ret | MOT; 5 | | | | 9th | 54 |
| 2023 | Honda NSX GT500 | B | GT500 | 16 | (Japan) Nirei Fukuzumi (Japan) Hiroki Otsu | OKA; 11 | FUJ; 10 | SUZ; 7 | FUJ; 3 | **SUZ**; 1 | SUG; 12 | **AUT**; 2 | MOT; 12 | | | | 4th | 73 |
| 2024 | Honda Civic Type R-GT | B | GT500 | 8 | (Japan) Tomoki Nojiri (Japan) Nobuharu Matsushita | OKA; 8 | FUJ; 14 | SUZ; Ret | FUJ; 1 | SUG; 15 | AUT; 11 | MOT; 2 | SUZ; 12 | | | | 9th | 55 |
| 2024 | Honda Civic Type R-GT | B | GT500 | 16 | (Japan) Hiroki Otsu (Japan) Ren Sato | OKA; 9 | FUJ; 15 | SUZ; 3 | FUJ; 11 | SUG; 10 | AUT; 6 | MOT; 4 | SUZ; 5 | | | | 10th | 54 |
| 2025 | Honda Civic Type R-GT | B | GT500 | 8 | (Japan) Tomoki Nojiri (Japan) Nobuharu Matsushita | OKA; 7 | FUJ; 9 | SEP; 2 | FS1; 10 | FS2; 11 | SUZ; 11 | SUG; 8 | AUT; 10 | MOT; 6 | | | 8th | 54.5 |
| 2025 | Honda Civic Type R-GT | B | GT500 | 16 | (Japan) Hiroki Otsu (Japan) Ren Sato | OKA; Ret | FUJ; 11 | SEP; 12 | FS1; 13 | FS2; 14 | **SUZ**; 4 | **SUG**; 4 | AUT; 3 | MOT; 8 | | | 9th | 50.5 |

Note: Non-championship (NC1, NC2) races are major races that do not count towards the championship.

== See also ==
- Honda in motorsport
- Red Bull Powertrains, the next time Honda pulled out from F1 its engines were taken over by RBPT instead of Mugen
