= Nobuhiko Kawamoto =

Japanese businessman

Nobuhiko Kawamoto (川本 信彦, Kawamoto Nobuhiko; born March 3, 1936) is a Japanese businessman and the CEO of Honda Motor from 1990 to 1998.

== Biography ==
After graduating from Tohoku University in 1963, he joined the Honda F1 team as a design engineer. After Honda pulled out of F1 after the 1968 season to focus on production vehicles, he returned to Japan and rose through the company's ranks. In this period, he helped design the front-wheeled 1972 Honda Civic, as well as the CVCC engine.

Eventually, he became head of Honda's Research and Design department. Under Kawamoto, Honda returned to motor racing, first with Formula 2 in 1981. The venture was a success, Ralt-Honda winning three consecutive Formula 2 titles between 1982 and 1984. Honda returned to Formula One in 1983, eventually winning six consecutive titles with Williams and McLaren.

Honda's motor racing success propelled Kawamoto to the top of the company, replacing Tadashi Kume as CEO of Honda in 1990. Kawamoto came in during a tumultuous time for the company, facing product stagnation and an overreliance on sedans and sport coupes while Honda was unrepresented in the fast-growing sport utility vehicles and minivan segments.

Following the death of Soichiro Honda in 1991, Japanese media reported in 1992 and 1993 that Honda was at serious risk of an unwanted and hostile takeover by Mitsubishi Motors, who at the time was a larger automaker by volume and flush with profits from their successful Pajero and Diamante.

Kawamoto acted quickly to change Honda's corporate culture, rushing through market-driven product development that resulted in recreational vehicles such as the Odyssey and the CR-V, and a decrease on vehicles that were popular with Honda's engineers but not with the buying public.

The most shocking change to Honda came when Kawamoto ended Honda's successful participation in Formula One after the 1992 season, citing costs in light of the takeover threat from Mitsubishi Motors as well as creating a more environmentally friendly company image. As CEO, he reorganised the business into three areas (automobile, motorcycle and power divisions). He also divided Honda's geographical focus into four areas: Japan, North America, Europe and Rest of the World, and granted each area more autonomy in sales and marketing, manufacturing and development. These changes paid off as Honda's profits grew from $540 million in Fiscal 1990 to $1.78 billion in Fiscal 1996, and North American sales jumped 9%.

Kawamoto also had a love of planes, from watching the Imperial Japanese Navy take off for bombing runs of China during World War II.

Kawamoto retired from Honda in 1998, replaced by Hiroyuki Yoshino. In December 1998, he was awarded an honorary knighthood (KBE) for "valuable contributions to improving relations between Britain and Japan".
