= Hirotoshi Honda =

Japanese businessman

Hirotoshi Honda 本田 博俊
- Born: 11 April 1942 (age 84); Hamamatsu, Japan
- Occupation: Engineering
- Known for: Co-Founder of Mugen Motorsports
- Parent(s): Soichiro Honda; Sachi Honda

Hirotoshi Honda (本田 博俊, Honda Hirotoshi; born 11 April 1942) is a Japanese businessman, engineer and the founder of Mugen Motorsports. He is the son of Soichiro Honda, founder of the Honda Motor Company.

== Tax evasion case ==
Japanese prosecutors had arrested Hirotoshi Honda in 2003, hours after prosecutors launched a criminal investigation into Mugen, which has business relations with Honda Motor Company, on suspicion of dodging ¥ 1 billion in corporate taxes. Norio Hirokawa, 60, the company's auditor, was also arrested over his alleged involvement in the tax evasion.

Prosecutors alleged that Hirotoshi Honda approved the transactions, although he has claimed he was also a victim and only signed the tax documents prepared by his auditor without knowing about the crime. Prosecutors suspect Mugen hid its income by moving funds to a company named MG Estate under machine lease and other fictitious transactions for three years through to December 2000. Since his arrest in 2003, Hirotoshi Honda had stepped down as the company president.

Hirotoshi Honda is a board member of MG Estate, which has since been renamed GE Seirijigyosha. Mugen reported sales of about ¥ 6.8 billion for the financial year to October 2001. Honda Motor has pulled its capital from Mugen but still teams with the firm to participate in auto races. All of Mugen's operations facilities and employees were handed over to M-TEC Company, set up by a relative of Soichiro Honda, while Mugen continued corporate existence only to participate in court proceedings.

On May 25, 2006, Hirotoshi Honda was found not guilty of charges of tax evasion, but Presiding Judge Yasuo Shimoyama of the Saitama District Court ordered Mugen to pay ¥ 240 million in fines. The judge ruled that auditor Norio Hirokawa played the central role in the tax evasion scheme, sentencing him to three years imprisonment.
