= Masaichi Kondō =

- 近藤 政市
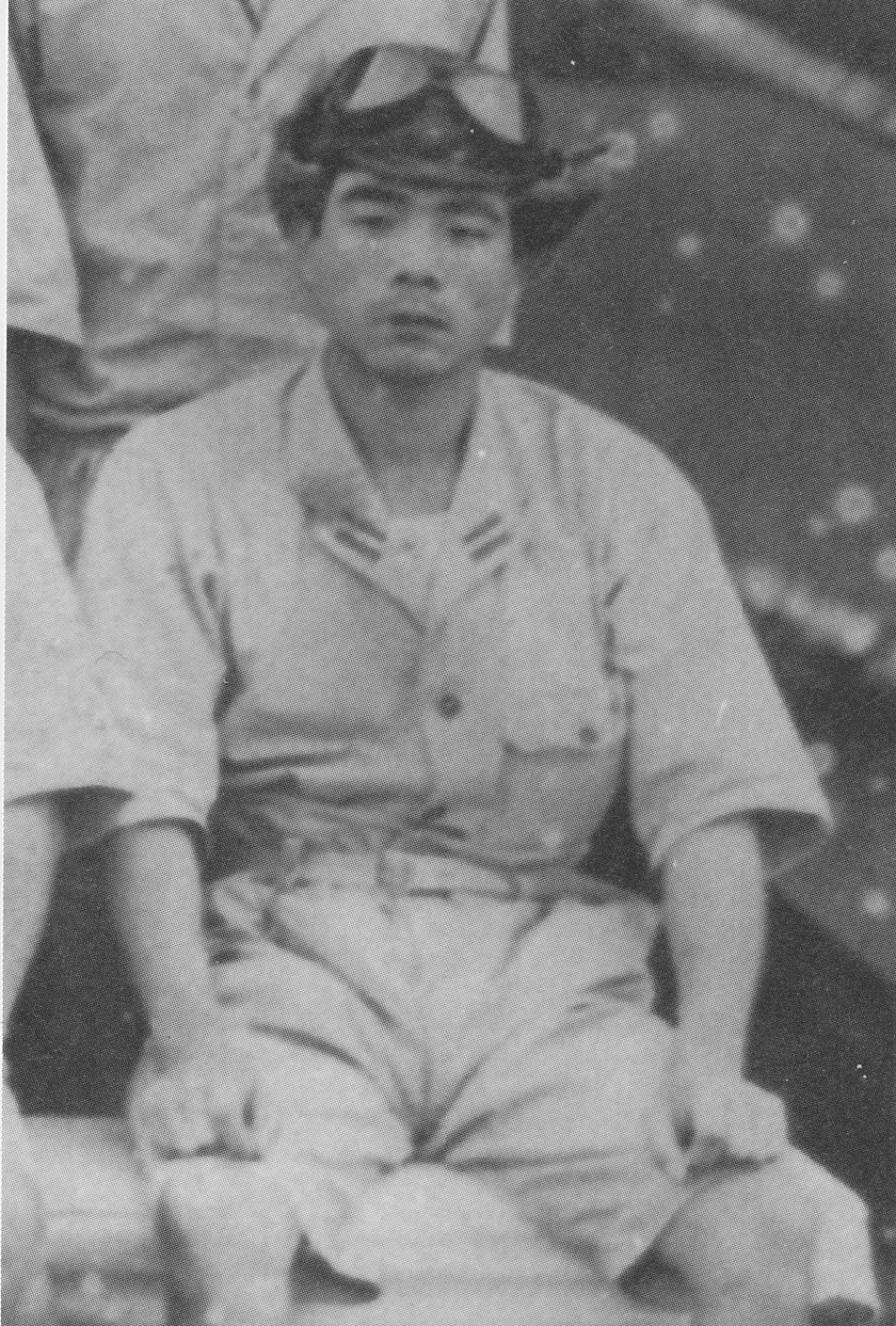
- Kondō in January 1943 while serving on the aircraft carrier Jun'yō
- Born: August 1917; Ehime, Japan
- Military career
- Allegiance: Empire of Japan
- Branch: Imperial Japanese Navy Air Service (IJN)
- Rank: Ensign
- Conflicts: Second Sino-Japanese War; World War II; Pacific War

Masaichi Kondō (近藤 政市, Kondō Masaichi; born August 1917) was an officer and ace fighter pilot in the Imperial Japanese Navy (IJN) during the Second Sino-Japanese War and the Pacific theater of World War II. He graduated from his pilot training class in 1935 and served with four different carrier-based and two different land-based air groups (kokutai) in China and in the South Pacific. In aerial combat over China and the Pacific, he was officially credited with destroying 13 enemy aircraft. He was wounded in a dogfight over the Solomon Islands, spent 15 months in a hospital, and survived the war.
