= Takeo Fujisawa =

Japanese businessman (1910–1988)

- 藤沢 武夫
- Born: 10 November 1910; Yūki, Ibaraki, Japan
- Died: 30 December 1988 (aged 78); Minato, Tokyo, Japan
- Occupation: Businessman
- Known for: Co-founder of Honda Motor Co., Ltd.

Takeo Fujisawa (藤沢 武夫, Fujisawa Takeo; November 10, 1910 – December 30, 1988) was a Japanese businessman who co-founded Honda Motor Co., Ltd. alongside Soichiro Honda. Fujisawa oversaw the financial side of the company while Honda handled the engineering and product development. Together, they took the company from a small manufacturer of bicycle engines to a worldwide car manufacturer.

== Biography ==
Takeo Fujisawa was born in Yuki, Ibaraki as the eldest son of Hideshiro Fujisawa and his wife Yuki. After a series of jobs in banking and other sectors, his father Shushiro had become the manager of the Jitsueisha, a publicity company that made slide commercials for display at movie theaters. In 1923, when the young Fujisawa was in his first year at Kyoka Middle School, the Great Kantō earthquake dealt the whole family a terrible blow. The Jitsueisha was destroyed and the elder Fujisawa was left with nothing but borrowed money to live on. Later he planned to revive the movie industry but the tremendous efforts he had made after the disaster had wrecked his health and he became an invalid. The young Fujisawa hoped to become a teacher but failed the official Tokyo school examinations and worked as a professional copyist, writing addresses on envelopes in order to support the family and devoting his leisure time to reading literature.

In 1930, he was called up for military service and after a year in the army he resumed his work as a copyist. Fujisawa’s first permanent employment started in September 1934 when he was twenty-three years old. He worked for the Mitsuwa Shokai, a company in Hatchobori, Nihonbashi, Tokyo, a dealer of steel products, Fujisawa was employed as a traveling salesman, visiting small factories to promote Mitsuwa Shokai’s steel products. When asked why he had chosen this particular job when his interpersonal skills were so weak, his only reply was that he had felt an intuition that this was the path he should follow. His hidden talent suddenly blossomed and he gradually developed relationships with a range of new clients, becoming the company’s top-performing salesman. He adopted the slogan “Always tell your clients the truth” and if ever it looked as though a delivery was going to be late, he would not try to make up excuses but would apologize and give an honest explanation of the reason for the delay. In this way he could turn a problem to his advantage, because his clients came to trust him all the more. By always offering a solution as well as apologizing, he made sure that the relationship of trust was preserved. This episode in Fujisawa’s life gives a strong impression of his character and exhibits just the same attitude as he showed later in his career.

He entered the newly founded Honda in 1949, and in 1964 was promoted to vice-president. In 1973 he retired from this position (along with Soichiro Honda himself) and became a corporate adviser to the company. After his retirement, he opened an antique shop in Tokyo.

== Death and legacy ==
Fujisawa died of a heart attack in December 1988, aged 78. In January, in the new era, he was posthumously appointed to the fourth rank in the order of precedence and decorated with the Order of the Rising Sun, Third Class.

== Works ==
- 経営に終わりはない [There is no End to Management], Nesuko, 1986, ISBN 9784890367047
- 松明は自分の手で [The Torch is In Your Hands], PHP Institute, 2009, ISBN 9784569704159
- Fukui, Takeo; Honda, Soichiro; Fujisawa, Takeo (2006), Top Talks—Honda's Origin, Honda Motor Corp., ASIN B003433RF0
