= Soichiro Honda =

Japanese businessman

Soichiro Honda Senior Third Rank
- 本田 宗一郎
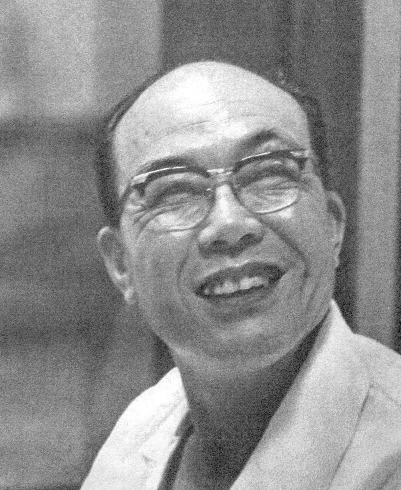
- Honda in 1964
- Born: Honda Soichiro; 17 November 1906; Hamamatsu, Shizuoka, Japan
- Died: 5 August 1991 (aged 84); Tokyo, Japan
- Occupation: Engineering
- Known for: Founder of Honda Motor Co., Ltd.
- Spouse: Sachi Honda (1914–2013)
- Children: Hirotoshi Honda, Yasuhiro Watanabe

Soichiro Honda (本田 宗一郎, Honda Sōichirō; 17 November 1906 – 5 August 1991) was a Japanese engineer and industrialist. In 1948, he established Honda Motor Co., Ltd. and oversaw its expansion from a wooden shack manufacturing bicycle motors to a multinational automobile and motorcycle manufacturer.

== Early years ==
Honda was born in Kōmyō village, Iwata District, Shizuoka, near Hamamatsu on 17 November 1906. He spent his early childhood helping his father, Gihei Honda, a blacksmith, with his bicycle repair business. At the time his mother, Mika Honda, was a weaver. Honda was not interested in traditional education. His school handed grade reports to the children, but required that they be returned stamped with the family seal, to make sure that a parent had seen it. Honda created a stamp to forge his family seal out of a used rubber bicycle pedal cover.

The fraud was soon discovered when he started to make forged stamps for other children. Honda was unaware that the stamp was supposed to be mirror-imaged. His family name 本田 (Honda) is symmetrical when written vertically, so it did not cause a problem, but some of the other children's family names were not.

Even as a toddler, Honda had been thrilled by the first car that was ever seen in his village. In later life, he would often say that he could never forget the smell of oil it gave off, saying that it smelled "like perfume". Soichiro once borrowed one of his father's bicycles to see a demonstration of an airplane made by pilot Art Smith, which cemented his love for machinery and invention.

At 15, without any formal education, Honda left home and headed to Tokyo to look for work. He obtained an apprenticeship at a garage in 1922. After some hesitation over his employment, he stayed for six years, working as a car mechanic before returning home to start his own auto repair business in 1928 at the age of 22.

Honda raced a turbocharged Ford in the "1st Japan Automobile Race" at Tamagawa Speedway in 1936. He crashed and seriously injured his left eye. His brother was also injured. After that, he quit racing.

== Development of Honda Motor Co., Ltd. ==
In 1937, Honda founded Tōkai Seiki to produce piston rings for Toyota. During World War II, a US B-29 bomber attack destroyed Tōkai Seiki's Yamashita plant in 1944 and the Iwata plant collapsed in the 1945 Mikawa earthquake. After the war, Honda sold the salvageable remains of the company to Toyota for ¥450,000 and used the proceeds to found the Honda Technical Research Institute in October 1946.

In 1948, he started producing a complete motorized bicycle, the Type A, which was driven by the first mass-produced engine designed by Honda, and was sold until 1951. The Type D in 1949 was a true motorcycle with a pressed-steel frame designed and produced by Honda and with a 2-stroke, 98 cc (6.0 cu in) 3 hp (2.2 kW) engine, and became the first model in the Dream series of motorcycles. The Society of Automotive Engineers of Japan lists both the Type A and the Type D models as two of their 240 Landmarks of Japanese Automotive Technology.

After the war, Honda became reacquainted with his friend Takeo Fujisawa, whom he had known during his days as a supplier of piston rings to Nakajima Aircraft Company. In 1949, Honda hired Fujisawa, who oversaw the financial side of the company and helped the firm expand. In 1959, Honda Motorcycles opened its first dealership in the United States.

As president of the Honda Motor Company, Soichiro Honda turned the company into a billion-dollar multinational that produced the best-selling motorcycles in the world. Honda's engineering and marketing skills resulted in Honda motorcycles outselling Triumph and Harley-Davidson in their respective home markets.

Honda remained president until his retirement in 1973, where he stayed on as director and was appointed "supreme advisor" in 1983. His status was such that People magazine placed him on their "25 Most Intriguing People of the Year" list for 1980, dubbing him "the Japanese Henry Ford". In retirement, Honda busied himself with work connected with the Honda Foundation. In his memoirs, Soichiro Honda expressed his sorrow for sometimes being rude to his employees, humiliating and occasionally even slapping them in the face.

== Last years ==
Even at his advanced age, Soichiro and his wife Sachi both held private pilot's licenses. He also enjoyed skiing, golf, racing cars, hang gliding and ballooning at 77, and he was a highly accomplished artist. He and Takeo Fujisawa made a pact never to force their own sons to join the company. His son, Hirotoshi Honda, was the founder and former CEO of Mugen Motorsports, a tuner for Honda vehicles who also created original racing vehicles.

ASME established the Soichiro Honda Medal in recognition of Mr. Honda's achievements in 1982; this medal recognizes outstanding achievement or significant engineering contributions in the field of personal transportation. In 1989, he was inducted into the Automotive Hall of Fame near Detroit.

Soichiro Honda died on 5 August 1991, days before the Hungarian Grand Prix, of liver failure. He was 84. Ayrton Senna, winner of the Grand Prix, dedicated the victory to Honda. He was posthumously appointed to the senior third rank in the order of precedence and appointed a Grand Cordon of the Order of the Rising Sun.

== Honours ==
- Grand Officer of the Order of Merit of the Italian Republic (30 March 1978)
- Grand Cordon of the Order of the Rising Sun (5 August 1991; posthumous)
- Senior Third Rank (5 August 1991; posthumous)
- Golden Pheasant Award of the Scout Association of Japan (1991)
