= CVCC =

Reduced-emissions engine by Honda

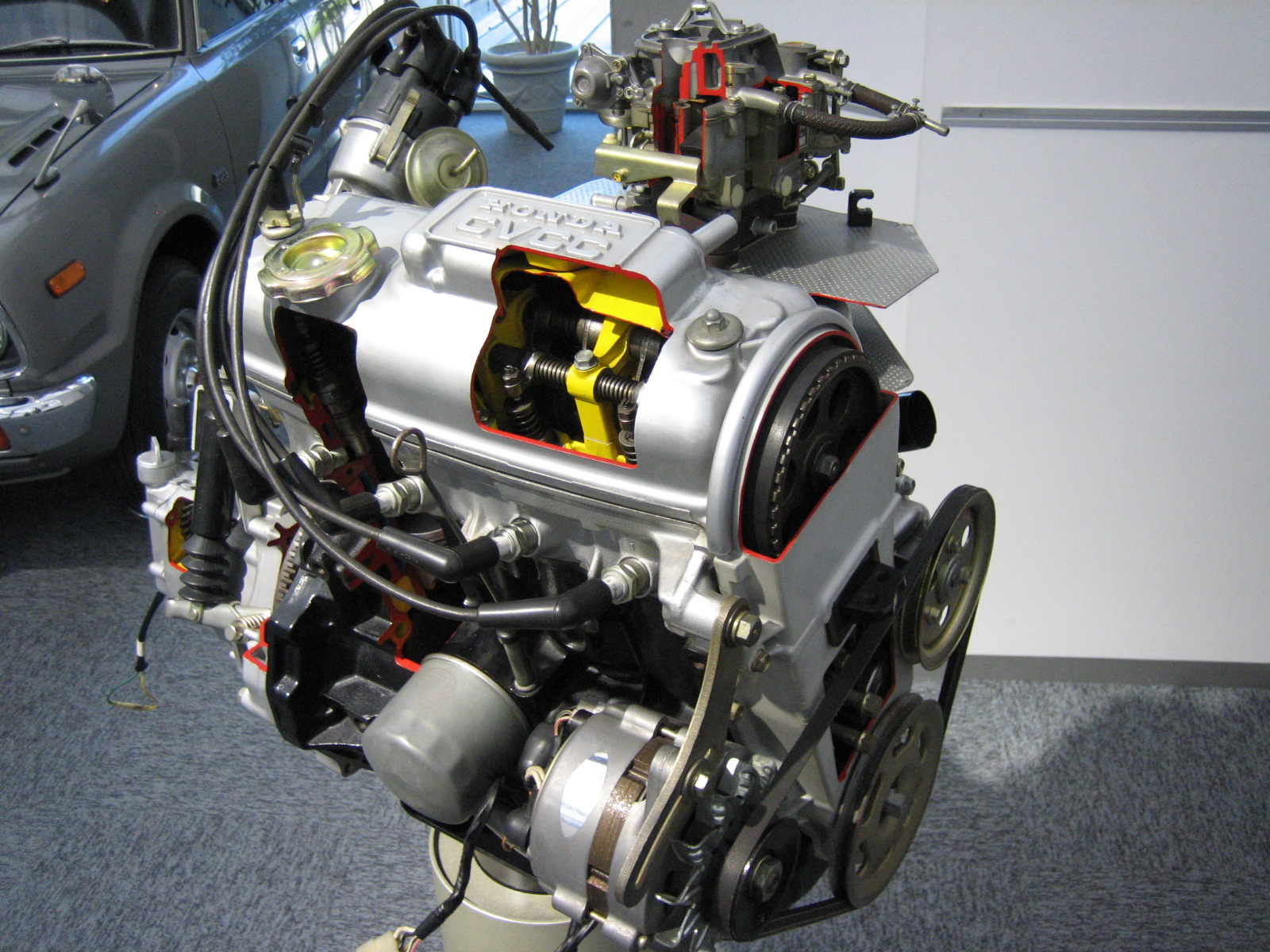
A Honda Civic engine with CVCC

CVCC, or Compound Vortex Controlled Combustion (Japanese: 複合渦流調整燃焼方式, Hepburn: Fukugō Uzuryū Chōsei Nenshō Hōshiki), is an internal combustion engine technology developed and trademarked by the Honda Motor Company.

The technology's name refers to its primary features: Compound refers to the use of two combustion chambers; Vortex refers to the vortex generated in the main combustion chamber, increasing combustion speed, and Controlled Combustion refers to combustion occurring in a timely, controlled manner.

The engine innovatively used a secondary, smaller auxiliary inlet valve to feed a richer air-fuel mixture to the combustion chamber around the spark plug, while the standard inlet valve fed a leaner air-fuel mixture to the remainder of the chamber, creating a more efficient and complete combustion.

== History ==
Following the establishment of an "Air Pollution Research Group" by Honda in 1965, its collection of emissions data from American automakers, and subsequent research into emissions control and prechambers, the first mention of CVCC technology was by Soichiro Honda on February 12, 1971, at the Federation of Economic Organizations Hall in Otemachi, Chiyoda-ku, Tokyo.

On the advice of University of Tokyo professor Tsuyoshi Asanuma, then-Honda R&D Director Tasuku Date, Engine-performance Research Block head Shizuo Yagi, and then-Engineering Design Chief Engineer Kazuo Nakagawa began research into lean combustion. After Date suggested the use of a prechamber, which some diesel engines utilized, the first engine to be installed with the CVCC approach for testing was a single-cylinder, 300 cc version of Honda's EA engine installed in a modified Honda N600 hatchback in January 1970. This technology allowed Honda's cars to meet Japanese and American emissions standards in the 1970s without the need for a catalytic converter.

A type of stratified charge technology, it was publicized on October 11, 1972 and licensed to Toyota (as TTC-V), Ford, Chrysler, and Isuzu before making its production debut in the 1975 ED1 engine. As emission laws advanced and required more stringent admissible levels, CVCC was abandoned in favor of PGM-FI (Programmed Fuel Injection) on all Honda vehicles. Some Honda vehicles in Japan used electronically controlled "PGM-Carb" carburetors on transitional Honda D, E and ZC engines.

The 1981 amendments to the Clean Air Act made it increasingly difficult for CVCC to meet emissions and Honda joined the wider industry in using 3-way Catalysts.

In 2007, the Honda CVCC technology was added to Japan's Mechanical Engineering Heritage list.

== Operation ==
Honda CVCC engines have normal inlet and exhaust valves, plus a small auxiliary inlet valve. On the intake stroke a large amount of a very lean mixture is drawn into the main combustion chamber; at the same time a very small amount of rich mixture is pulled into the pre-chamber near the spark plug. The pre-chamber near the spark plug is contained by a small perforated metal plate. At the end of the compression stroke, the pre-chamber is rich in fuel, there is a moderately rich mixture in the main chamber near the pre-chamber outlet and the rest of the main chamber is quite lean. On ignition, flame fronts emerge from the perforations and ignite the remainder of the air–fuel charge. When the sparkplug in the pre-chamber fires, the rich mixture ignites easily and the flame spreads from there into the main chamber, igniting a mixture so lean it wouldn't have fired satisfactorily with just a sparkplug. The remaining engine cycle is as per a standard four-stroke engine.

Formation of carbon monoxide and hydrocarbons are minimized by the overall leanness of the mixture, and the stable and slow burning in the main combustion chamber keeps peak temperature low enough to suppress formation of oxides of nitrogen while keeping the mean temperature high enough long enough to give low hydrocarbon emissions. The design allowed the engine to burn less fuel more efficiently without the use of an exhaust gas recirculation valve or a catalytic converter, although those methods were installed subsequently to further improve emission reduction.

== Advantages ==
The most significant advantage with CVCC was that it allowed for carbureted engines that did not rely on intake swirl. Previous stratified charge engines needed costly fuel injection systems. Additionally, previous engines tried to increase the velocity and swirl of the intake charge to keep rich and lean mixtures separated; Honda was able to maintain separation via the shape of the combustion chamber.

The design of CVCC also allowed it to be adapted to existing engines, since only the cylinder head needed to be modified.

== Early design flaw ==
Some early CVCC engines had problems with the auxiliary valves' retaining collars vibrating loose. Once unscrewed, oil would leak from the valvetrain into the prechamber, causing a sudden loss of power and large amounts of smoke to flow from the exhaust pipe. These symptoms usually indicated the failure of critical oil seals in the motor that would result in costly repairs. However, the solution was quite simple; Honda corrected the problem with metal retaining rings that slipped over the valves' retaining collars and prevented them from backing out of their threads.

== CVCC-II ==
The 1983 Honda Prelude (the first year of the second generation of Preludes) used CVCC in combination with a catalytic converter to reduce emissions, along with two separate side draft carburetors (instead of a single, progressive twin-choke carburetor). This new system was called CVCC-II. The following year, a standard cylinder head design was used, and the center carburetor (providing the rich mixture) was removed. The Honda City AA, introduced in November 1981, also used a CVCC-II engine called the ER. Its use of CVCC was also known as COMBAX (COMpact Blazing-combustion AXiom).

== CVCC-equipped engines ==
Series	Displacement	Valvetrain	Aspiration	Power	Torque	Applications
ED	1,487 cc (1.5 L; 90.7 cu in)	SOHC 12-valve	3-barrel carburetor	52 hp (39 kW) @ 5,000 rpm	68 lb⋅ft (92 N⋅m) @ 3,000 rpm	1975- Honda Civic CVCC (ED1) 1975- Honda Civic Wagon (ED2) 1976-1979 Honda Civic CVCC (ED3) 1976-1979 Honda Civic Wagon (ED4)
EF	1,598 cc (1.6 L; 97.5 cu in)	SOHC 12-valve	3-barrel carburetor	68 hp (51 kW) @ 5,000 rpm	85 lb⋅ft (115 N⋅m) @ 3,000 rpm	1976-1978 USDM Honda Accord CVCC
EJ	1,335 cc (1.3 L; 81.5 cu in)	SOHC 12-valve	3-barrel carburetor	68 hp (51 kW) @ 5,000 rpm	77 lb⋅ft (104 N⋅m) @ 3,000 rpm	1980- Honda Civic (EJ1) 1980- Honda Ballade (EJ1) 1980- Triumph Acclaim (EJ1) 1981-1983 Honda Civic CVCC (EJ1)
EK	1,751 cc (1.8 L; 106.9 cu in)	SOHC 12-valve	3-barrel carburetor	72 hp (54 kW) @ 4,500 rpm (six-port cylinder head, 1979-1980) 75 hp (56 kW) @ 4,500 rpm (eight-port cylinder head, 1980-1981)	94 lb⋅ft (127 N⋅m) @ 3,000 rpm (six-port cylinder head, 1979-1980) 96 lb⋅ft (130 N⋅m) @ 3,000 rpm (eight-port cylinder head, 1980-1981)	1979-1983 USDM Honda Accord CVCC 1979-1982 USDM Honda Prelude CVCC 1981-1985 JDM Honda Vigor
EM	1,487 cc (1.5 L; 90.7 cu in)	SOHC 12-valve	3-barrel carburetor	52 hp (39 kW) @ 5,000 rpm (1980) 63 hp (47 kW) @ 5,000 rpm (1981-1983)	68 lb⋅ft (92 N⋅m) @ 3,000 rpm (1980) 77 lb⋅ft (104 N⋅m) @ 3,000 rpm (1981-1983)	1980-1983 Honda Civic (EM1)
EP	1,601 cc (1.6 L; 97.7 cu in)	SOHC 8-valve	2-barrel carburetor	89 hp (66 kW) @ 5,500 rpm	95 lb⋅ft (129 N⋅m) @ 3,500 rpm	1980-1985 Honda Quint 1980-1981 Honda Accord
ER (CVCC-II)	1,231 cc (1.2 L; 75.1 cu in)	SOHC 12-valve	1-barrel carburetor 2-barrel carburetor	44 hp (33 kW) @ 4,500 rpm (1-barrel carb, EU) 55 hp (41 kW) @ 5,000 rpm (1-barrel carb, EU, super fuel) 60 hp (45 kW) @ 5,000 rpm (2-barrel carb, JDM, Pro versions) 62 hp (46 kW) @ 5,000 rpm (2-barrel carb, JDM) 66 hp (49 kW) @ 5,000 rpm (2-barrel carb, JDM, manual R and Cabriolet)	60 lb⋅ft (82 N⋅m) @ 2,500 rpm (1-barrel carb, EU) 69 lb⋅ft (93 N⋅m) @ 3,500 rpm (1-barrel carb, EU, super fuel) 71 lb⋅ft (96 N⋅m) @ 3,000 rpm (2-barrel carb, JDM, Pro versions) 72 lb⋅ft (98 N⋅m) @ 3,000 rpm (2-barrel carb, JDM) 72 lb⋅ft (98 N⋅m) @ 3,000 rpm (2-barrel carb, JDM, manual R and Cabriolet)	1981-1986 Honda City
ES (CVCC-II)	1,829 cc (1.8 L; 111.6 cu in)	SOHC 12-valve	Dual side draft carburetors (ES1) 3-barrel carburetor (ES2)	100 hp (75 kW) @ 5,500 rpm (ES1) 86 hp (64 kW) @ 5,800 rpm (ES2)	104 lb⋅ft (141 N⋅m) @ 4,000 rpm (ES1) 99 lb⋅ft (134 N⋅m) @ 3,500 rpm (ES2)	1983-1984 Honda Prelude (ES1) 1984-1985 Honda Accord (ES2)
EV	1,342 cc (1.3 L; 81.9 cu in)	SOHC 12-valve	3-barrel carburetor	60 hp (45 kW) @ 5,500 rpm (USDM) 79 hp (59 kW) @ 6,000 rpm (JDM) 70 hp (52 kW) @ 6,000 rpm (Rover 213)	73 lb⋅ft (99 N⋅m) @ 3,500 rpm (USDM) 82 lb⋅ft (111 N⋅m) @ 3,500 rpm (JDM)	1983-1986 Honda Civic (EV1) 1983-1986 Honda CR-X (EV1) 1984-1990 Rover 213 (EV2)
EW	1,488 cc (1.5 L; 90.8 cu in)	SOHC 12-valve	3-barrel carburetor	58–76 hp (43–57 kW)	80–84 lb⋅ft (108–114 N⋅m)	1984-1985 Honda Civic/CR-X DX (EW1) 1984-1986 Honda Civic (EW1) 1984-1986 Honda Shuttle (EW1)
EY	1,598 cc (1.6 L; 97.5 cu in)	SOHC 12-valve	Carburetor	93 hp (69 kW) @ 5,800 rpm	98 lb⋅ft (133 N⋅m) @ 3,500 rpm	1983 Honda Accord 1600 E-AC
