= Honda City (AA) =

Honda City AA/VF/FA
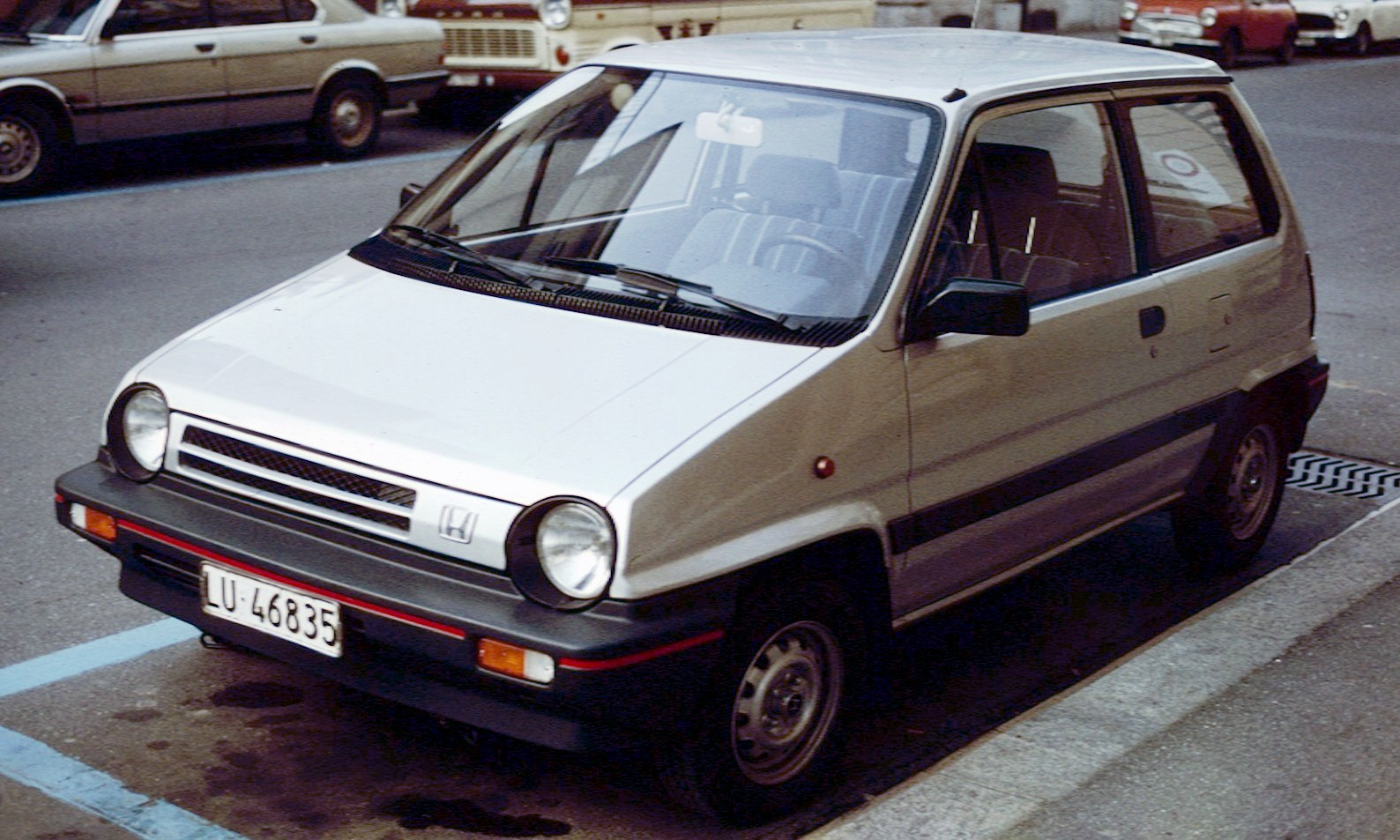
- European-market Honda Jazz

Overview
- Manufacturer: Honda
- Also called: Honda Jazz (Europe)
- Production: November 1981–October 1986

Body and chassis
- Class: Subcompact car
- Body style: 2-, 4- or 5-seater 3-door hatchback/van 4-seater 2-door convertible
- Layout: Transverse FF layout

Powertrain
- Engine: 1231 cc ER inline 4; 44 PS (32 kW) @ 4,500 rpm – 110 PS (81 kW) @ 5,500 rpm
- Transmission: 4/5-speed manual 4+3-speed Hypershift manual 2-speed + overdrive Hondamatic semi-automatic

Dimensions
- Wheelbase: 2,220 mm (87.4 in)
- Length: 3,380 mm (133.1 in)–3,420 mm (134.6 in)
- Width: 1,570 mm (61.8 in)–1,625 mm (64.0 in)
- Height: 1,460 mm (57.5 in)–1,570 mm (61.8 in)
- Curb weight: 640 kg (1,411 lb)–810 kg (1,786 lb)

The first-generation Honda City (Honda Jazz in Europe) was a subcompact hatchback produced by Japanese automaker Honda and aimed mainly at the Japanese domestic market. Referred to as having a "Tall Boy" body style by Honda, it was available in a number of versions, some of which were sold abroad.

First introduced in November 1981, it carried the model codes AA for standard models, VF for vans, and FA for the wide-track Turbo II and Cabriolet. In Japan, it was sold at the Honda Clio dealership sales channel.

== History ==
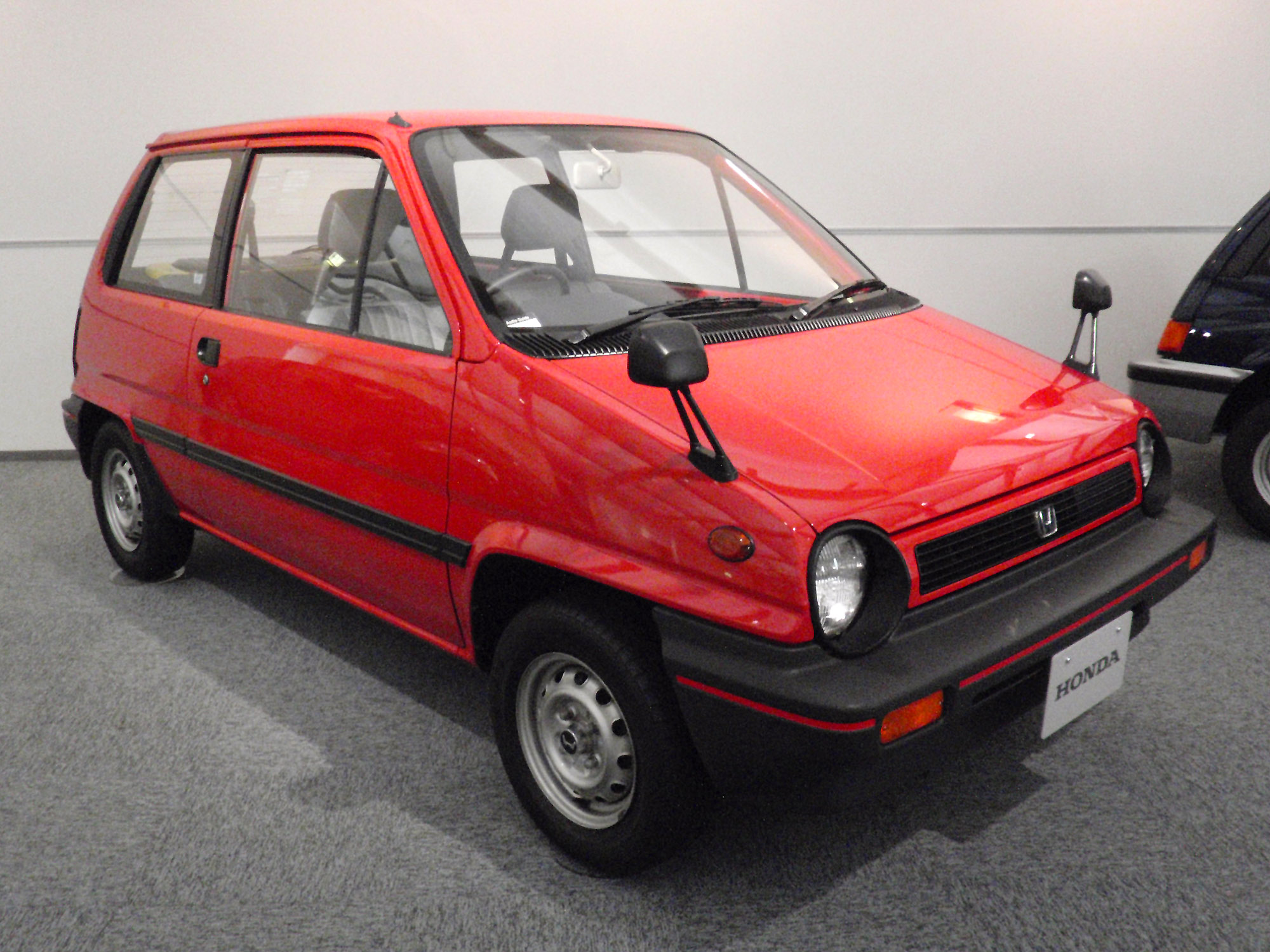
Honda City R

While the City's layout was traditional for its category, with front-wheel drive and a transversely mounted engine, its relatively upright seating arrangement was innovative, creating legroom comparable to larger cars. This, combined with class-leading fuel economy, led to it being a rapid and considerable success in the Japanese domestic market. The engine was the CVCC-II 1,231 cc (75.1 cu in) four-cylinder Honda ER engine, specifically designed for the City. It was also available with the Motocompo, a special 50 cc folding scooter constructed to fit in the City's small luggage area, itself designed around the Motocompo. In spite of the creativity and novelty of its design, the City was narrowly pipped for the Japanese motoring journalists' Car of the Year Award by the luxurious Toyota Soarer.

First-generation production ended in late 1986 with the introduction of the second-generation City.

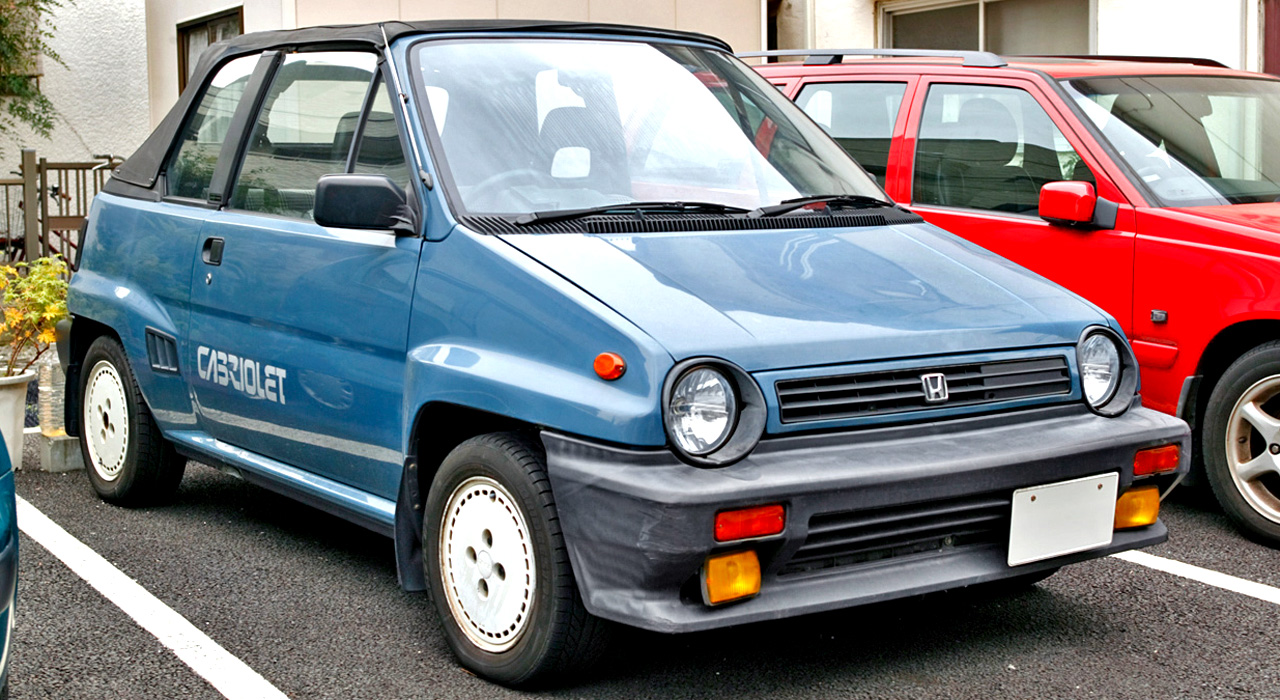
Honda City Cabriolet

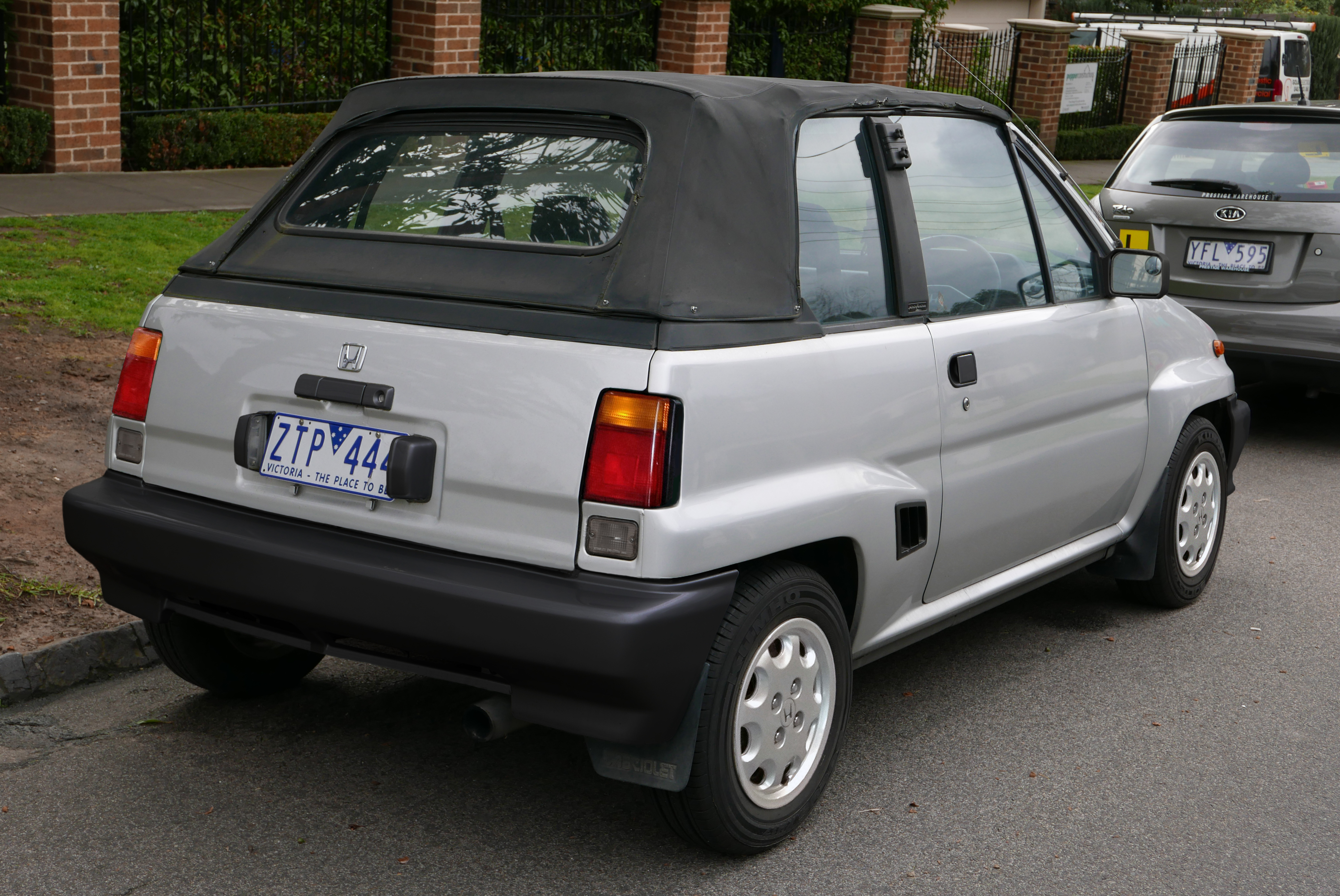
Honda City Cabriolet (rear view)

=== Models ===
Originally, the economical E model, a sportier R model, and two Pro commercial van models were introduced. E models used higher-geared transmissions and trip computers to increase gas mileage. In September 1982, a turbocharged version of the ER engine was added to the lineup as part of the Turbo I model.

Designed by Pininfarina and introduced in August 1984, the drop-top Cabriolet used the wider track, fenders, and bigger bumpers of the Turbo II, but was only normally available with the naturally aspirated 67 PS (49 kW) engine. These wide-track models were designated with the model code FA rather than AA. The Cabriolet was well equipped, with a glass rear window and twelve exclusive pastel color options. This was the first car of this kind built in Japan, with a worldwide wave of convertibles based on family cars following suit throughout the 1980s.

In addition to vans and convertibles, there was also an "R Manhattan Roof" model with a 10 cm (3.9 in) taller roof. An "R Manhattan Sound" model incorporated high-quality stereo equipment (including the "Bodysonic", which transmitted sound vibrations through the seats).

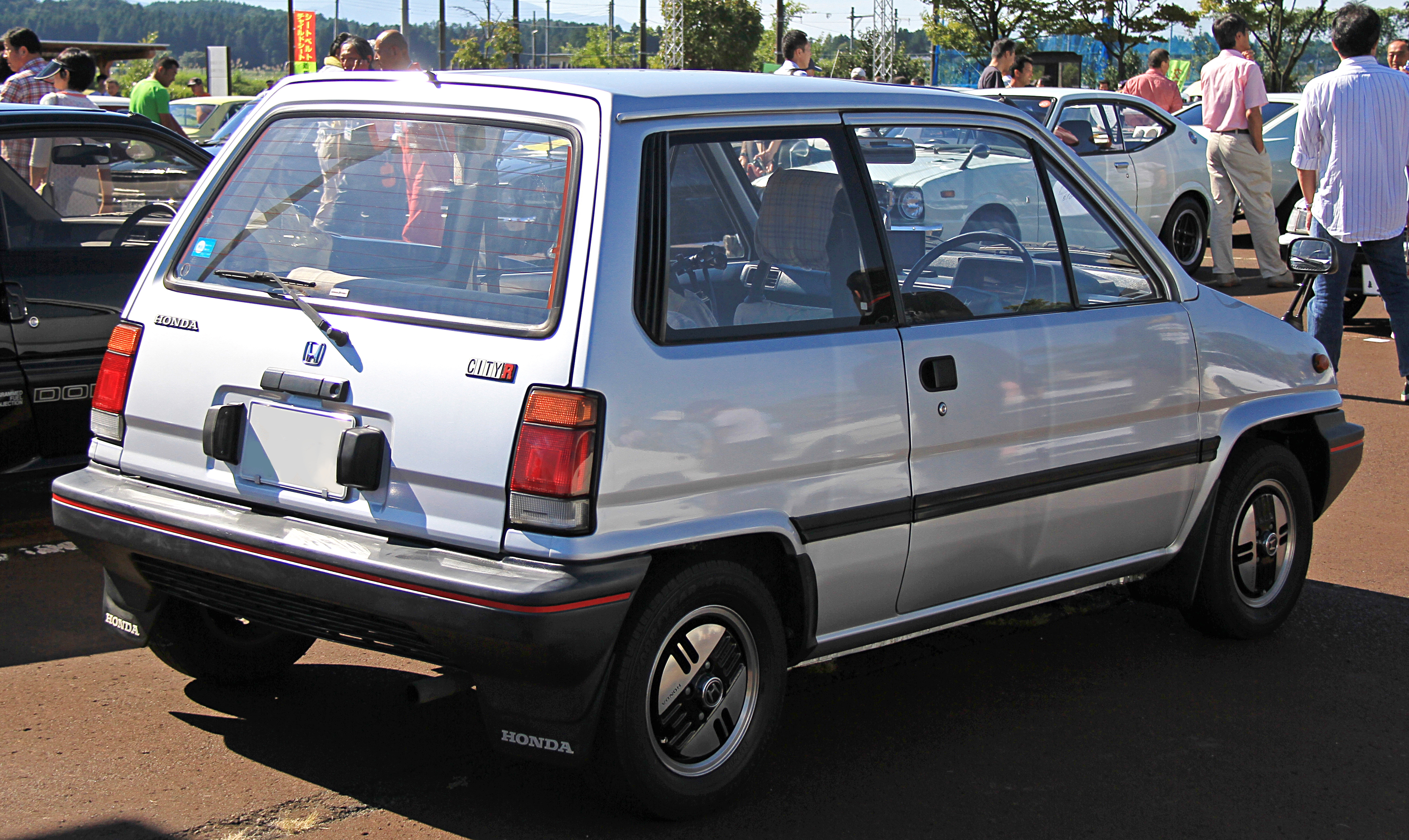
1983 Honda City R (rear view)

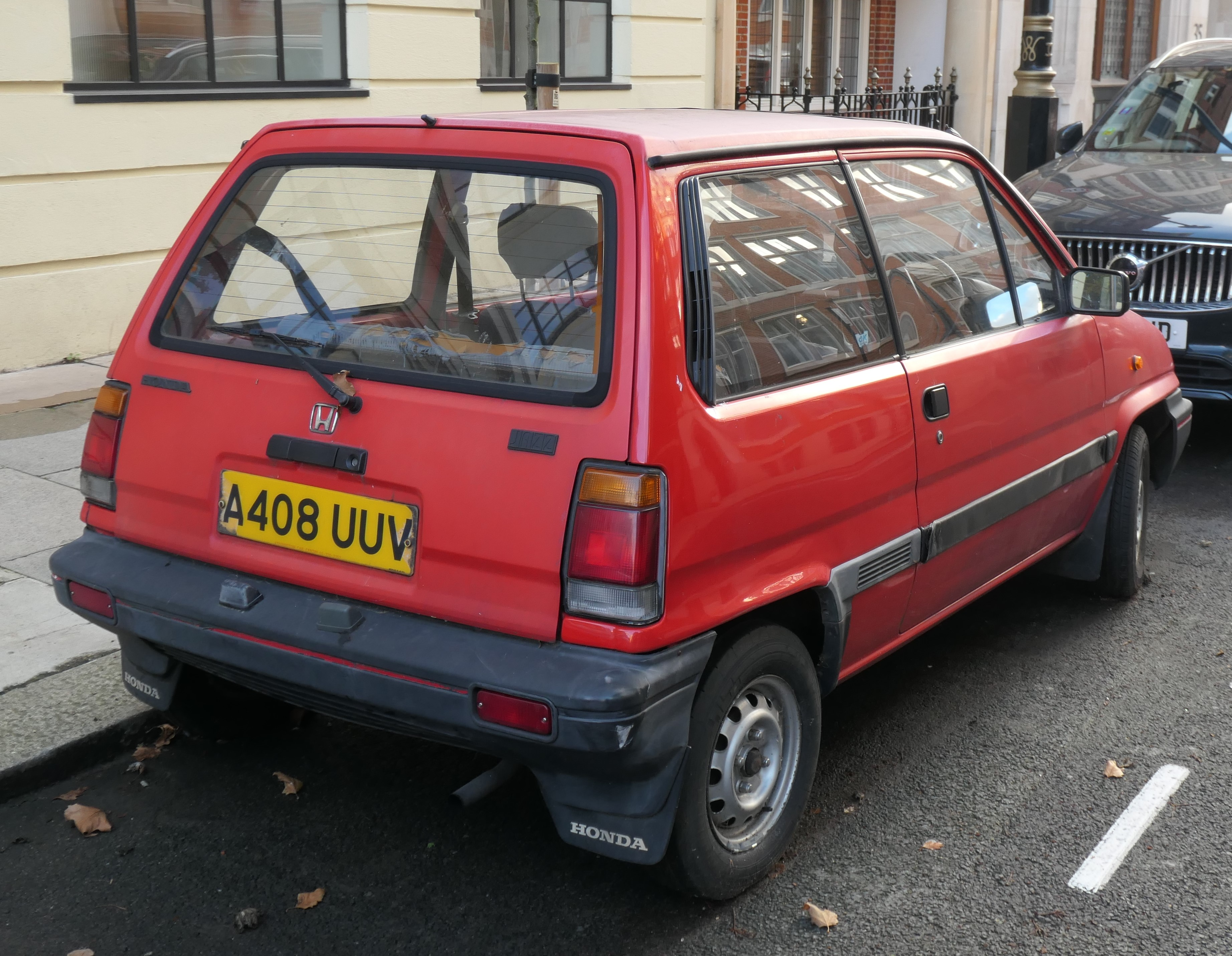
1984 Honda Jazz (United Kingdom)

A light March 1985 facelift brought with it a new asymmetrical grille for non-Cabriolet models and some interior improvements. The E and E II models were replaced by the new E III, while a lower priced U model joined the lineup. The U was the only non-commercial City in Japan to be available with a four-speed manual. Naturally aspirated engines in the AA Citys also gained new fiber-reinforced metal (FRM) cylinder liners, a world first in series production. The E III, in addition to benefiting from the FRM cylinder liners, also had an electronically variable lean-burn engine. One month later, the R became available with the "Hypershift" transmission, a four-speed with an electronically controlled overdrive added to the second, third, and fourth gears – in essence creating a 7-speed gearbox.

==== City Pro (VF) ====
Commercial models were called Pros in Japan, and were available with either two or five seats (as the Pro T or Pro F). The Pro had a manual choke and lacked brake boosting (until the 1985 facelift), transistorized ignition (lowering power by 2 PS (1 kW)), and a five-speed manual transmission option.

==== Exports ====
Exports of the City were only of naturally aspirated hatchback and van models.

In Europe, the City was renamed the Jazz, due to Opel having the rights to the City name after having used it on a hatchback version of the Kadett C. The Jazz was marketed in Europe from 1982 to 1986, but was generally priced too high to compete. It was only classified as a four-seater, and offered either 45 or 56 PS (33 or 41 kW; 44 or 55 hp) depending on fuel grade. In early 1985, a Hondamatic-equipped variant also entered the European market.

The City was also sold in Australia (in two-seater van form, to circumvent Australian import restrictions and design regulations on passenger vehicles at the time) and New Zealand (where it was locally assembled). The Australian van model claimed 47 kW (64 PS) at 5000 rpm on Super fuel with 10.2:1 compression and a twin-throat carburetor, and was allowed to carry 370 kg (820 lb) while its Japanese City Pro T counterpart was only classed for 300 kg (660 lb).

== City Turbo ==
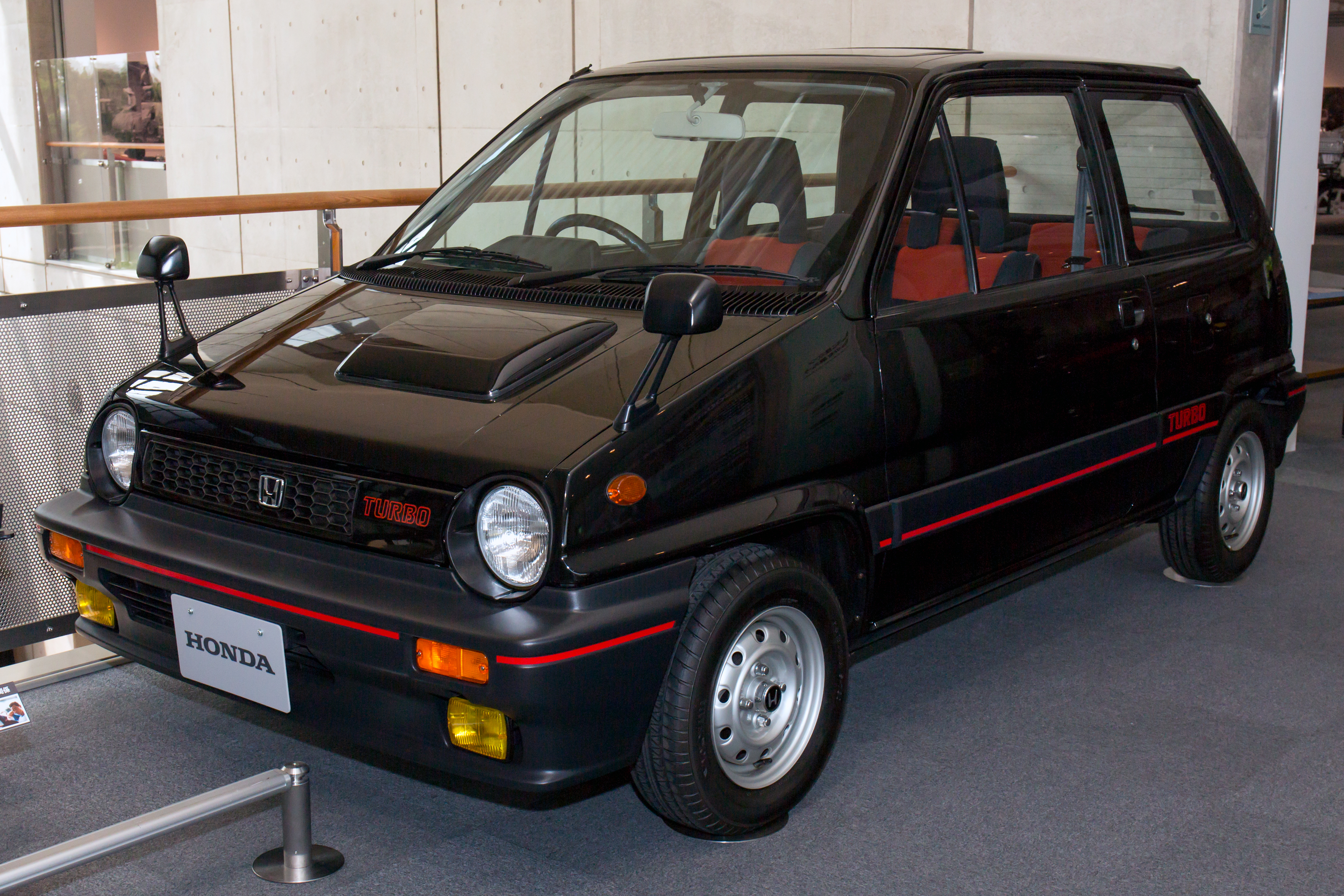
Honda City Turbo I

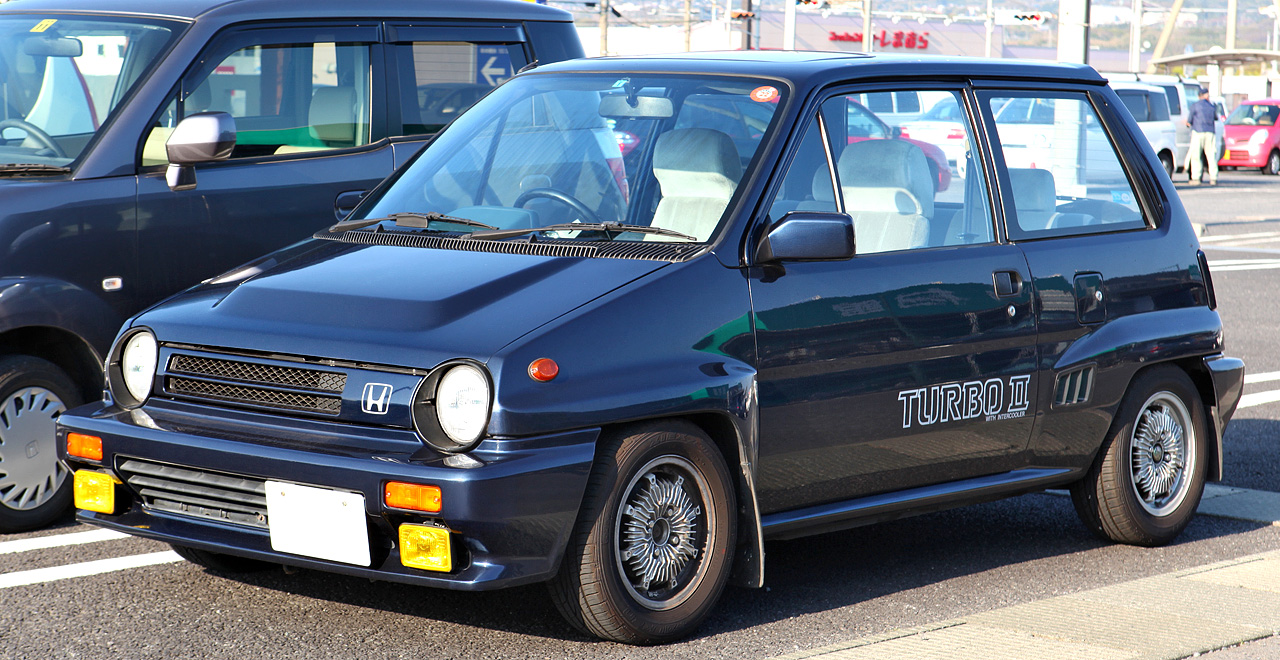
Honda City Turbo II

The Honda City Turbo was a hot hatch produced between September 1982 and 1986. For a long time, the City Turbo was one of the few non-kei car Hondas to be equipped with a turbocharged engine. The City Turbo was the brainchild of Hirotoshi Honda, son of Honda founder Soichiro Honda as well as founder and owner of Mugen.

In the early 1980s, Mugen was a small tuning company that was beginning to garner a reputation producing performance parts for motorcycles and automobiles, but had yet to gain recognition outside of racing circles. When he created the City Turbo, Hirotoshi took one of Honda's most unassuming vehicles and successfully turned it into an aggressive street rocket, considered to be well ahead of its time. Impressed, Honda took Hirotoshi's idea and made a production version, introduced in September 1982. A few months earlier, Honda staffers took two City Turbos on a gruelling 10,000-kilometre (6,200 mi) round trip of Europe, all the way from Sicily to Karasjok in the Arctic north.

In November 1983, the intercooled Turbo II joined the lineup. Flared fenders, side skirts and graphics combined for a much more pugnacious appearance, complementing its "Bulldog" nickname. In late 1984, the original Turbo was discontinued (after some were built as 1985 models), while Turbo II production continued through the remainder of the first-generation City's production run.

=== Engine ===
The City Turbo shared the ER engine with its more pedestrian siblings, but the addition of a turbocharger resulted in power and torque outputs of 100 PS (74 kW; 99 hp) at 5,500 rpm and 15.0 kp⋅m (147 N⋅m; 108 lb⋅ft) at 3,000 rpm. Further changes to the engine included an aluminium/titanium alloy head and a magnesium valve cover to reduce weight. The Ishikawajima Heavy Industry (IHI) RHB51 turbocharger, developed as a joint venture between IHI and Honda, was lighter and smaller than most other turbos and could run at higher speeds. When combined with Honda's PGM-FI manifold injection and an 8-bit digital control unit, the result was a very efficient engine with minimal turbo lag. 0–100 km/h was possible in 8.6 seconds.

The later City Turbo II's engine featured an intercooler, a revised intake plenum, a slightly larger throttle body, a modified inlet manifold, a higher AR turbo compressor, exhaust housings, and a slightly raised (7.6:1) compression ratio. It produced 110 PS (81 kW; 108 hp) at 5500 rpm and 16.3 kp⋅m (160 N⋅m; 118 lb⋅ft) at 3000 rpm.

=== Chassis ===
The City Turbo's suspension was more refined than that of the ordinary City. The four-wheel independent system used progressive rate coil springs, with stabilizers at both the front and the rear. The tires used were 165/70HR12 radials, and it had ventilated disc brakes at the front and semi-metallic drum brakes at the rear. The Turbo II's flared fenders were necessary to accommodate a 30 mm (20 mm in the rear) wider track and larger 185/60R13 tires.

=== Styling and interior ===
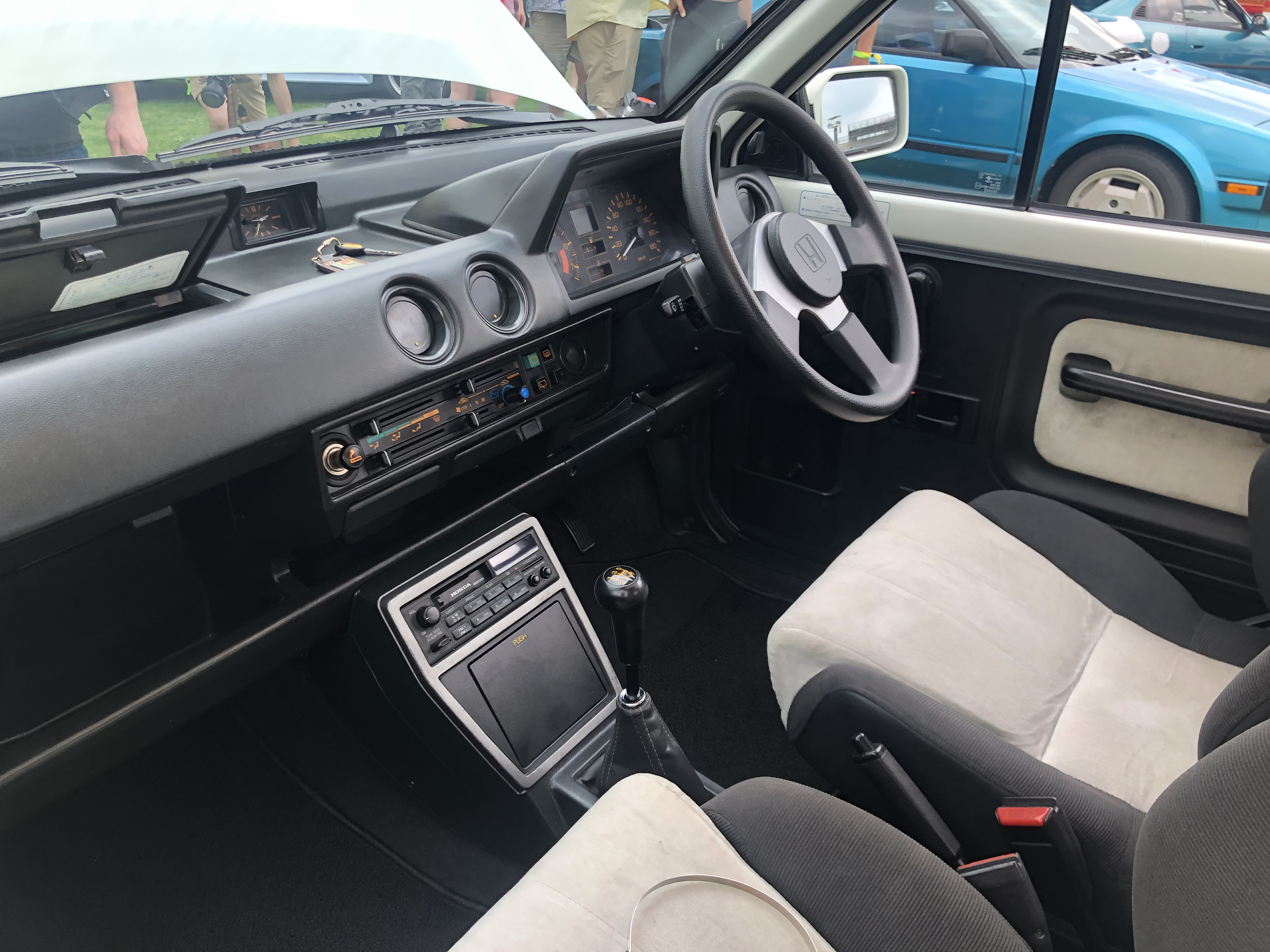
Honda City Turbo II interior

The body of the Honda City Turbo was made sportier by the addition of a new air dam with fog lights and an asymmetrical grille, and a small spoiler at the top/rear of the car. Meanwhile, a power bulge was added to the hood to make room for the extra equipment of the turbocharged engine. In addition to flared fenders and "Turbo II Intercooler" graphics, the Turbo II also had a larger power bulge, body-colored bumpers, and a pair of vents ahead of the rear wheels.

Interior appointments to the Turbo focused both on driver involvement and comfort. A digital speedometer, surrounded by a tachometer and a boost gauge, replaced the regular analog instrument cluster, and was used until the March 1985 facelift, after which the analog assembly from the regular City was used. Form-fitting leather and moquette bucket seats were made standard as well, and a special "sonic seat" was available, which responded to the audio system by a transducer sending sound and vibration to the user through the seat. An extra thick, three-spoke steering wheel was also standard for the Turbo.

== Specifications ==
Honda City (1981–1986)
Version	City E, U, R with A/T (AA)	City R, Manhattan Roof (AA)	City Pro (VF)	City Cabriolet (FA)	City Turbo (AA)	City Turbo II "Bulldog" (FA)
Engine	1,2 Liter (1231 cc) Inline-four, 12 valve CVCC-II SOHC
Aspiration	single two-barrel Keihin carburetor				PGM-FI, turbocharged	PGM-FI, turbocharged and intercooled
Power	63 PS (46 kW; 62 hp) at 5000 rpm	67 PS (49 kW; 66 hp) at 5500 rpm	61 PS (45 kW; 60 hp) at 5000 rpm	67 PS (49 kW; 66 hp) at 5500 rpm (AT: 63 PS)	100 PS (74 kW; 99 hp) at 5500 rpm	110 PS (81 kW; 108 hp) at 5500 rpm
Torque	10.0 kg⋅m (98 N⋅m; 72 lb⋅ft) at 3000 rpm	10.0 kg⋅m (98 N⋅m; 72 lb⋅ft) at 3500 rpm	9.8 kg⋅m (96 N⋅m; 71 lb⋅ft) at 3000 rpm	10.0 kg⋅m (98 N⋅m; 72 lb⋅ft) at 3500 rpm (AT at 3000 rpm)	15.0 kg⋅m (147 N⋅m; 108 lb⋅ft) at 3000 rpm	16.3 kg⋅m (160 N⋅m; 118 lb⋅ft) at 3000 rpm
Top Speed	141 km/h (88 mph)	150 km/h (93 mph)	135 km/h (84 mph)	150 km/h (93 mph)	179 km/h (111 mph)	175 km/h (109 mph)
Acceleration 0–100 km/h (0–62 mph)	12.9 sec	n/a	13.1 sec	13.7 sec	8.6 sec	n/a
Empty Weight	655–710 kg (1,444–1,565 lb)	685–710 kg (1,510–1,565 lb)	635–660 kg (1,400–1,455 lb)	800–810 kg (1,764–1,786 lb)	690–700 kg (1,521–1,543 lb)	735–745 kg (1,620–1,642 lb)
Fuel tank size	41 L
Luggage space	205 L			182 L	205 L
Wheelbase	2,220 mm (87.4 in)
Track (F/R)	1,370 / 1,370 mm			1,400 / 1,390 mm	1,370 / 1,370 mm	1,400 / 1,390 mm
Length/Width/ Height (mm)	3,380 / 1,570 / 1,470 (Manhattan Roof: 1,570)			3,420 / 1,625 / 1,470	3,380 / 1,570 / 1,460	3,420 / 1,625 / 1,470

== In popular culture ==
The Madness song "In the City" was written as a jingle for a 1981 Japanese television advertisement for the Honda City and later expanded into a 3-minute track.

In the 1984 animated television series The Transformers, the City was used as the alternate mode for the character Skids, who was based on the blue variant of the Diaclone Car Robot "No.9: Honda City Turbo" figure. On November 20th of 2021, Japanese toy company Takara Tomy would release a Masterpiece, High-end collectable figure of Skids in collaboration with Honda to celebrate the 40th Anniversary of the 1st generation Honda City Turbo after initial reveal of the figure at the start of the same year

In the video game City Connection, the protagonist drives a Honda City.
