= Felipe Massa =

Brazilian racing driver (born 1981)

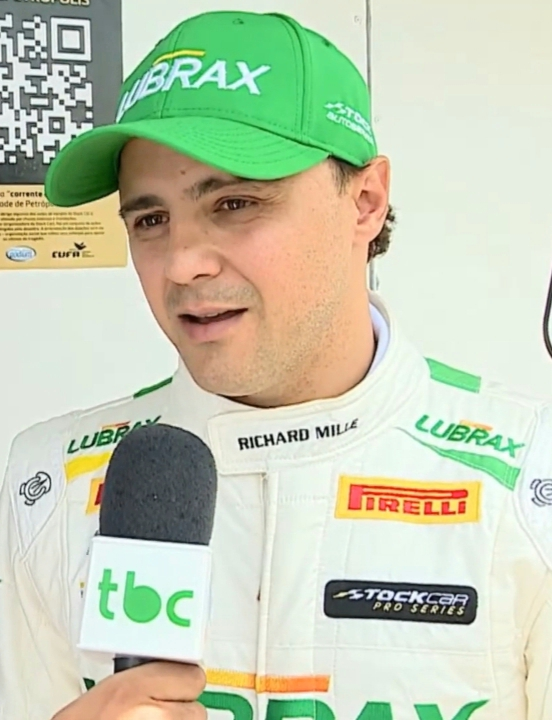
- Massa in 2022
- Born: 25 April 1981 (age 45); São Paulo, Brazil
- Spouse: Anna Raffaela Bassi (m. 2007)
- Children: 1

Formula One World Championship career
- Nationality: (Brazil) Brazilian
- Active years: 2002, 2004–2017
- Team(s): Sauber, Ferrari, Williams
- Car number: 19
- Entries: 272 (269 starts)
- Championships: 0
- Wins: 11
- Podiums: 41
- Career points: 1167
- Pole positions: 16
- Fastest laps: 15
- First entry: 2002 Australian Grand Prix
- First win: 2006 Turkish Grand Prix
- Last win: 2008 Brazilian Grand Prix
- Last entry: 2017 Abu Dhabi Grand Prix

Awards
- 2007: Lorenzo Bandini Trophy

Felipe Massa (Brazilian Portuguese: [feˈlipi ˈmasɐ, fiˈ-]; born 25 April 1981) is a Brazilian racing driver, who competes in the Stock Car Pro Series for TMG and in the IMSA SportsCar Championship for Riley. Massa competed in Formula One from 2002 to 2017, and was runner-up in the World Drivers' Championship in 2008 with Ferrari; he won 11 Grands Prix across 15 seasons.

Born in São Paulo and raised in Botucatu, Massa started his career in karting aged eight, winning national and regional championships before progressing to junior formulae in 1998. Massa won several championships in Formula Chevrolet and Formula Renault, before winning the Euro Formula 3000 Championship in 2001 with Draco. Massa signed for Sauber in 2002 to partner Nick Heidfeld, making his Formula One debut at the Australian Grand Prix. Despite scoring several points finishes in his rookie season, Massa was replaced by Heinz-Harald Frentzen in 2003 and became a test driver for Ferrari. Massa returned to Sauber the following year, remaining with the team for two seasons before signing with Ferrari in 2006 to partner Michael Schumacher. Massa took his maiden win from pole position at the Turkish Grand Prix, and became the first Brazilian driver since Ayrton Senna to win his home Grand Prix. He then took several wins in a four-way title battle with Lewis Hamilton, Fernando Alonso and new teammate Kimi Räikkönen, with the latter taking the championship. Massa took six wins in his 2008 campaign, but lost the World Drivers' Championship by one point to Hamilton on the last lap of the last race of the season. Details later emerged of race-fixing at the Singapore Grand Prix—commonly known as Crashgate—that Massa claims lost him the title, taking legal action against the FIA in 2023, which was to go to trial in 2026.

At the 2009 Hungarian Grand Prix, Massa was seriously injured during qualifying when a suspension spring from the Brawn BGP 001 of Rubens Barrichello struck his helmet at 162 mph (261 km/h), and was replaced by Luca Badoer and Giancarlo Fisichella for the remainder of the 2009 season. Massa returned to Ferrari in 2010 to partner Fernando Alonso, briefly leading the championship after the Malaysian Grand Prix. After struggling for form over the next three seasons, Massa left Ferrari at the conclusion of his 2013 campaign, having contributed to two World Constructors' Championships. Massa partnered Valtteri Bottas at Williams in 2014, taking his first pole position in six years at the Austrian Grand Prix amongst several podiums. He took multiple podiums the following season with Williams, before announcing his retirement at the end of 2016. The abrupt retirement of Nico Rosberg, however, saw Bottas move to Mercedes and Massa postpone his retirement to the end of the 2017 season, having achieved 11 wins, 16 pole positions, 15 fastest laps and 41 podiums in Formula One.

Outside of Formula One, Massa competed in Formula E from 2018 to 2020 for Venturi, and has competed in the Stock Car Pro Series in Brazil since 2018. He also entered the Porsche Carrera Cup Brasil in 2020 alongside Lico Kaesemodel. In kart racing, Massa hosted the charity Desafio Internacional das Estrelas race until 2014, and was the president of the Commission Internationale de Karting from 2017 to 2022.

== Early life ==
Massa was born in São Paulo and grew up in Botucatu, in São Paulo countryside. He is of Italian descent. His grandparents came from the town of Cerignola, located in the province of Foggia, Italy.

Massa began karting when he was eight years old, finishing fourth in his first season. He continued in national and international championships for seven years, and in 1998 moved into Formula Chevrolet, finishing the Brazilian championship in fifth place. During the following season, he won three of the ten races and claimed the championship.

In 2000, Massa moved to Europe to compete in the Italian Formula Renault series, winning both the Italian and the European Formula Renault championships that year. He could have moved to Formula Three, but instead chose the Euro Formula 3000, where he won six of the eight races and the 2001 championship. He was then offered a Formula 1 test with the Sauber team, who signed him for 2002. He also drove for Alfa Romeo in the European Touring Car Championship as a guest driver.

== Formula One career ==
=== Sauber (2002, 2004–2005) ===
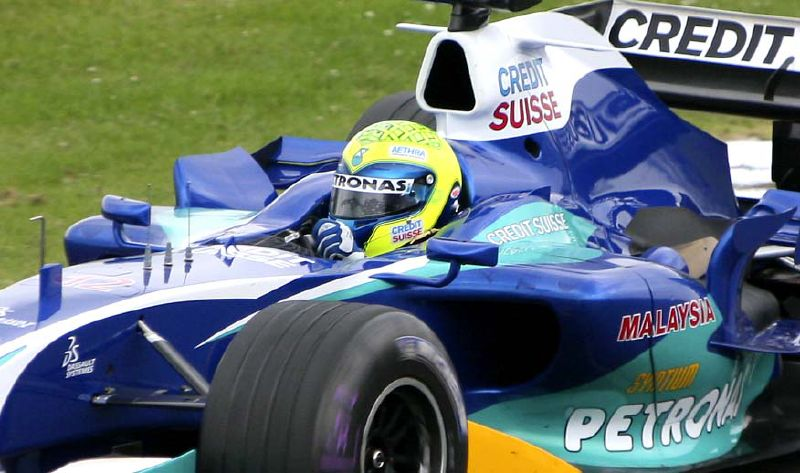
Massa driving for Sauber at the 2005 British Grand Prix

In his rookie year in Formula 1, Massa was paired with 1999 International Formula 3000 champion Nick Heidfeld. He proved he was a competitive driver, but made several mistakes, including spinning off the track several times. Nevertheless, Massa scored four championship points in his first season, his best result a fifth place at the Spanish Grand Prix at the Circuit de Catalunya. After picking up a ten-place grid drop for an incident during the Italian Grand Prix, he was dropped for the United States Grand Prix in an attempt to circumnavigate the penalty, being replaced by Heinz-Harald Frentzen. Massa returned to the driver's seat for the Japanese Grand Prix, but Sauber confirmed that Frentzen would partner Heidfeld in 2003, leaving Massa without a race seat. Instead, he spent a year with Sauber's engine suppliers, Ferrari, gaining experience by testing for the championship-winning team.

Sauber then re-signed Massa for the 2004 season. In 2004, he scored twelve of Sauber's 34 points, his best result being a fourth place at the Belgian Grand Prix. Giancarlo Fisichella scored the team's other 22 points. Massa remained at Sauber in 2005. Though he scored only eleven points, he outpaced his teammate Jacques Villeneuve through most of the season, and beat him in the Drivers' Championship. In an August 2022 interview, Massa revealed that after Sauber was taken over by BMW, they offered him a three-year contract with the team, however Ferrari exercised their option on him to replace the outgoing Rubens Barrichello, who had signed for Honda for the 2006 season. Massa was then released and replaced by his former teammate Heidfeld and joined Ferrari to partner Michael Schumacher.

=== Ferrari (2006–2013) ===
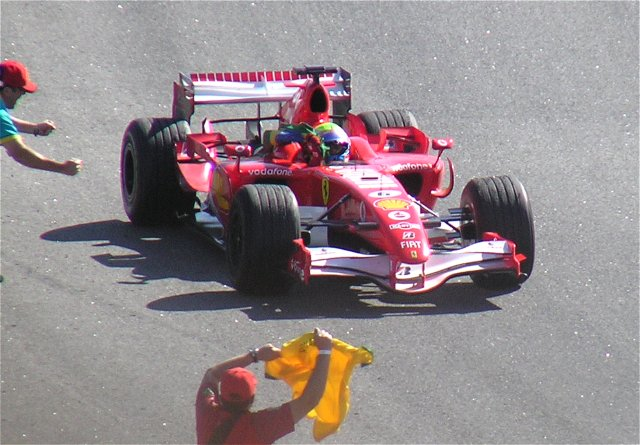
Massa celebrating victory at the 2006 Brazilian Grand Prix

==== 2006: Maiden wins ====
Massa qualified second at the opening race in Bahrain, and came from 21st position to fifth in Malaysia, beating teammate Michael Schumacher, who had started from 14th. In Bahrain, however, in both Saturday practice and the race, Massa spun, narrowly missing Fernando Alonso, the eventual winner of the race. At the Australian GP he crashed his Ferrari in qualifying, then collided with Christian Klien and Nico Rosberg at the first corner of the race. Nevertheless, he scored his first career podium at the Nürburgring, finishing third behind Michael Schumacher and Alonso. He also set the fastest lap at Barcelona in 2006. He had four more podium finishes in 2006, and took his first F1 pole position and his first F1 win at the Turkish Grand Prix at the Istanbul Park circuit.

Originally, Ferrari had intended to use Massa only for the 2006 season, for they had already signed McLaren's Kimi Räikkönen to partner Schumacher for the 2007 season in 2005. However his future at Ferrari was secured when Schumacher announced in September 2006 that he would retire from Formula One at the end of the season. On 22 October, Massa won his home race at the Brazilian Grand Prix, the first time a Brazilian driver had won at Interlagos since Ayrton Senna in 1993. Massa finished the season third with 80 points, behind world champion Alonso and Ferrari teammate Schumacher.

==== 2007 ====
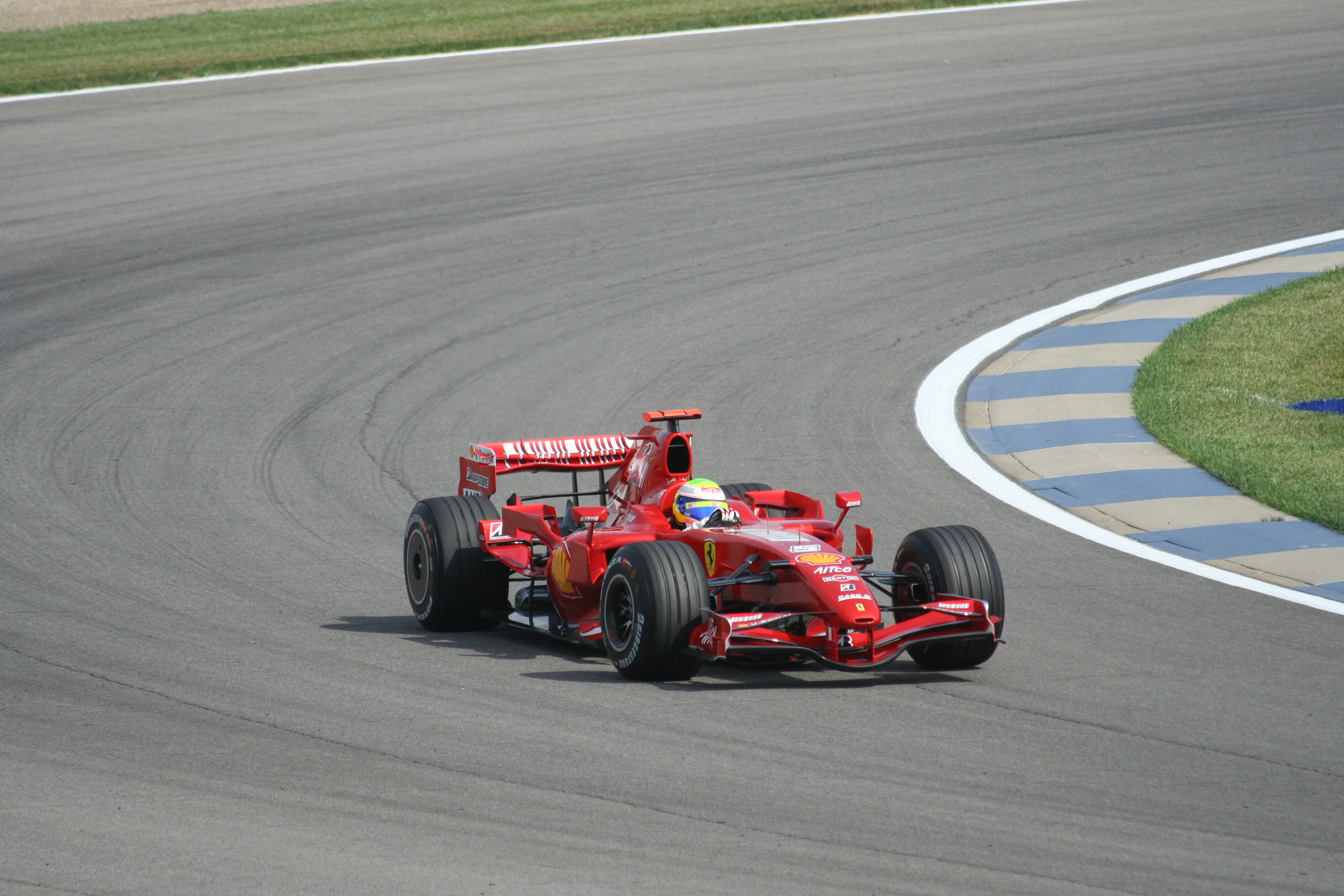
Massa driving for Ferrari at the 2007 United States Grand Prix

Massa topped the time sheets on five occasions and set the fastest lap for four circuits during the 2007 pre-season testing. However, his 2007 season began with problems. At the season opening Australian Grand Prix, he suffered a gearbox problem during qualifying and required an engine change. Massa started the race from 22nd position due to these problems and a ten-grid-slot penalty for the engine change. He employed a one pitstop strategy for the race and finished in sixth place. Massa's problems continued in Malaysia, where despite qualifying on pole position, the McLarens of Fernando Alonso and Lewis Hamilton overtook him at turn one. Massa ran off the track while attempting to overtake Hamilton, and lost two more places, dropping down to fifth place, where he finished the race. However, his season subsequently improved, as he won the Grands Prix of Bahrain and Spain, both from pole position, and finished third in Monaco. The race stewards at the Canadian Grand Prix disqualified Massa for leaving the pit lane while the red light was showing. After this disqualification, he won one more race at the Turkish Grand Prix, and finished on the podium at six more races, including a second-place finish at his home Grand Prix at the Brazilian Grand Prix. Massa led much of the Brazilian Grand Prix, until yielding the lead to teammate Kimi Räikkönen, thus securing Räikkönen's world championship title. Massa finished the 2007 season ranked fourth in the drivers' standing with 94 points.

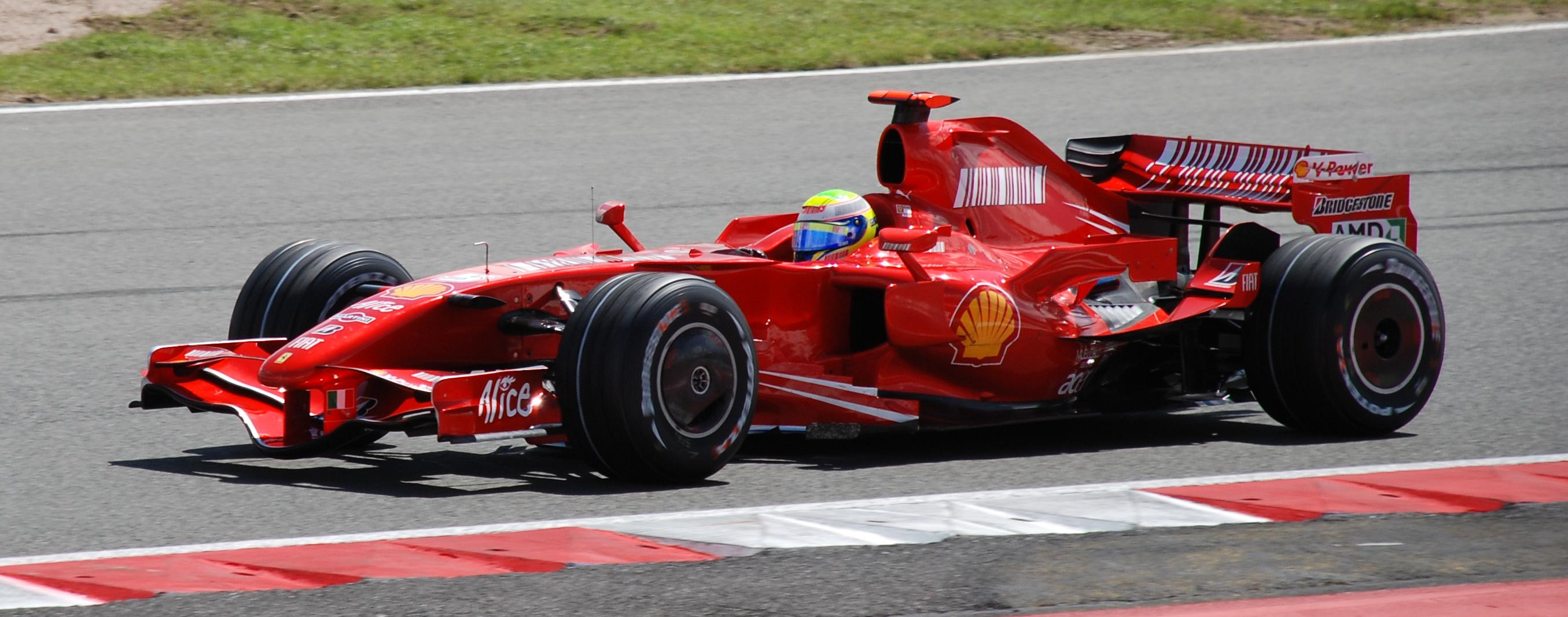
Massa driving for Ferrari at the 2007 British Grand Prix

In October 2007, Massa extended his contract with Ferrari to the end of 2010.

==== 2008: Championship runner up ====
Ferrari appeared off the pace at the first race of 2008 in Australia. Massa qualified fourth, but spun off at the first corner of the first lap. On lap 26, he collided with David Coulthard and eventually retired due to engine failure.

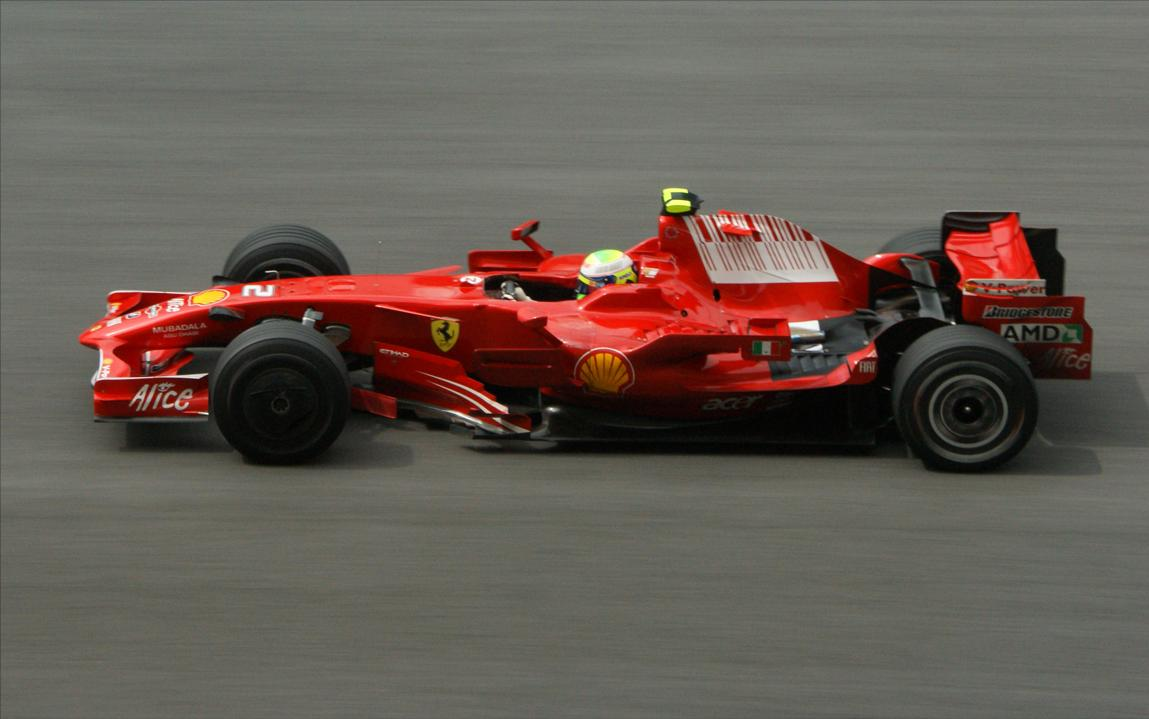
Massa driving for Ferrari at the 2008 Malaysian Grand Prix

In Malaysia, Massa qualified on pole, half a second clear of Räikkönen in second. He led from pole for the first 16 laps but was jumped by Räikkönen in the pitstops. He was still in contention for the victory battle and was chasing Räikkönen until he spun off and retired on lap 31 while in second.

Massa went into the Bahrain Grand Prix (where he had won in 2007) with no points. Robert Kubica beat him to pole in qualifying. but at the start, Massa passed Kubica before the first corner. Räikkönen soon got up to second but he could not do a repeat of Malaysia. Massa was quicker and won by 3 seconds to score his first points of the season.

In Spain, Massa qualified third behind Räikkönen and Fernando Alonso. He passed Alonso at the start and got up to second behind Räikkönen. He stayed on his teammate's tail for the whole race, but was unable to pass or get ahead in the stops.

Massa took pole position at the next round at Turkey. He led from the start, and maintained the lead during the round of pit stops, but was passed by Lewis Hamilton's three-stopping McLaren at the start of the second stint. Hamilton pulled away, but he did not have the pace to take the lead that was needed to make his third stop and still come out ahead of Massa. Massa was seven seconds up the road by then and took his second win of the season, and his third consecutive at the circuit.

At Monaco, Massa qualified on pole and built up a fifteen-second lead over Räikkönen in the rain, before that advantage was wiped out by the safety car. Soon Räikkönen was out of contention with a drive-through penalty. After the safety car came in, Massa again started pulling away from Robert Kubica, but he ran up an escape road and lost the lead. Massa did jump Kubica in the pitstops, but Lewis Hamilton's one-stopping McLaren was by now ahead of both of them. During the pit stops, Massa was fuelled to the end of the race and was struggling, holding Kubica up. The track dried out and Massa had to pit for slick tyres while Kubica took his second fuel stop at the same time and jumped him. Massa thus finished third behind Hamilton and Kubica.

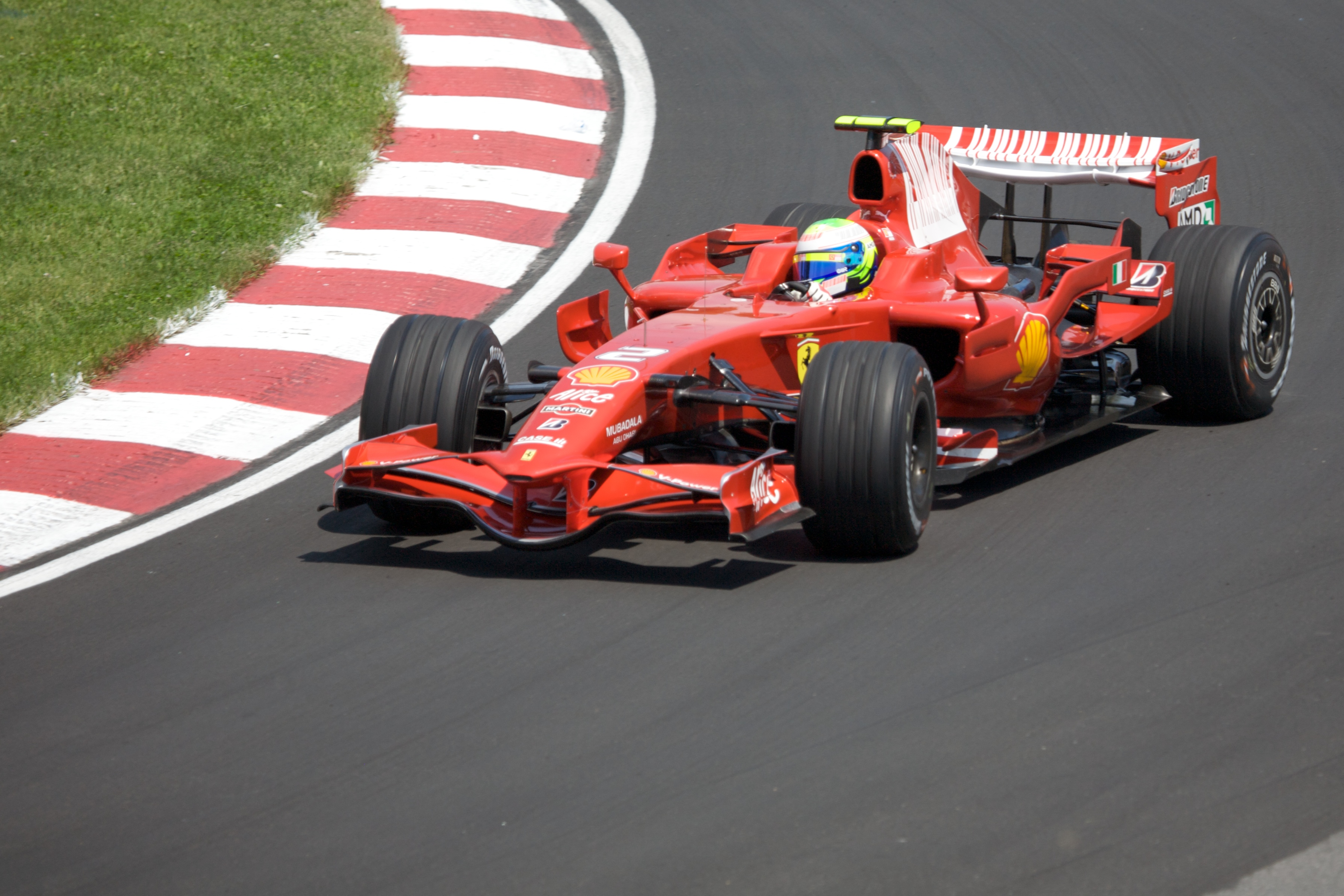
Massa driving for Ferrari at the 2008 Canadian Grand Prix

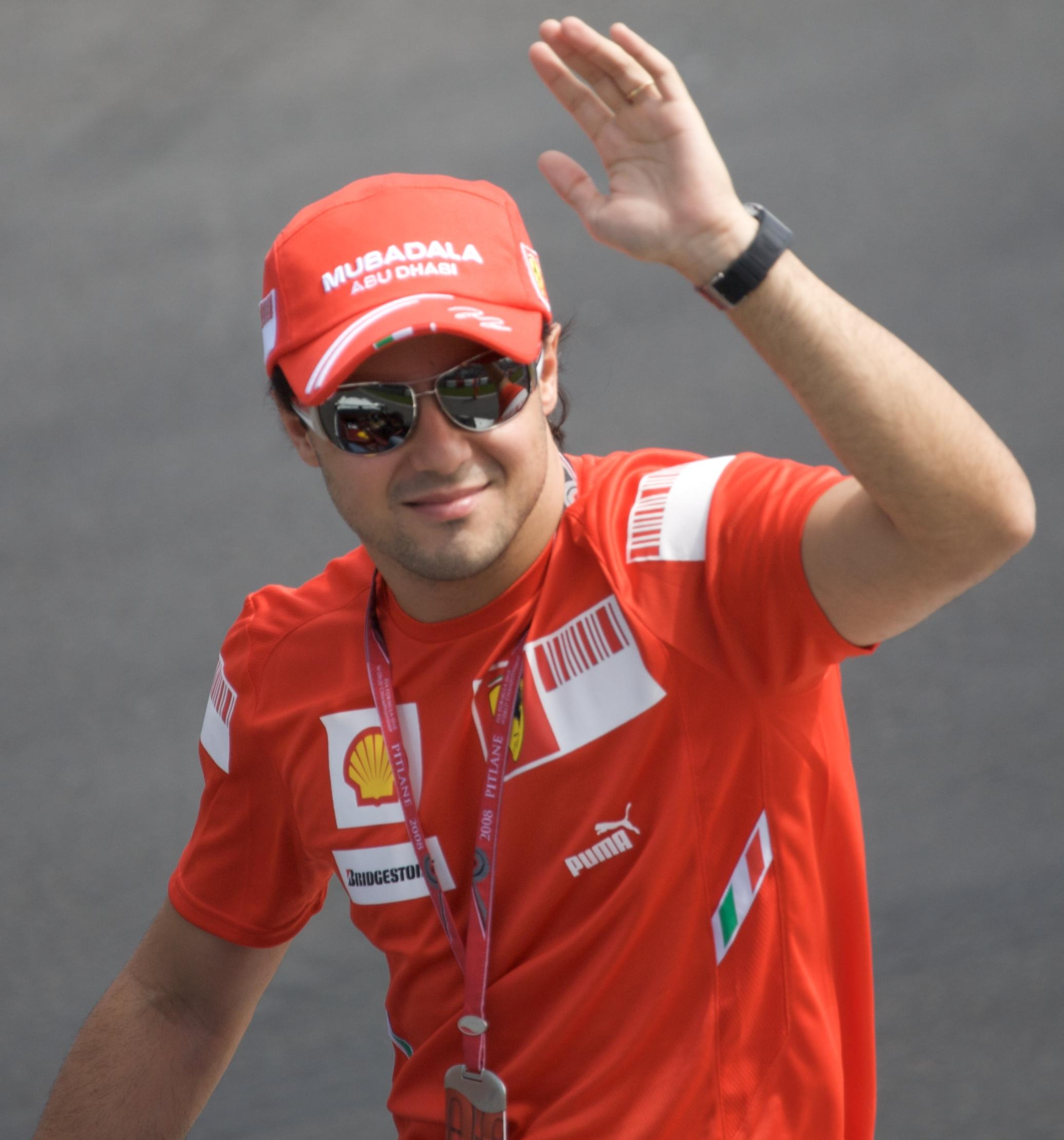
Massa at the 2008 Canadian Grand Prix

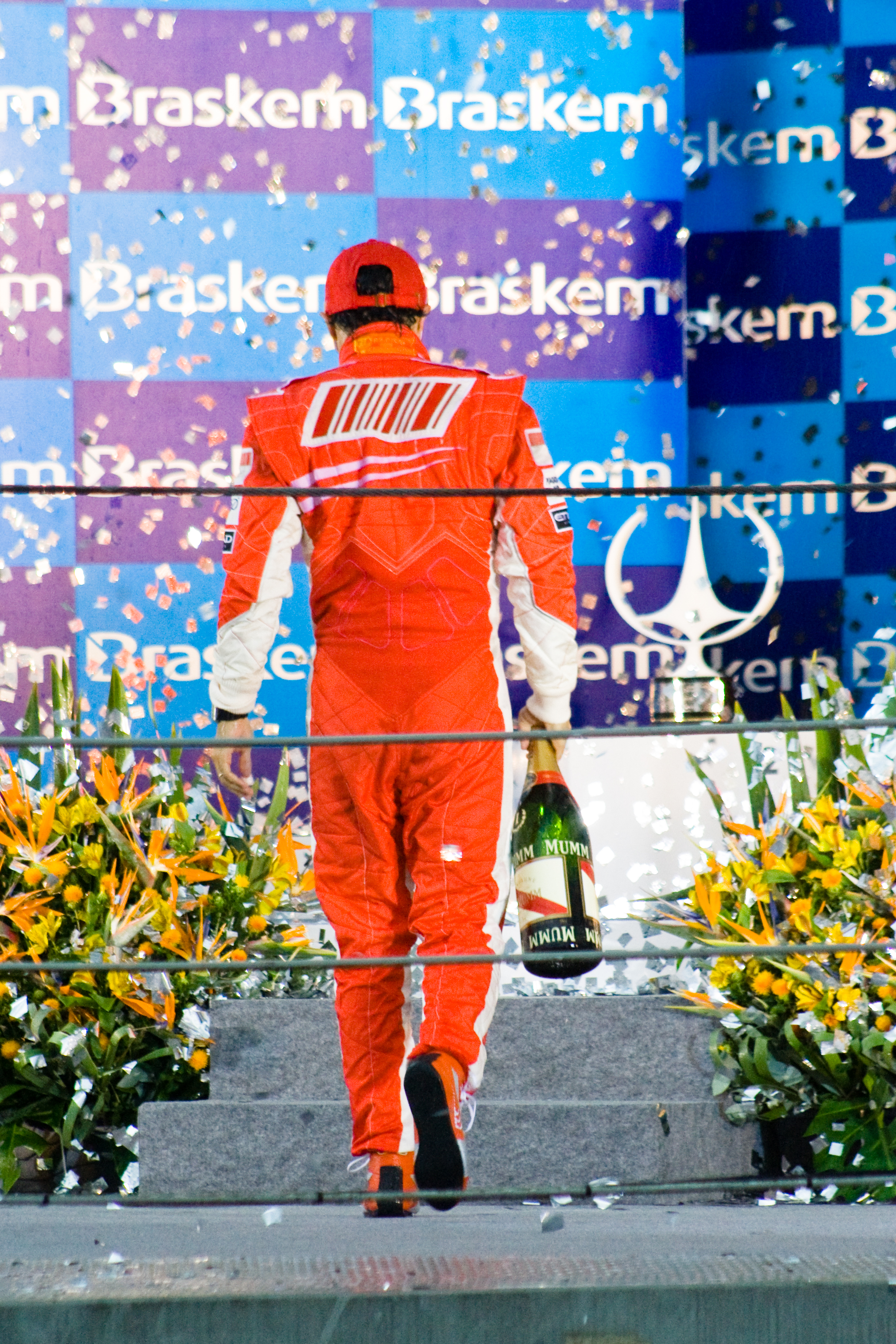
Massa on the podium at the 2008 Brazilian Grand Prix

In the Canadian Grand Prix, Massa qualified in sixth place. In the race there was a safety car due to an incident involving Adrian Sutil. All drivers pitted, but Massa had to pit twice due to a delay with his fuel rig, which put him down to 17th. He then staged a fightback, charging back up to fifth place by the end of the race. Two of Massa's title contenders failed to finish after Hamilton collided with a stationary Räikkönen in the pitlane, allowing Massa to equal Hamilton and overtake Räikkönen in the driver standings.

In the French Grand Prix, Massa qualified second on the grid behind his teammate Räikkönen. Massa stayed some 3 to 4 seconds behind his teammate for the first half of the race. However, Räikkönen had a developing problem in his exhaust system, which allowed Massa to overtake him and win the race. This win gave Massa the lead in the championship, two points ahead of Robert Kubica, five points ahead of Räikkönen and 10 points ahead of Hamilton. Massa was the first Brazilian to lead the championship since Ayrton Senna in 1993.

In the British Grand Prix, Massa set the quickest time in first practice but immediately crashed. He had his season's worst qualifying, starting in ninth. In the wet race, while Hamilton dominated and Räikkönen finished fourth, Massa spun five times and finished last in 13th, over a lap down behind both his rivals. And so, at the end of the halfway stage of the season, Hamilton, Massa and Räikkönen were deadlocked on 48 points, with Robert Kubica only two points behind them.

The tenth round of the season was in Germany. Massa qualified second behind Hamilton. He stayed second and was set to finish there until a crash involving Timo Glock brought out the safety car. Due to a miscommunication, Hamilton stayed out while the others, led by Massa pitted. However, when all the stops were over, Massa was behind Nelson Piquet Jr. who had already pitted as he was on a one-stopper. Then, when a charging Hamilton came at him in the last 10 laps, Massa could not hold him off and subsequently finished third. After the race, Massa was four points behind Hamilton but three ahead of Räikkönen.

At the Hungarian Grand Prix, the McLarens locked out the front row, and the best Massa could get was third. However, at the start itself, Massa passed both Heikki Kovalainen and pole sitter Hamilton on the run down to the first corner. He had the race in control from that point, and built up a five-second lead over Hamilton. When Hamilton suffered a puncture, Massa was left 20 seconds in front, but with three laps remaining he suffered an engine failure and retired.

The twelfth round of the season, the European Grand Prix was in Valencia, Spain. Massa took pole position comfortably at this new circuit, and led from the start. However, during one of his pit stops he was released early and almost touched wheels with Adrian Sutil who was already coming down the pitlane. Massa won the race and also set the fastest lap. After the race, the stewards decided to fine Massa €10,000 for the incident with Sutil, but the victory stood and he was only six points behind Hamilton as well as being seven ahead of Räikkönen. The race was Massa's 100th Grand Prix entry.

The next race was Belgium, Massa qualified second behind Hamilton. He lost a place at the start to Räikkönen and stayed in third until lap 42 of 44 when Hamilton passed Räikkönen for the lead, just after cutting a chicane. The two had more battles throughout that lap, which resulted in Räikkönen crashing out, promoting Massa to second, despite the Brazilian dropping nine seconds on the last lap. Hamilton crossed the line first, but was penalised 25 seconds by the stewards after the race for cutting the chicane, and so the win went to Massa putting him only two points behind Hamilton.

At Italy, Ferrari's home race, the weekend was wet throughout, and Massa qualified only sixth, but Hamilton was down in 15th. During the race, Massa got up to third, but dropped to sixth after he pitted once more than most others. He finished there, but as Hamilton only finished seventh, he narrowed Hamilton's championship lead to a single point.

Massa took pole position for what was the first ever F1 night race and inaugural Singapore Grand Prix, beating Hamilton by six-tenths of a second. He maintained the lead at the start and after 14 laps, was over 5 seconds ahead of Hamilton. However, a crash for Nelson Piquet Jr. brought out the safety car, bunching up all the cars. It was then time for the first round of stops and during his stop, Massa was given the green light to go, but the refueller was still refuelling the car. Massa left with the fuel rig attached and so had to stop at the end of the pitlane. The mechanics ran the length of the pitlane and finally removed the rig, but Massa was now last. He was then given a drive-through penalty for an unsafe release, and was fifteen seconds behind the rest of the field. His race ruined, he finished 13th and Hamilton who finished third was now seven points ahead of him.

At the Japanese Grand Prix, Massa qualified fifth on the grid, while Hamilton took pole position. At the start, there was an incident between Hamilton and Räikkönen, dropping the former to sixth. Massa stayed fifth, a place in front of his rival. On the second lap, as Massa was stuck behind the slower car of Jarno Trulli, Hamilton tried to pass him. The result was a collision, with Hamilton spinning down to the back, and Massa dropping down to seventh. He was given a drive-through penalty for the incident, and found himself in 14th. He made a charge up the order, setting the fastest lap on his way to getting eighth and one point. This became seventh after a 25-second time penalty was issued to Sébastien Bourdais, who was judged by the stewards to have caused a collision with Massa whilst exiting the pitlane.

At the Chinese Grand Prix the following week, Massa and teammate Räikkönen struggled for pace the entire weekend, a situation which Ferrari team principal Stefano Domenicali could not explain. Massa qualified third behind Räikkönen's Ferrari and title rival Hamilton. Following the pattern of the weekend Massa struggled to keep up with Hamilton, who raced away and maintained a comfortable margin. Whilst he eventually found some speed after the graining period on the medium compound tyres, he was unable to catch Hamilton. As Räikkönen yielded second place to keep Massa's title hopes alive, Hamilton pulled his lead out to seven points in the Drivers' Championship.

Massa remained optimistic, stating "For sure we are in a difficult position but we know many things can happen in one race" and "Always when you play at home you usually play better"; in the previous two years he had taken a win and a second place at Interlagos. At the last race of the season, the Brazilian Grand Prix, Massa was seven points behind Lewis Hamilton, meaning that Massa had to either finish first or second to win, and Hamilton had to be outside the top 5 – the same position Räikkönen had been in a year earlier, when he won the championship.

Massa qualified on pole, while Räikkönen qualified third, just ahead of Hamilton. There was a rain shower just before the start of the race, and all drivers started on intermediates. Massa maintained the lead, and after 10 laps everyone had to change to slicks on a drying track. Although the order was shuffled, Massa still led. He dominated the rest of the race, set the fastest lap and won by thirteen seconds even though everyone had to change to intermediates after a late rain shower. Hamilton, meanwhile, struggled for pace. He was lying fourth for most of the race until the late shower, behind Massa, Alonso and Räikkönen. During the late shower, Timo Glock gambled on staying out on drys. He was fourth with Hamilton fifth. With three laps to go, Massa still led with Hamilton fifth, which would be enough for Hamilton to win the Championship. But Hamilton then made a mistake and was passed by Sebastian Vettel, demoting him to sixth and handing the Championship advantage to Massa. Massa secured the win, while Hamilton was still sixth as he came up to the second-to-last corner. He then passed Glock who had just been overtaken by Vettel and who was struggling for grip on his dry tyres, and so moved back into fifth place. This was enough to secure him the Drivers title by a single point. If he had tied points with Massa, by virtue of six victories to five in the season, Massa would have won the title.

Following the 2008 seasons, F1.com called Massa "no more the nearly man", saying "No more the Ferrari number two, Massa is now a contender". His maturity was also praised by Ferrari President Luca di Montezemolo, commenting "I can only imagine how painful that moment must have been for him. However, I would like to give him my very special compliments, not only for dominating the running out there on the track in front of his fans, proving he is worthy indeed of the world title, but also for his maturity and sportsmanship off the track. He's a great champion and a great man."

==== 2009 ====
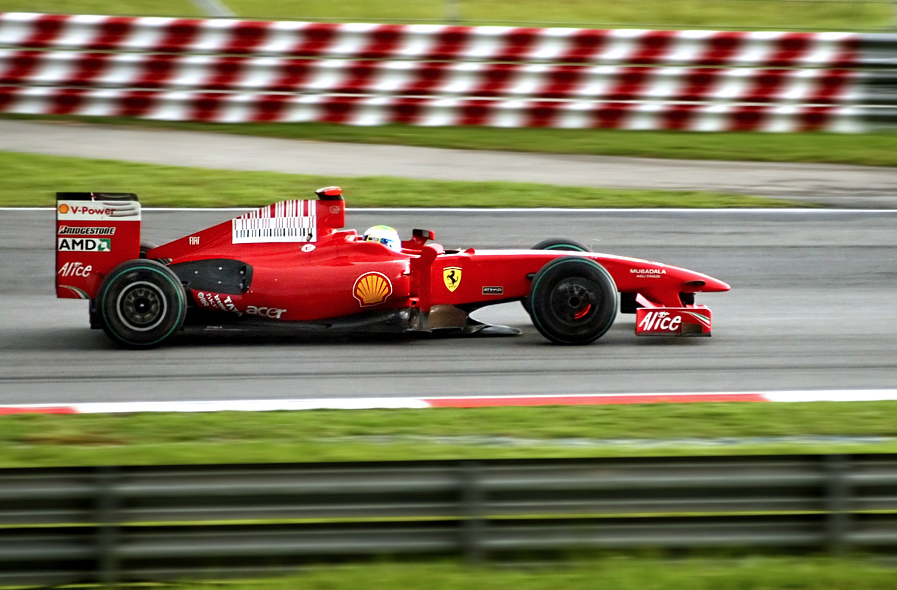
Massa at the 2009 Malaysian Grand Prix.

Massa gave Ferrari's 2009 challenger – the F60 – its shakedown test at Mugello on 12 January 2009.

Ferrari confirmed that it would equip the F60 with KERS several days before the season opening Australian Grand Prix. Friday practice session did not begin so well for Massa as he recorded the seventh and tenth fastest times. Saturday qualifying fared little better as he lined up seventh (although was promoted to sixth as Glock's Toyota was disqualified). In the race the Ferrari's poor ability to handle its tyres lead to their aggressive race strategy of super soft/medium/medium compounds paying little dividends after the first six laps (where the Ferraris moved to the front of the pack). Although Massa managed to stay in the top-three for the first half of the race, the exceptionally quick graining of the super soft tyres forced him into a three stop strategy. Before he was able to complete the race a mechanical problem forced him to retire.

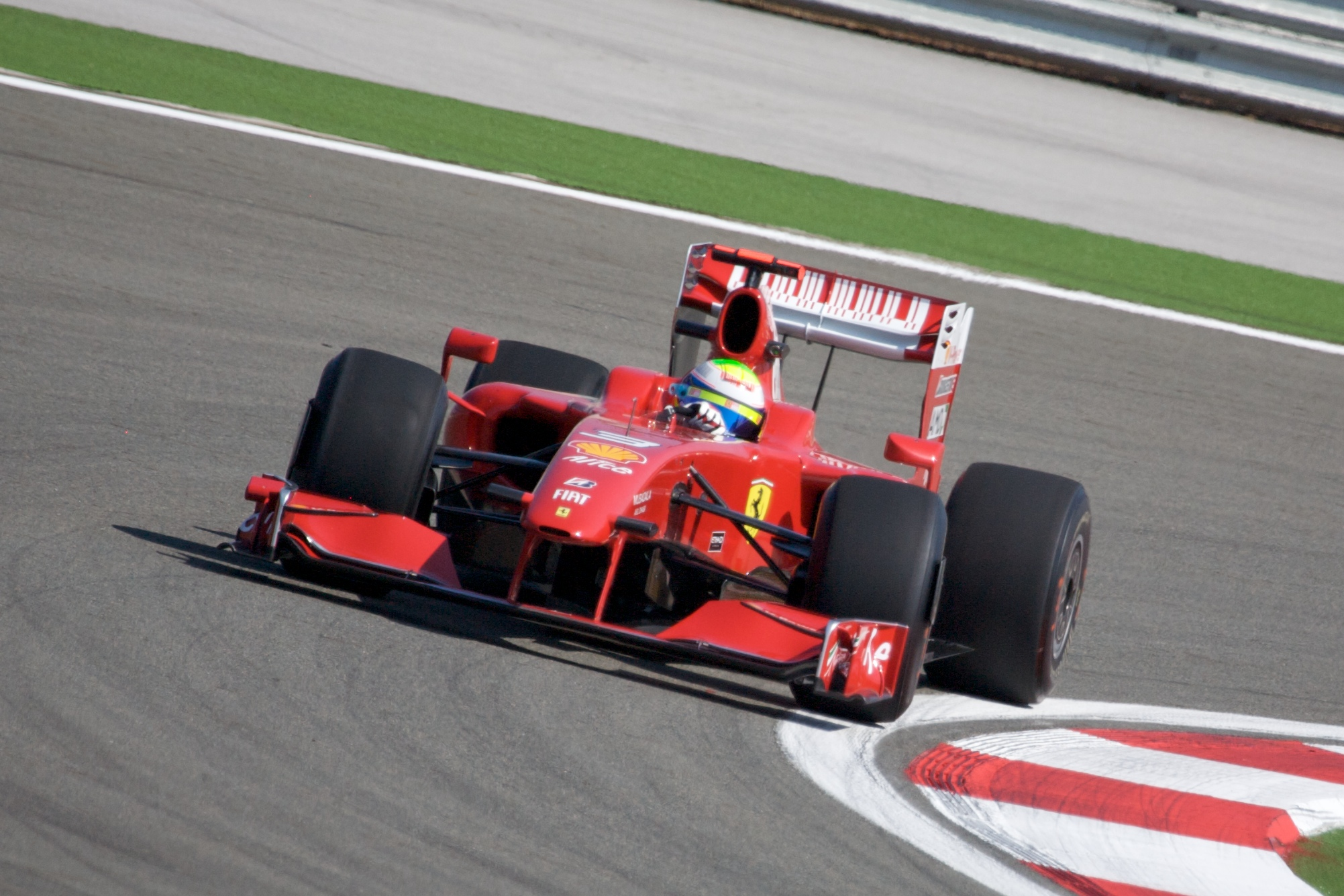
Massa at the 2009 Turkish Grand Prix

In Malaysia, an error of judgement by Ferrari meant that Massa failed to make it through the first session of qualifying. In an interview to Rede Globo, Massa revealed that he and the team believed that his initial time was quick enough to proceed into Q2, and refrained from recording further times in order to conserve the car's engine. However, this was not the case, and Massa subsequently ended up in 16th for the race. In the race, Massa was classified as having finished in ninth, just outside the points-paying positions, after the race was abandoned on the 33rd lap due to torrential rain, poor light, and timing delays. Massa also failed to score in the next two races, retiring from the Chinese Grand Prix with electrical problems, and finishing well outside of the point scoring positions in 14th in Bahrain, due to a KERS problem and damaging his car's front-wing on the first lap.

In Spain, Ferrari arrived with an upgraded car which attempted to fix many of the flaws present in the prior races. With the new aerodynamic parts, Massa managed to qualify in fourth place. He managed to maintain third position for a majority of the race before a computer issue showed the car as having less fuel than it should have, forcing him to conserve fuel in the final ten laps, allowing Vettel and Alonso to cruise past, only for him to realise that the car had enough fuel for him not to need to conserve, after the race. The much upgraded car showed its pace by setting the third fastest time of the race after the two Brawns and in front of both Red Bull cars.

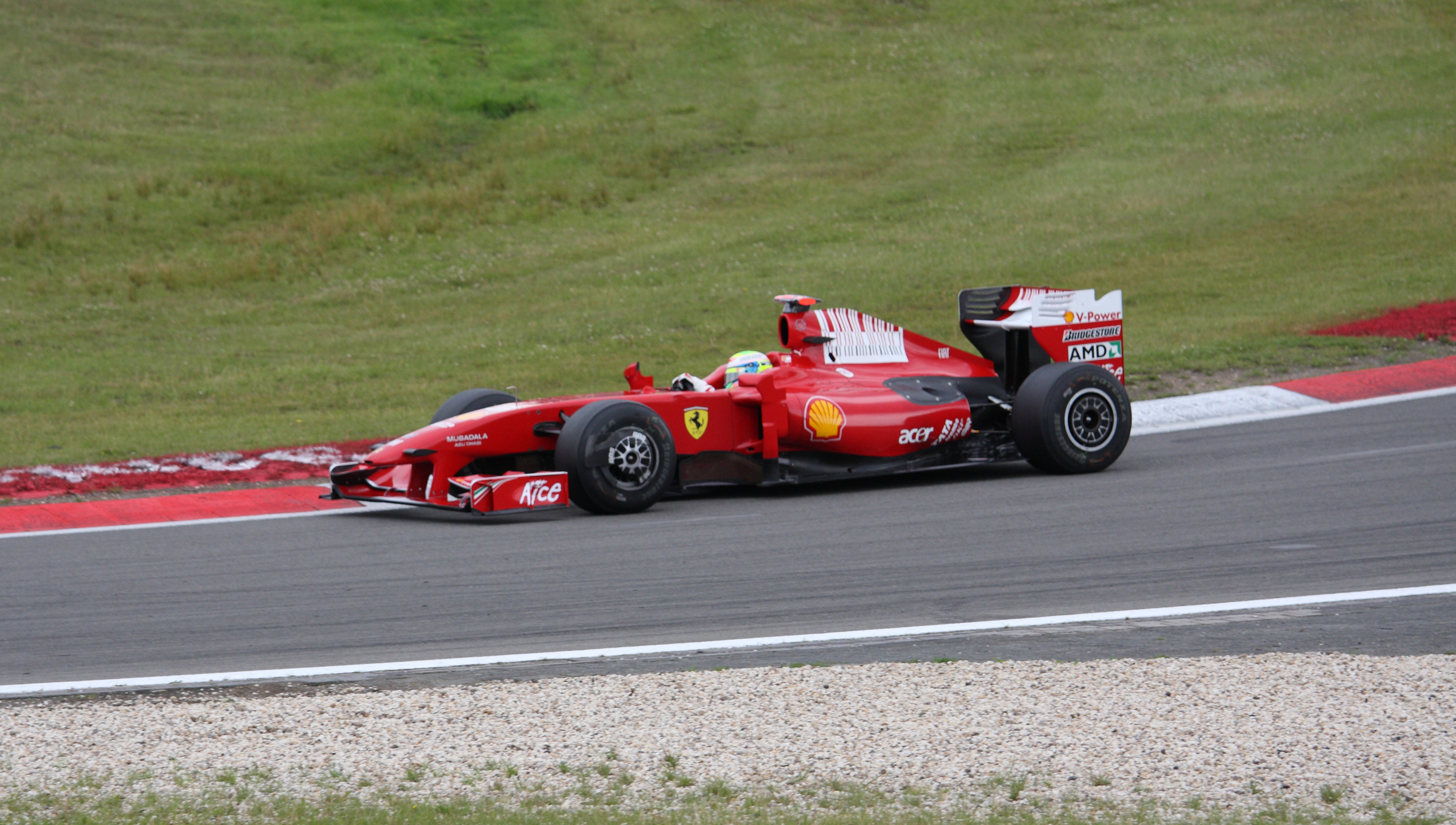
Massa at the 2009 German Grand Prix

Monaco was another step in terms of improvement for the car as Massa finished fourth in the race, with fastest race lap. After qualifying a disappointing eighth, Massa produced a mistake free drive to net his first podium position of the season with a third place at the German Grand Prix at the Nürburgring. After making a great start to fourth place, he used his fuel strategy while defending from other drivers and looking after his tyres to take the final podium place.

==== Injury ====
On 25 July 2009, in the second round of qualifying for the Hungarian Grand Prix, Massa's head, though protected by his driver's helmet, was struck by a suspension spring that had fallen from Rubens Barrichello's Brawn, on a high-speed part of the track. He subsequently crashed head-on into a tyre barrier. Massa was airlifted to the ÁEK hospital in Budapest, where he underwent surgery in the area surrounding his left eye. His condition was initially described as "life-threatening but stable", but improved rapidly. Massa was discharged from hospital the following week and returned to Brazil. After further tests it was decided Massa needed a titanium plate inserted into his skull to strengthen it for racing. Ferrari consultant and seven-time world champion Michael Schumacher was asked to take over Massa's race seat during his recovery, but his comeback was prevented by neck injuries sustained during a motorcycle accident earlier in the year. Ferrari test driver Luca Badoer was confirmed as Massa's substitute for the European and Belgian Grands Prix. After two races in which Badoer failed to score a single point, on 3 September 2009 Ferrari announced that Massa's place for the rest of the season would instead be taken by Giancarlo Fisichella who had signed a deal to be a Ferrari test driver for 2010 and had driven for Force India throughout the 2009 season.

As part of his return to Formula One Massa undertook a series of neurological examinations, co-ordinated by the FIA's medical delegate, in Paris on 10 October 2009. The successful completion of these tests led to the announcement by Ferrari that Massa would, from 12 October 2009 be driving a 2007 Formula One car in order to continue re-acclimatising to racing. He waved the chequered flag at the 2009 Brazilian Grand Prix.

==== 2010 ====
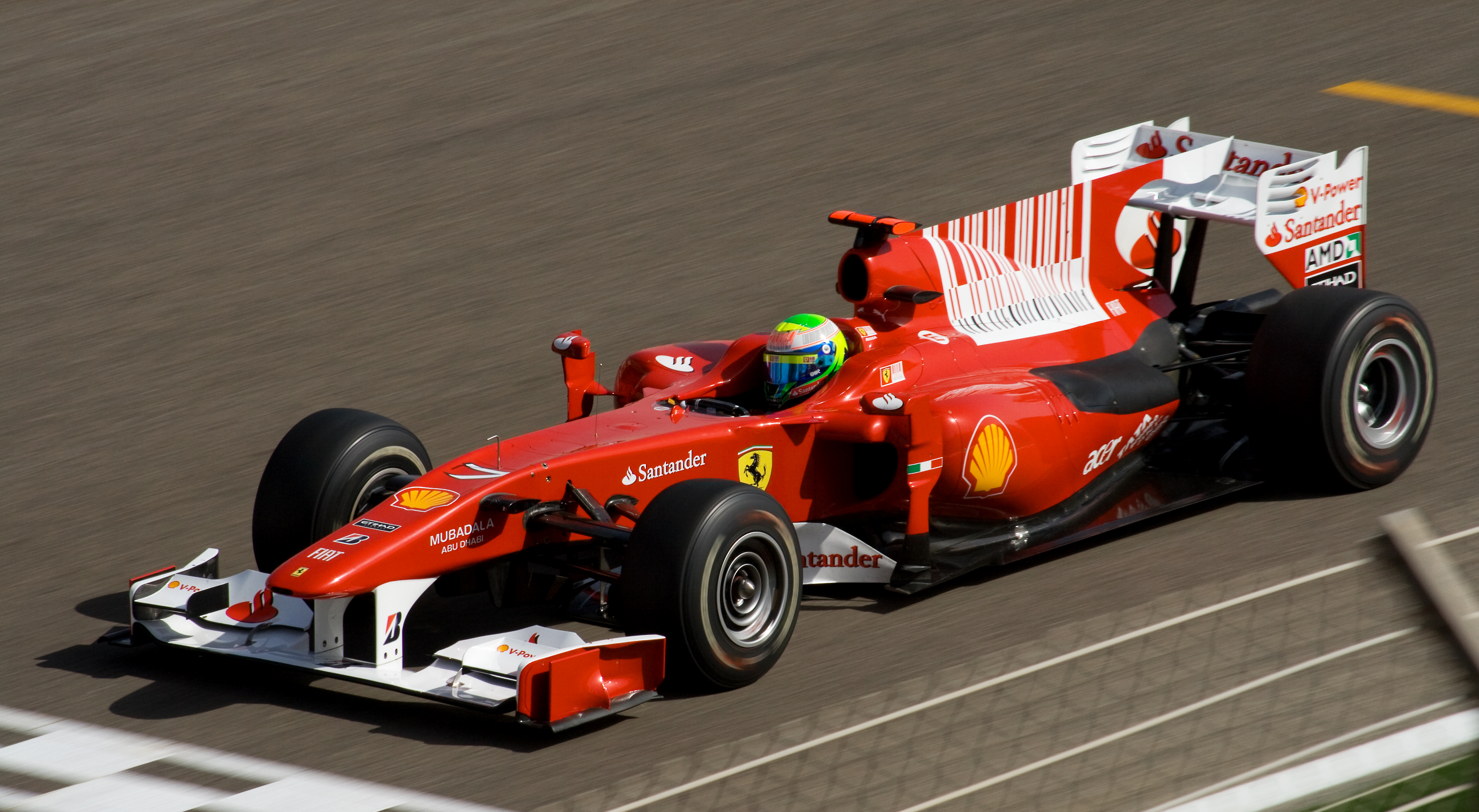
Massa at the 2010 Bahrain Grand Prix.

Massa started the 2010 season with a second-place qualifying place, and a second-place finish in Bahrain behind teammate Fernando Alonso, despite having to save fuel in the last 22 laps.

At the Australian Grand Prix, Massa was appointed a director of the Grand Prix Drivers' Association. Massa qualified fifth for the race, which was marked by changeable weather conditions and ten non-finishers. He finished third, largely managing to steer clear of the chaos. After the race, Massa commented cheerfully that it had been an unusually good start to the season for him. Third was his best ever finish at Melbourne. After a storming drive to seventh from 21st on the grid in Malaysia, he took the lead in the world championship. However, a disappointing ninth in China meant that he dropped back to sixth in the standings.

Massa qualified 9th in Spain, and finished the race 6th despite contact with Karun Chandhok which damaged his front wing. In Monaco, Massa was very quick during practice and qualified fourth. He got off to a great start and got alongside Robert Kubica, but had to yield the racing line at the first corner and finished the race in fourth, which promoted him to fifth in the championship with 61 points. The next race, the Turkish Grand Prix – at which Massa has historically excelled – ended for him in a disappointing seventh, although he at least managed to out-qualify teammate Alonso and beat him in the race. Massa described the race as "boring"; he spent it battling with the Renaults of Kubica and Vitaly Petrov for the minor points positions. In Canada he qualified seventh and after an excellent start he spun Liuzzi three times and from there on had a poor race finishing 15th and a lap down. In Valencia, he qualified fifth, but after Mark Webber and Heikki Kovalainen collided and the safety car came out, he finished 11th and out of the points. In Silverstone, Massa qualified seventh, but on the first lap he developed a puncture after contact in the new section of the circuit. He ended up in a disappointing fifteenth, as the last car on the lead lap.

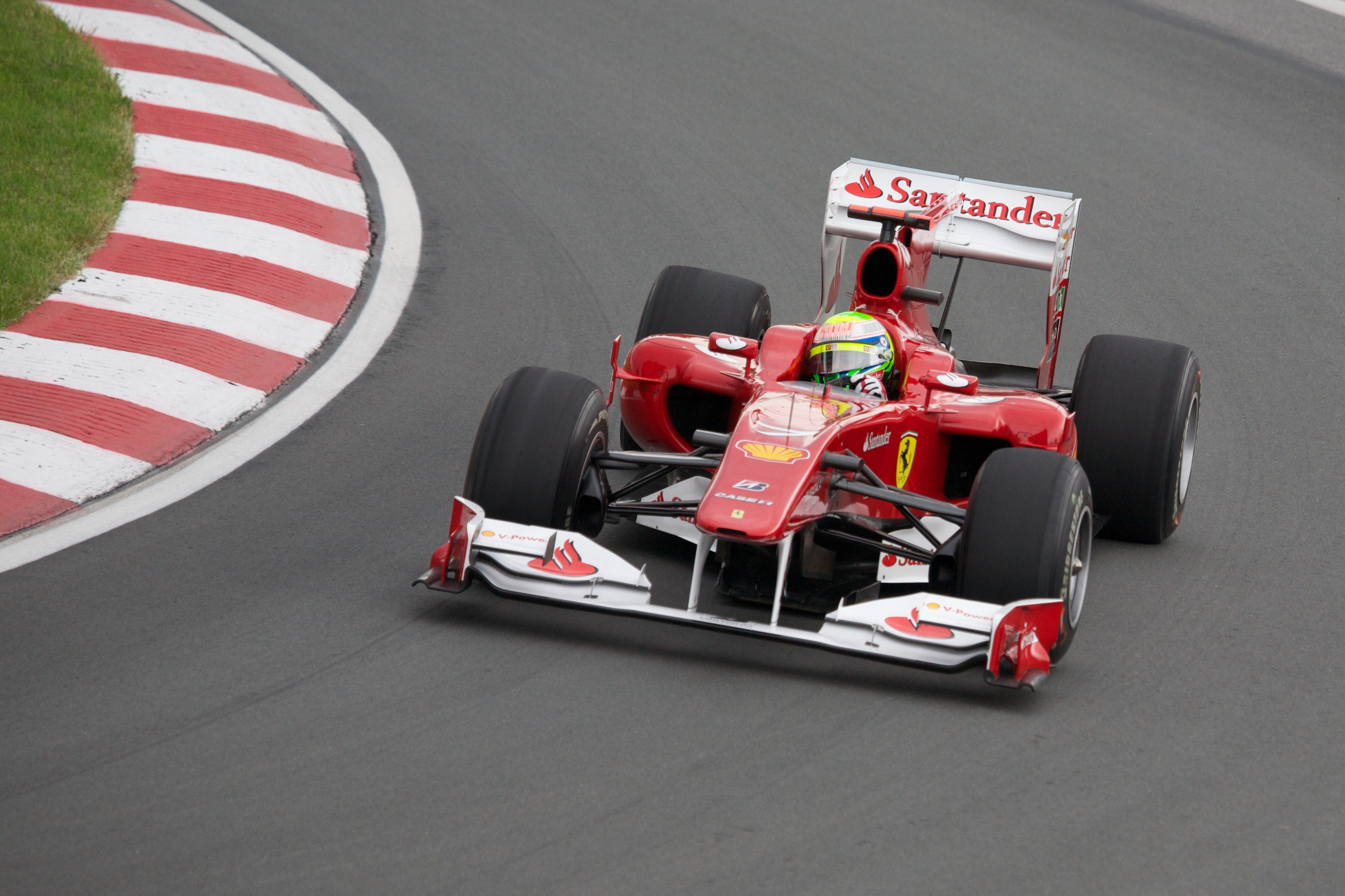
Massa at the 2010 Canadian Grand Prix

At the 2010 German Grand Prix Ferrari were investigated for team orders as Massa took the race lead early, ahead of Fernando Alonso in second and Sebastian Vettel close behind in third. During the race these positions were maintained until Massa received instructions from Ferrari engineer Rob Smedley, saying "Fernando is faster than you. Can you confirm you understood that message?". Shortly afterwards, on lap 49, Massa allowed Alonso to take the lead, and consequently to win the race. Smedley then added after the pass 'Ok mate good lad, stick with him now, sorry.' The incident strongly suggested that a team order had been made to Massa to let Alonso overtake, and race stewards agreed. Despite team boss Stefano Domenicali's denial, Ferrari were fined $100,000 for breaking Sporting Regulations and the matter was referred to the FIA World Motor Sport Council. Massa finished 4th in Hungary and Belgium and third in Italy. In Singapore, he qualified last due to a gearbox issue, but finished the race eighth. Massa collided with Vitantonio Liuzzi on the first lap of the Japanese Grand Prix but finished third in Korea. He finished a disappointing 15th in Brazil, and tenth in Abu Dhabi. Massa ended the season ranked sixth in the Drivers' Championship.

In June, Massa agreed to a contract extension until the end of the 2012 season.

==== 2011 ====
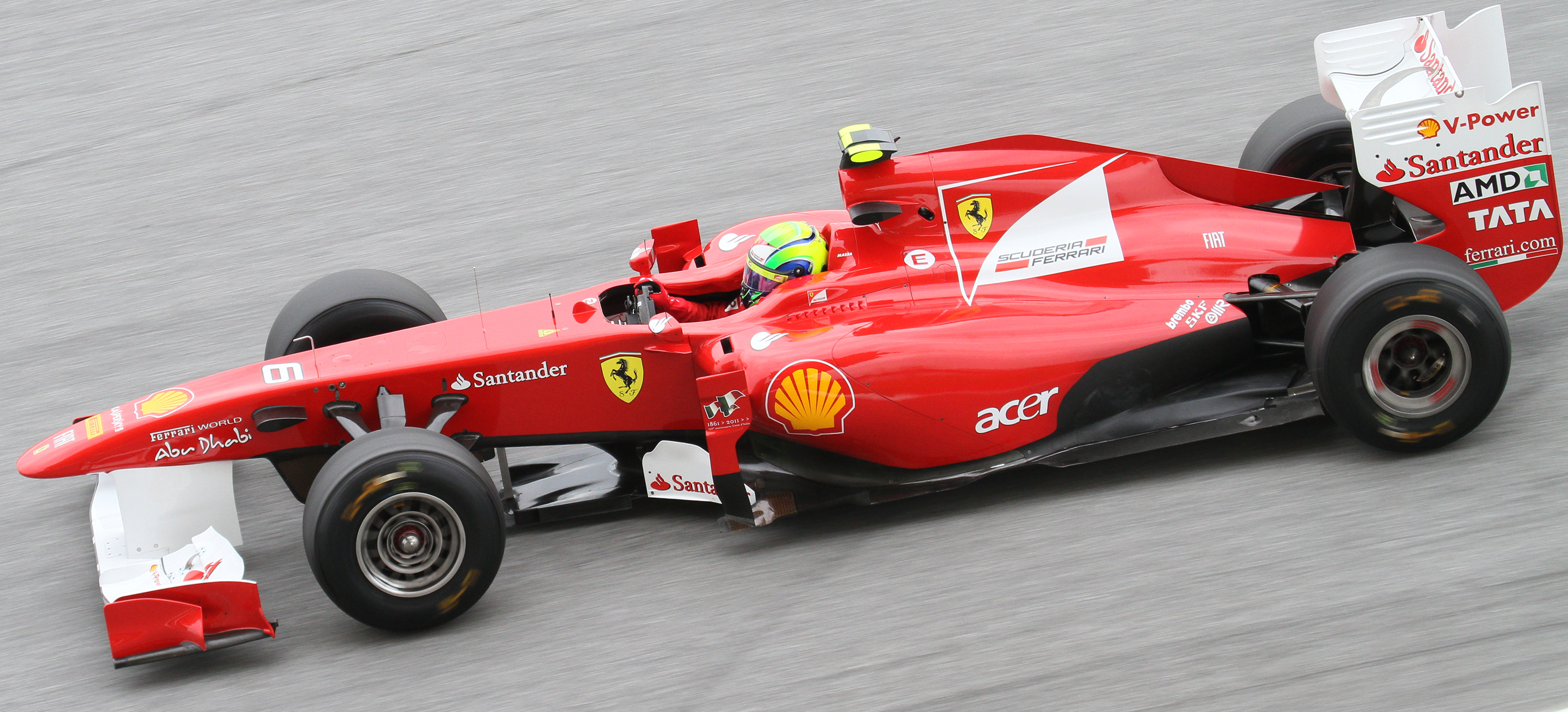
Massa at the 2011 Malaysian Grand Prix.

Massa remained with Scuderia Ferrari in 2011, and again was partnered with Fernando Alonso. He drove his new car – the Ferrari 150º Italia – for the first time on 29 January 2011, undertaking a shakedown of the car at the Fiorano Circuit.

At the Australian Grand Prix, Massa endured a poor start to the season at what has traditionally been his bogey race. Qualifying eighth, over 0.6 seconds behind teammate Alonso, Massa managed to get ahead of Alonso and several other drivers at the start and ran in fifth place for a while, much to the frustration of Jenson Button, who had a much quicker car but was unable to pass him. A lack of pace dropped Massa down the order to an eventual ninth-place finish, which became seventh after the Saubers of Kamui Kobayashi and Sergio Pérez were disqualified.

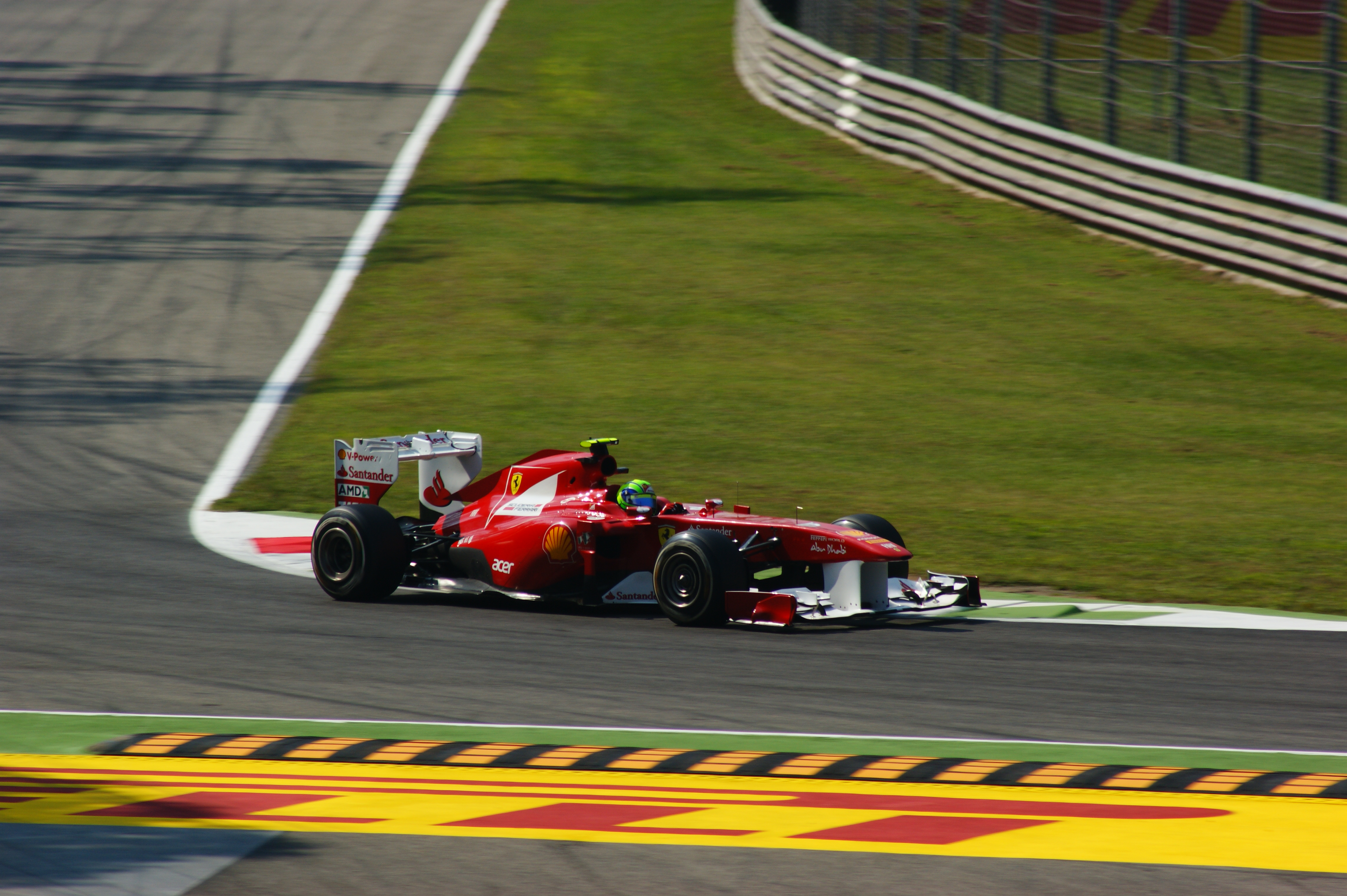
Massa driving at Ferrari's home race – the Italian Grand Prix.

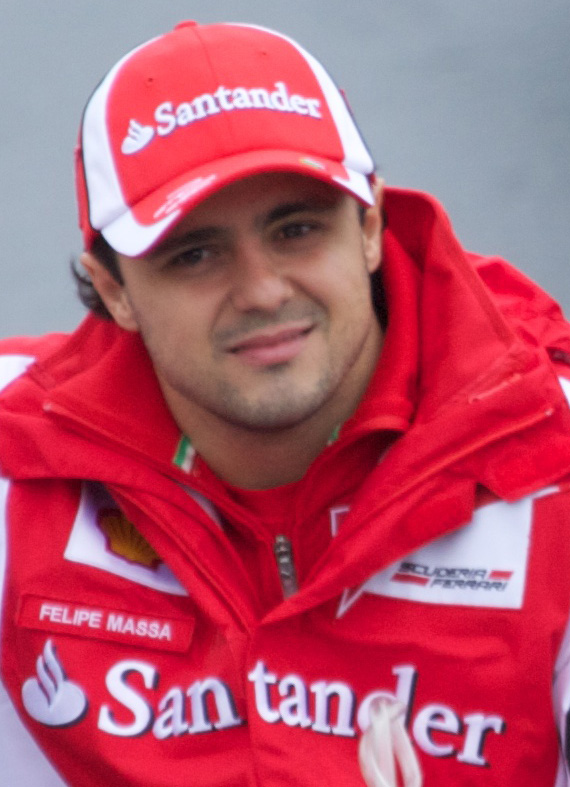
Felipe Massa - 2011 Canadian Grand Prix

The Malaysian Grand Prix saw a better performance from Massa, who qualified seventh and showed greatly improved race pace, particularly on the soft Pirelli tyres. Massa again made a fine start to the race and ran ahead of Alonso until his first pit-stop. A problem with a tyre-change cost him time but he finished ahead of Alonso in fifth, after Alonso damaged his front wing against Lewis Hamilton's right-rear tyre. In China, Massa improved again; at one point looking like challenging for the race win, before settling for sixth as Ferrari's two-stop strategy did not suit the conditions. Despite this, he finished over fifteen seconds ahead of Alonso, and was pleased with his improved race performance. He finished 11th in Turkey after a slow pit stop, and retired in Spain due to a gearbox fault. In Monaco, Massa made contact with Lewis Hamilton at the hairpin on lap 32, and crashed in the tunnel a few corners later. While at the Canadian Grand Prix, on the last lap, he overtook Kamui Kobayashi just before the chequered flag to finish in sixth place. Three fifth places followed in Valencia, Silverstone – after a late-race battle with Hamilton – and at the German Grand Prix where Red Bull's Sebastian Vettel had a faster pit stop when they both pitted together on the penultimate lap, losing Massa fourth place. Massa added a sixth-place finish in Hungary.

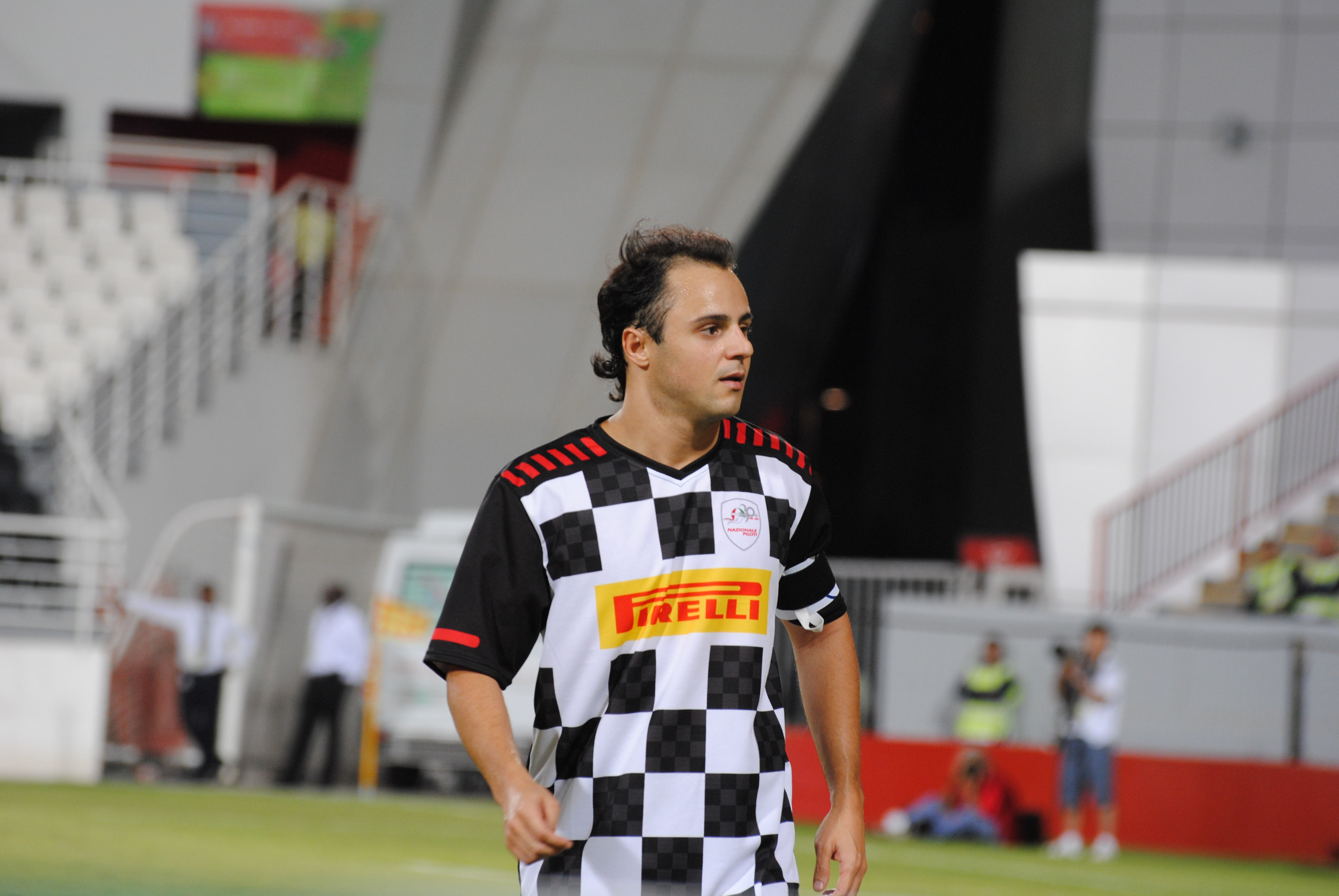
Massa during a charity football match in Abu Dhabi

Massa out-qualified Alonso for only the second time in 2011, in Belgium; but he fell from fourth to eighth in the race. Massa took another sixth-place finish at the Italian Grand Prix, after he was spun round by Webber on lap five. Hamilton made contact with Massa for the third time in 2011, when attempting to overtake him for eighth in the Singapore Grand Prix. Hamilton punctured Massa's right-rear tyre with his front wing, an incident for which Hamilton received a drive-through penalty. This followed an incident in qualifying where Hamilton lunged down Massa's inside, attempting to pass on an out-lap, which led Massa to publicly criticise Hamilton. Massa also went up to Hamilton in the post-race TV interview area as he was about to start an interview with RTL Television, patted his shoulder, and sarcastically said: "Good job, bro." It was later reported that during the race Massa's engineer Rob Smedley sent a radio message to Massa stating "Hold Hamilton as much as we can. Destroy his race as much as we can. Come on, boy..." Hamilton and Massa collided at the next race in Japan, damaging Massa's front wing endplate, but he eventually finished in seventh place. After the race, Massa called for the FIA to take action on Hamilton. After finishing sixth at the Korean Grand Prix, he crashed in qualifying for the Indian Grand Prix after he broke his suspension on a kerb and then hit the barriers. In the race, he once again collided with Hamilton on the 24th lap of the Indian Grand Prix, for the fifth time this season, this time however with Massa being awarded a drive-through penalty. He retired later after hitting a kerb too hard, the same fate which ended his qualifying session. He rounded off the year with two fifth-place finishes in Abu Dhabi and Brazil.

==== 2012 ====
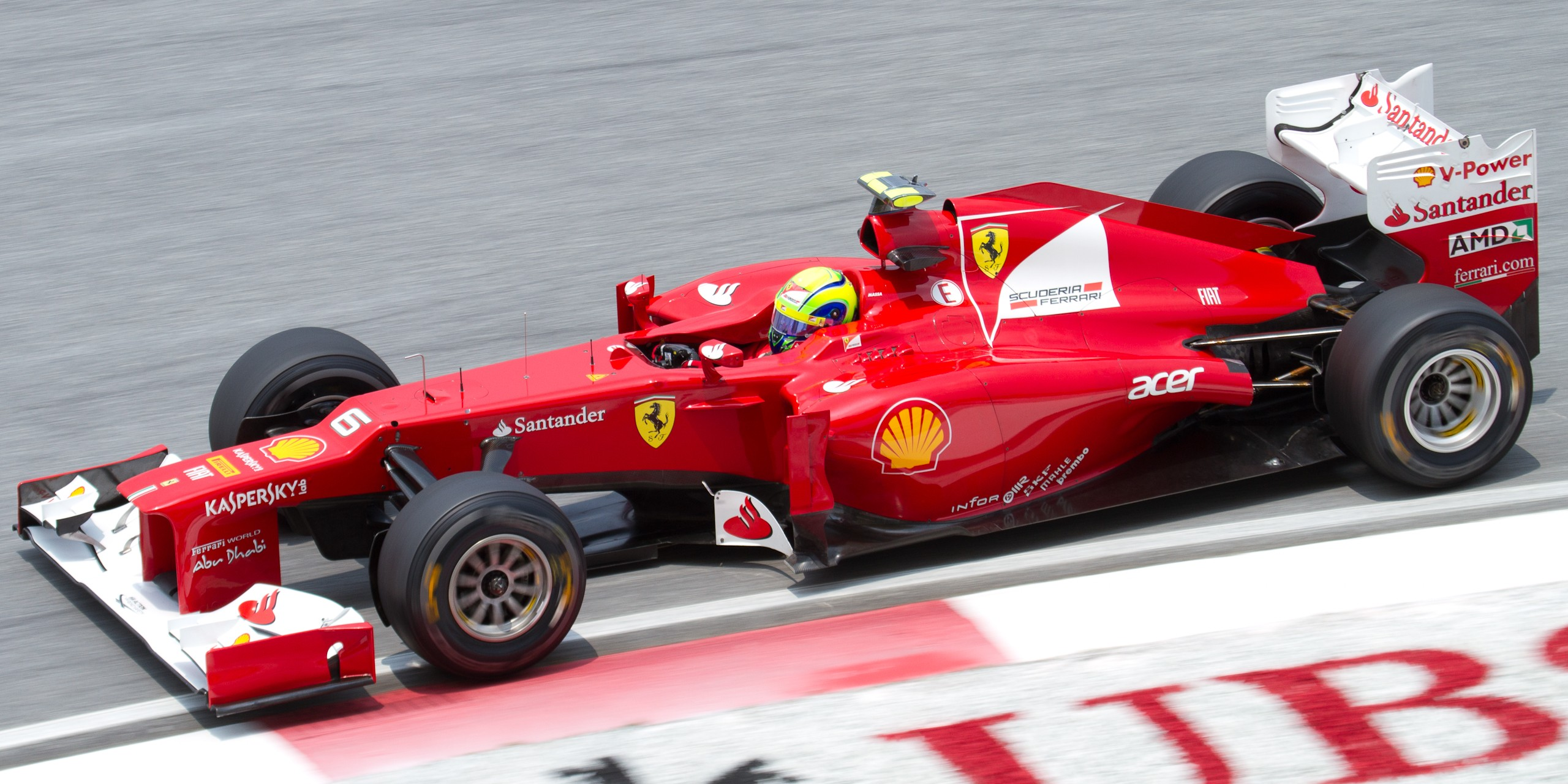
Massa driving for Ferrari at the 2012 Malaysian Grand Prix.

Despite his disappointing 2011, Massa remained with Ferrari for 2012. At the Australian Grand Prix, Massa qualified 16th – a second behind teammate Alonso, who qualified twelfth – for his worst qualifying result since the 2010 Singapore Grand Prix, and the first time he qualified outside the top ten since the 2010 Japanese Grand Prix. Massa gained six places on the first lap, running as high as eighth in the early stages of the race, but suffered badly from tyre degradation and fell down the order before retiring from the race after a collision with Williams driver Bruno Senna; both drivers later agreed that it was a racing incident. In the Malaysian Grand Prix, Massa qualified 12th and finished 15th, one minute and 37 seconds behind his teammate Fernando Alonso, who won the race. This result put Massa 19th in the Championship, whilst teammate Alonso was leading on 35 points. Sauber's Sergio Pérez finished 2nd and there has been speculation linking Pérez to Massa's seat. Massa was thirteenth at the Chinese Grand Prix before he scored his first points of the season with ninth at the Bahrain Grand Prix. In Spain, Massa started sixteenth and finished fifteenth whilst teammate Alonso started and finished second, he also had a drive-through for ignoring yellow flags. He finished sixth in Monaco, and tenth in Canada, after spinning in the early stages of the race.

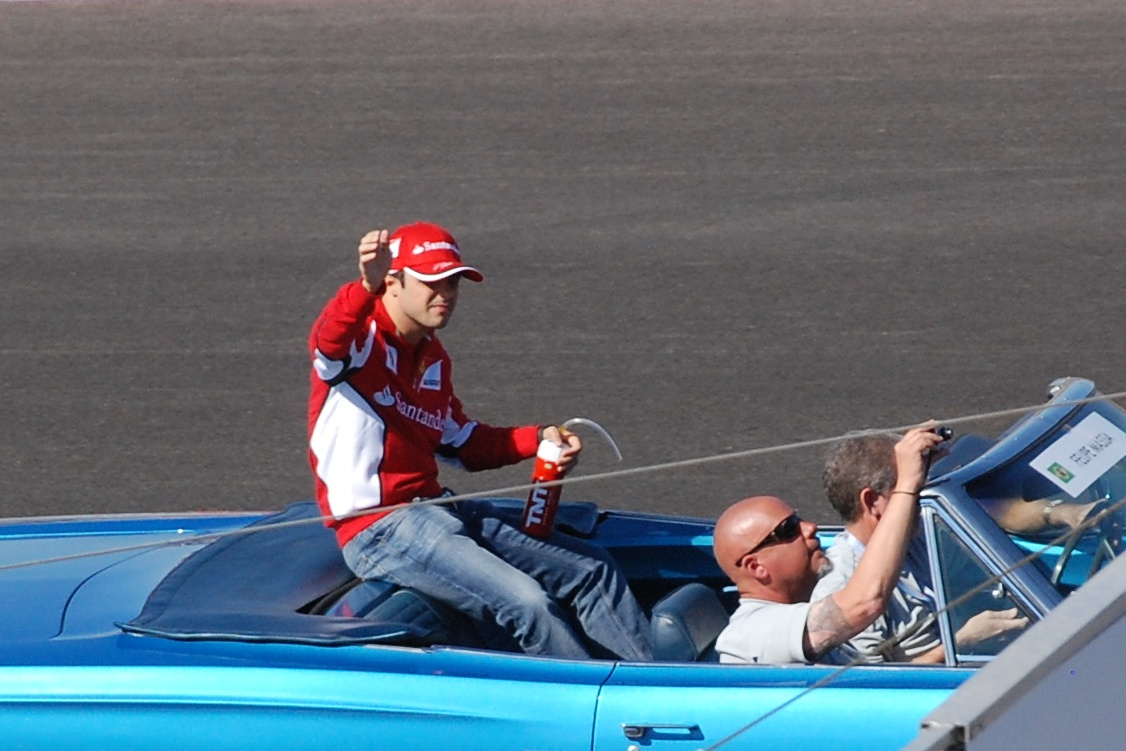
Massa at the 2012 US Grand Prix

He finished 16th in Valencia, after Kobayashi made contact with him at the restart. A great weekend followed in Silverstone, as he qualified 5th and finished 4th, despite Alonso's pole and second place. Massa finished 12th in Hockenheim, where he hit Daniel Ricciardo on the first lap and as a result, removed his own front wing. Massa added a ninth-place finish in Hungary. After qualifying 14th at Spa, Massa finished fifth in the race, earning ten points and climbing to eleventh position in the driver standings, with the same points as Michael Schumacher. Massa took his best qualifying result of the season so far and got third place grid position at Monza. After a great start, he made his way up to second position but finished the race in fourth after being passed by Alonso and Pérez in the closing laps. In Suzuka, Massa qualified 11th, but started tenth due to a gearbox penalty for Nico Hülkenberg. He made a great start after his teammate Alonso retired at the first corner of the first lap, and went on to finish in second position, his first podium since the 2010 Korean Grand Prix. Massa qualified sixth for the 2012 Korean Grand Prix. He maintained sixth position after the first corner, and overtook Räikkönen on the first lap. After a few laps he also made a move on Lewis Hamilton, giving him 4th position. He had great pace throughout, with the possibility to overtake Alonso and even Webber, but because Alonso is fighting for the Drivers' Championship, Massa was told to hold station. On 16 October 2012, Massa signed a one-year contract with Ferrari. This came as a result of an impressive string of results for the Scuderia, and means that Massa is under contract to race with Ferrari until the end of 2013. In India, Massa qualified sixth and finished sixth, despite having to save fuel and being hounded by Räikkönen the whole race. In Abu Dhabi, Massa qualified 9th but started on the grid in 8th as a result of Vettel's penalty. He ran as high as seventh until he spun when fighting with Mark Webber, but drove well and worked his way up to seventh again. At the US Grand Prix, Massa outqualified teammate Alonso for only the second time this year. But then Ferrari tactically broke his gearbox seal to move Alonso onto the clean side of the grid. This demoted Massa to 11th but he drove a storming race to finish fourth. At the final race of the season in Brazil, Massa again outqualified teammate Alonso for the second straight race to start fifth. At the start of the race Massa made his way up into second place, only to fall down to 11th after some bad strategical decisions with the ever-changing weather conditions at Interlagos. Then thanks to a safety car, the field bunched up and Massa made his way through the field into second but had to yield to title-chasing teammate Alonso. Eventually, Massa finished third on the podium in front of his home crowd to end a good second half of the season for him.

==== 2013: Final season at Ferrari ====
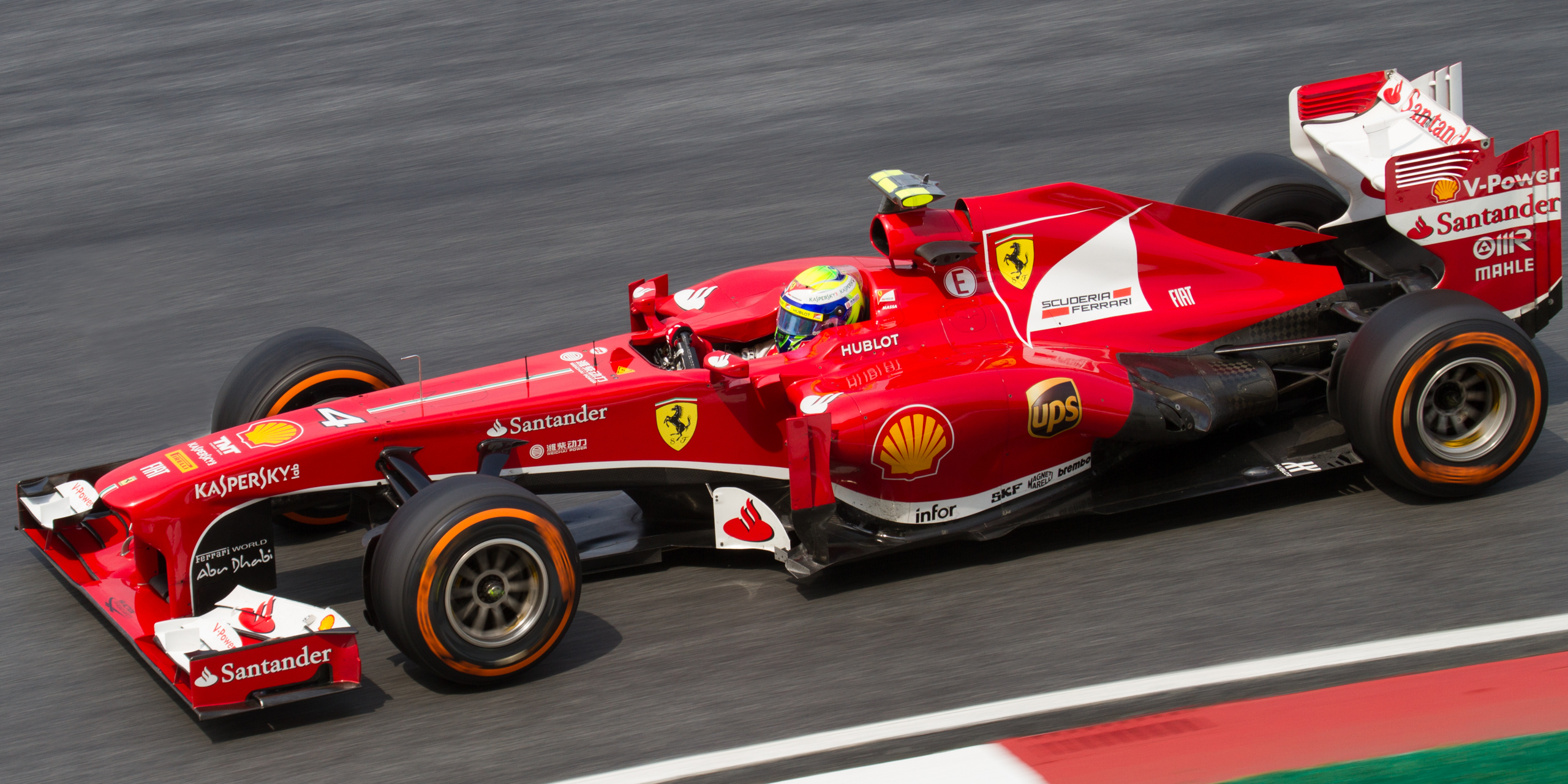
Massa at the 2013 Malaysian Grand Prix

Massa started his season strongly with the new F138 at the Australian Grand Prix. He qualified fourth, one place ahead of teammate Alonso. He was able to stay very competitive, especially during the early laps of the race but finished the race in fourth place, two places behind Alonso. At the following race in Malaysia, Massa started on the front row of the grid, out-qualifying Alonso for the fourth time in a row. Massa had a poor start and bad first stint on the intermediate tyres resulting him falling down the order, but as the track dried out, he recovered places on the slick tyres and finished fifth. Three weeks later at the Chinese Grand Prix Massa qualified fifth, beaten by his teammate, who qualified third, for the first time in five races. In the race, Massa got up to second place before the first round of pitstops, but he pitted a lap later than the other leaders, so he fell back down the order, so despite the early pace that he showed, only managed to finish sixth. At the next race in Bahrain, Massa qualified sixth but moved up to fourth alongside his teammate due to penalties for Webber and Hamilton. Massa was the only car in Q3 to qualify on the hard tyres indicating he was on a different strategy. In the race, the strategy gamble did not pay off as he did not run as far as he wanted and needed before the first stop. Along with two punctures in the race, this resulted in Massa finishing 15th. In Spain, Massa received a three-place grid penalty for blocking Mark Webber in qualifying, and started 9th. He made an excellent start, coming up to sixth, and then leapfrogged more cars during the pitstops, eventually finishing third. His first podium of the year situated him fifth in the Drivers' Championship.

In Monaco Massa suffered a heavy crash during third practice on Saturday into St Devote corner. He was driving down the main straight at almost 180 mph when his brakes locked and he slid into the barrier on the left hand side of the track. He lost control of the car and bounced off the wall ending up with a face on crash into the tyre wall ahead. He was unhurt by the accident but the car was badly damaged and Massa was unable to take part in Qualifying later in the day. Ferrari engineers initially believed the crash to be attributable to driver error. Starting the race from 21st on the grid, Massa slowly made up ground before crashing again into St Devote in an almost identical accident. After the crash Massa was taken to hospital in Monte Carlo but escaped with only minor injuries. This second incident caused Ferrari to investigate further, concluding that suspension failure, not driver error, was ultimately to blame. Massa scored an eighth place in Canada, and a sixth place in Britain. In Germany, he had a good start, jumping to sixth place, before spinning out on lap 3 with gearbox failure. In the Hungarian race, he struggled with an uncompetitive Ferrari, qualifying seventh and finishing eighth.

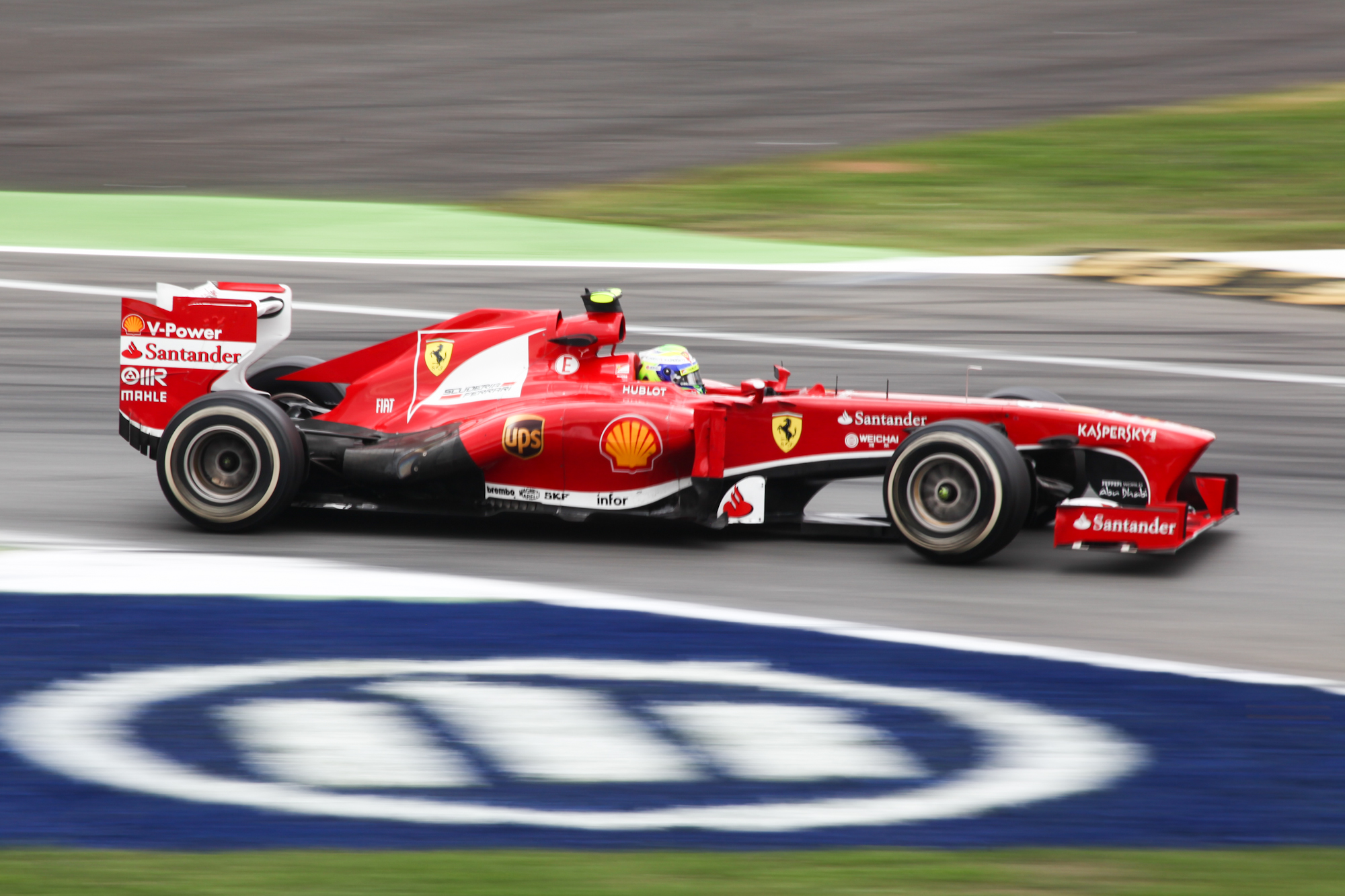
Massa at the 2013 Italian Grand Prix

In Belgium Massa looked to be heading for his first pole position since the 2008 Brazilian Grand Prix when he set the fastest time in wet conditions at the beginning of Q3 but the track dried and Ferrari had decided to leave Massa in the garage as they thought his time was good enough for pole so he dropped back to tenth, one place behind teammate Alonso. In the race, Massa finished seventh behind Alonso who finished second. In Ferrari's home race in Italy, Massa qualified fourth, one place ahead of his teammate. He then jumped Red Bull's Mark Webber and Sauber's Nico Hülkenberg, who qualified in a brilliant third when the best he had managed all season was tenth in a slow car. Hülkenberg was one of the drivers who was in a chance of taking Massa's seat in 2014. Despite Massa's great start, he moved over for Alonso who was race leader Sebastian Vettel's closest championship rival. Massa dropped to fourth in the pit stop phase after staying out longer than Alonso and Webber, but he fought back to challenge them for a podium, ultimately finishing in fourth place.

On 10 September 2013, Massa confirmed that he would be leaving Ferrari at the end of the season on Instagram and Twitter. The following day, it was announced that Massa's former teammate, Kimi Räikkönen, would be his replacement at Ferrari.

=== Williams (2014–2017) ===
==== 2014: Final pole position ====
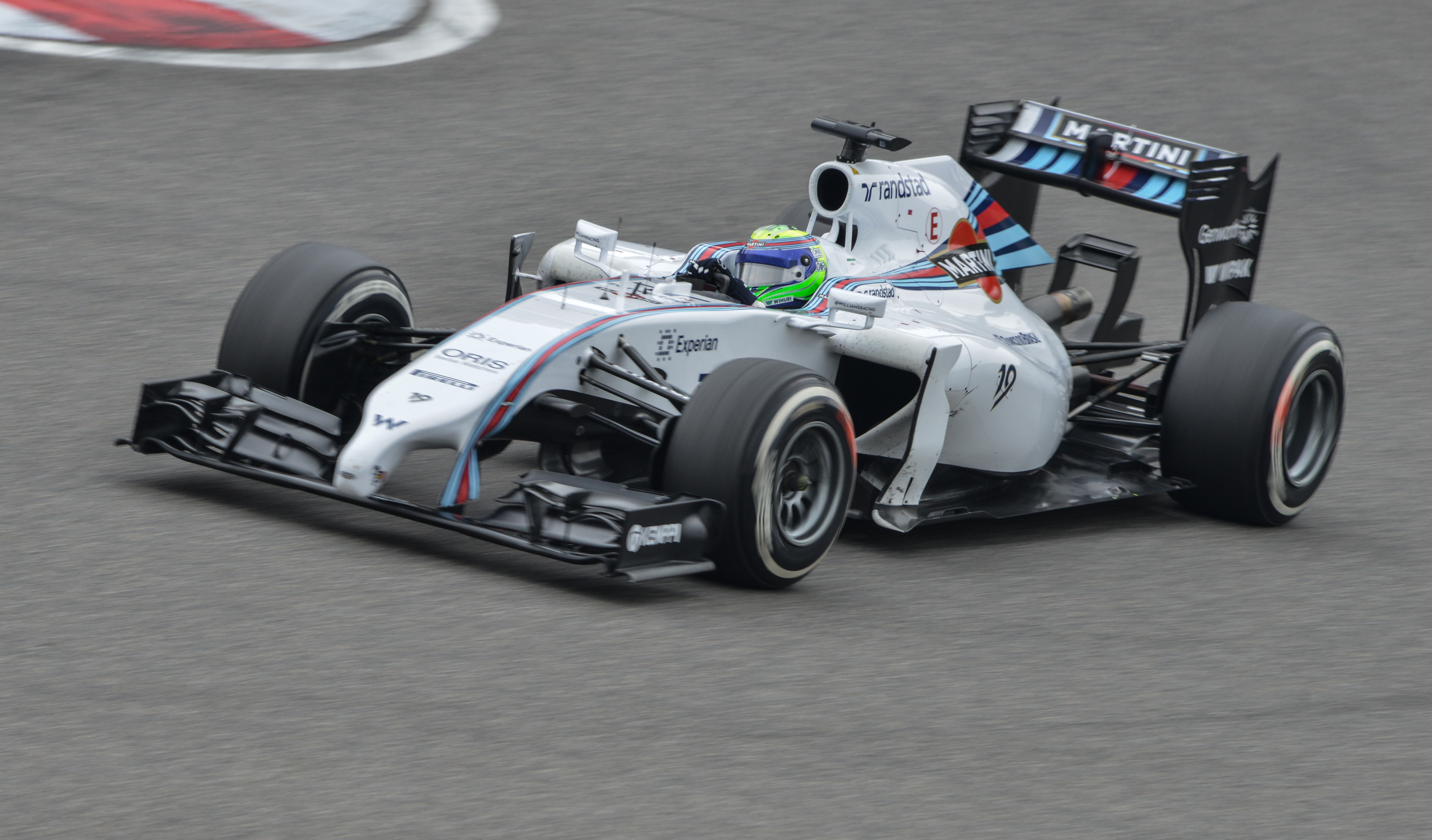
Massa at the 2014 Chinese Grand Prix.

On 11 November 2013, Williams announced that Massa would partner Valtteri Bottas for the 2014 season replacing Pastor Maldonado.

Massa suffered an unlucky start to his campaign in Australia, when he retired after being hit hard by Kamui Kobayashi's Caterham. The string of bad luck continued in Malaysia after a team orders debacle, being caught out by the safety car in Bahrain, a botched pitstop in China and a collision with Sergio Pérez in Canada. However, at the Austrian Grand Prix, he took his first pole position since the 2008 Brazilian Grand Prix and finished fourth. But the next two races, in Britain and Germany, resulted in first lap race-ending collisions with former Ferrari teammate Räikkönen and Kevin Magnussen respectively.

On 7 September 2014, it was confirmed that Massa, along with Bottas, would stay at Williams for 2015. On the same day, he scored his first podium for Williams, finishing third in the Italian Grand Prix.

On 9 November 2014, Massa took his second podium for Williams at the Brazilian Grand Prix as he finished third behind second placed Lewis Hamilton and winner Nico Rosberg. Massa ended Williams's competitive season on a high with what he described as his "best race of the year" at the Yas Marina Circuit in Abu Dhabi. Although qualifying in fourth – one place behind teammate Bottas – he showed good pace in the whole weekend and finished a strong second after Rosberg's subsequent power-unit problems, even making a late but convincing challenge on race leader Hamilton in the final third of the race.

==== 2015: Final podium ====
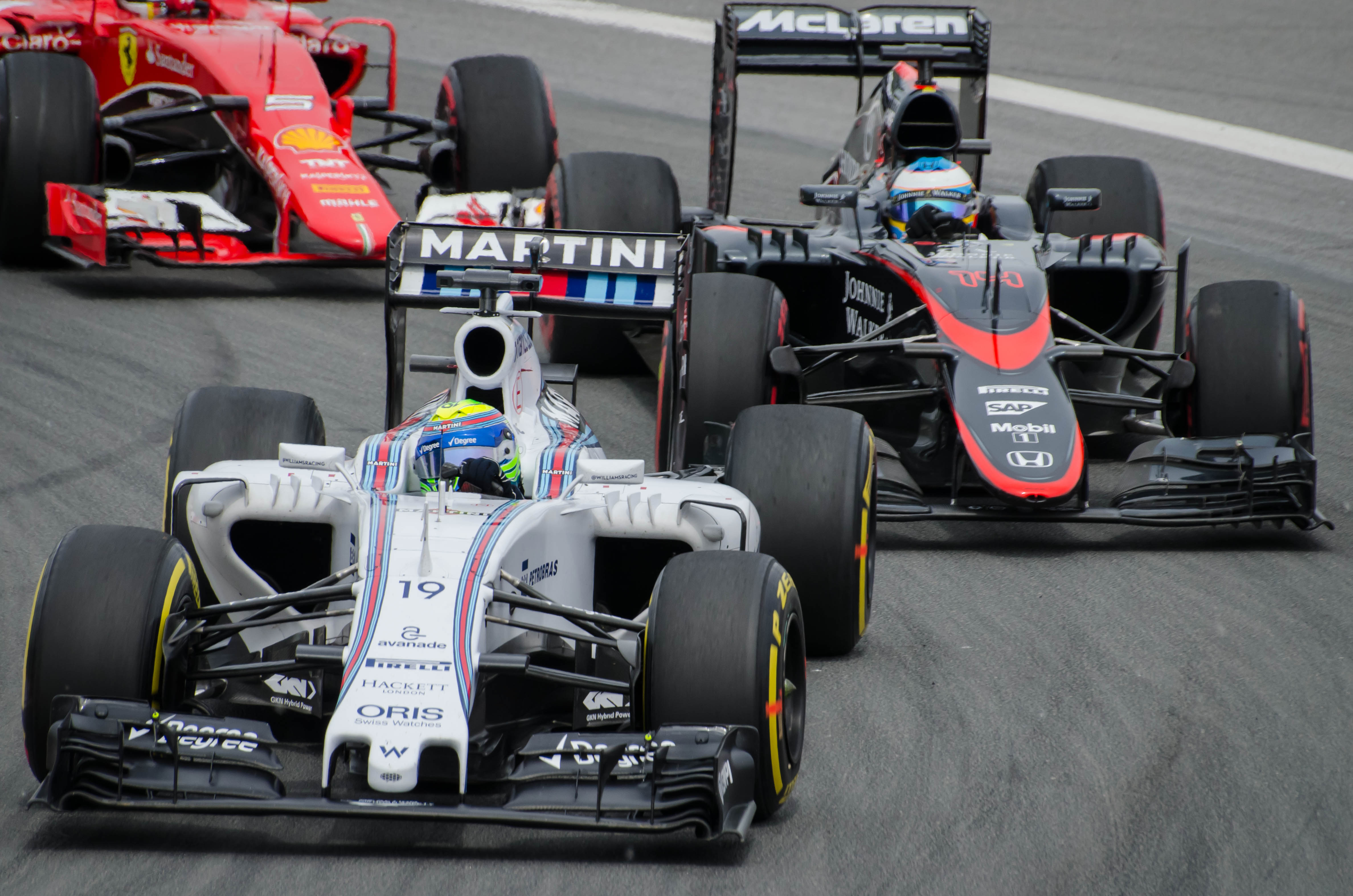
Massa leading Fernando Alonso at the 2015 Canadian Grand Prix

Massa's 2015 season started strongly, with a fourth-place finish in Australia. After some further strong results in Malaysia and China, Massa had troubles in the next stage of the season. He suffered from mechanical issues both on the grid in Bahrain and in qualifying in Canada, meaning he had to fight from towards the back on each occasion, albeit eventually finishing both races in the points.

In Austria, Massa took his first podium of the year, a third-place finish, taking advantage of a delayed pitstop for Vettel. It was the fortieth podium of his career. Massa qualified third for the British Grand Prix but started well and jumped to first leading the early stages of the race. However, he could only finish fourth after being jumped by both Lewis Hamilton and Sebastian Vettel during the pit stops.

In Hungary, the race did not start well for Massa, as he was handed a five-second stop and go penalty for being outside of the lines on the grid. In the end, Massa finished only twelfth, with his teammate right behind him. After a long summer break, the action returned to Belgium, where Williams seemed to be really quick. In qualifying, Massa achieved sixth position, which he maintained for the race, after some tyre issues in the first stint.

In the next round at Monza, Massa qualified fifth, but he made a good start to take third until the first round of pit stops, when he lost a place to the Mercedes of Nico Rosberg. After Rosberg's retirement on lap 51, Massa fought really hard to maintain the last podium spot, which he achieved. It was his second podium of the year, but it was a very emotional podium, in front of the tifosi.

In Singapore, Massa was running in eighth position until the first round of pitstops. On lap 13 and after a slow pitstop, Massa exited the pit lane and collided with Force India's driver Nico Hülkenberg. The incident was examined by the stewards. They eventually handed Hülkenberg a drop of three places for the next race. Massa suffered from gearbox problems and retired on lap 30.

The next race, in Japan, started well for Massa after qualifying a solid fifth in between the Ferrari pair. The race however was basically over before it even began as Massa collided with Daniel Ricciardo and caused a first corner puncture for both drivers, with Massa finishing 17th and two laps down, with the race resulting in Massa dropping ground in the championship fight for fourth place between himself, Bottas and Räikkönen.

The Russian Grand Prix, was a contrast in fortune for Massa. After a poor qualifying due to traffic he was only able to start 15th on the grid, due to failures from other cars and a last lap collision between his teammate Bottas and Räikkönen in a battle for the final podium position, Massa was able to cross the finish line a solid fourth place just behind the Force India of Sergio Pérez in 3rd.

In the following race, in Austin, torrential rain hit the race weekend and Massa qualified ninth. At the start, he spun and collided with his former teammate Fernando Alonso, before retiring due to a gearbox damper failure. The next race saw the return of the Mexican Grand Prix to the calendar after 23 years. Massa qualified seventh and in the race he finished sixth.

In his home event, in Brazil, Massa struggled the whole weekend with his car balance. Despite his setup problems, he qualified and finished the race in eighth position, before being disqualified from the race results as the stewards found that his right-rear tyre did not comply with the maximum permitted temperature ahead of the start of the race. In the last round of the season, in Abu Dhabi, Massa qualified in eighth. After a late overtake on Red Bull Racing driver Daniil Kvyat he finished his 2015 campaign in eighth position. He finished the season in sixth place in the drivers' standings, achieving two podiums in Austria and in Italy.

==== 2016 ====
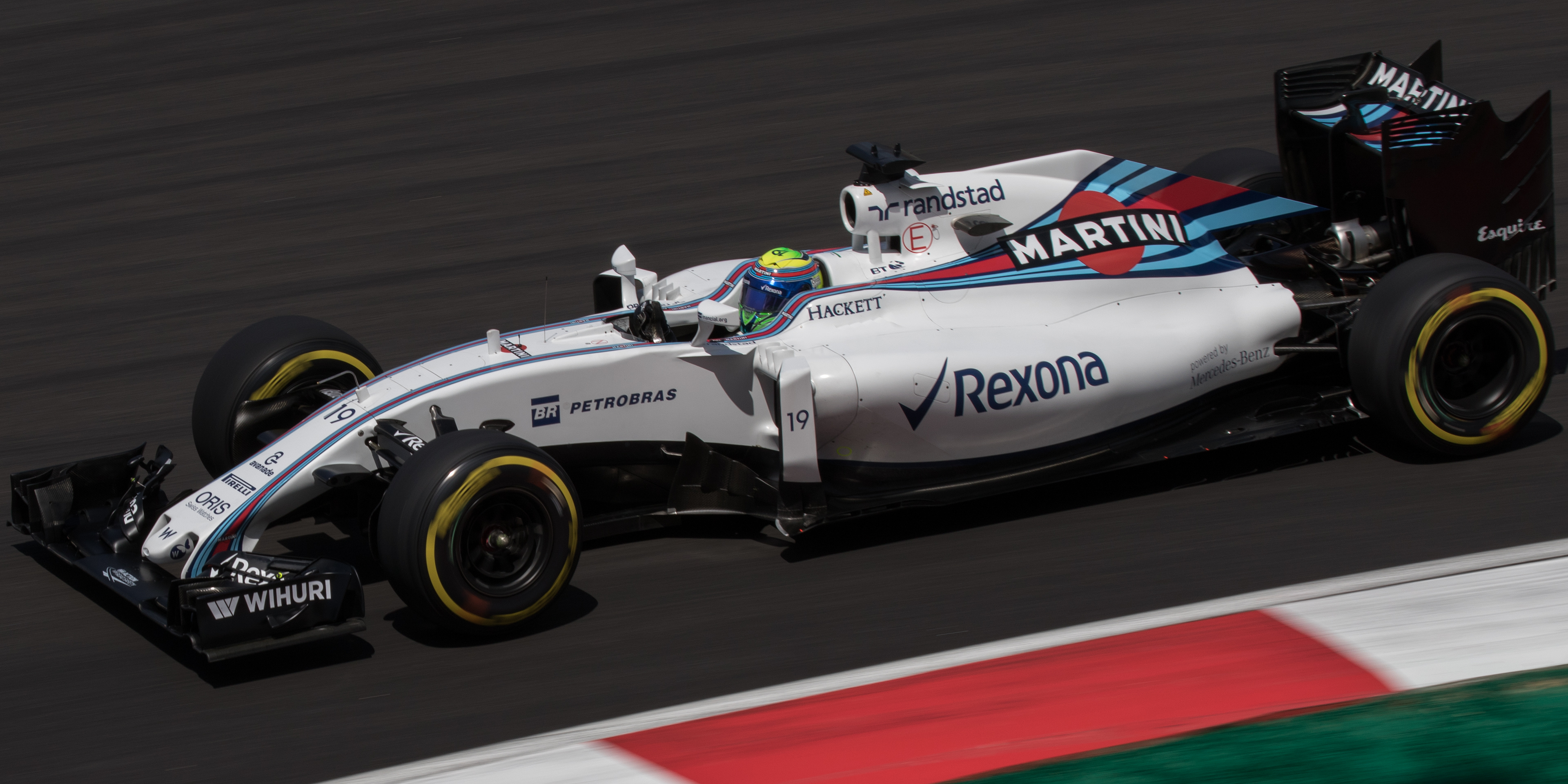
Massa driving for Williams at the 2016 Malaysian Grand Prix

The 2016 season started well for Massa; after qualifying in a solid sixth place for the first race of the season in Australia, he drove a lonely race to finish fifth, collecting 10 points. In the second round of the season, in Bahrain, Massa qualified in seventh, 0.002 seconds behind his teammate. After an excellent start, Massa climbed up to second until the first round of pit stops, which saw Williams followed a conservative two-stop strategy, using the medium compound. The strategy did not work out, and Massa finished the race in eighth, after being overtaken on the last lap by Red Bull Racing driver Daniil Kvyat.

The next round, the 2016 Chinese Grand Prix, saw Massa qualifying a disappointing eleventh, after a red flag prevented Massa from having a final run in Q2. In the race, Massa followed a two stop strategy, which helped him finish in a solid sixth place, after a long fight with Lewis Hamilton. Round 4, the Russian Grand Prix, saw Massa qualifying in fifth place, but he was promoted to fourth after Scuderia Ferrari driver Sebastian Vettel was given a five-place grid penalty after changing his gearbox. In the race, Massa stayed out of trouble on the first lap, and drove a quiet race to finish a solid fifth.

At round 5 of the season, the Spanish Grand Prix, Massa was knocked out in Q1, after losing time with traffic during his first run, and then failing to have enough time to go out again for a second run. It was the first time since Russia in 2014 that Massa was knocked out in Q1. In the race, Massa made solid progress, to finish in eighth after utilising an aggressive three stop strategy. The sixth event of the 2016 championship, the Monaco Grand Prix, did not start well for Massa as he crashed at Saint Devote in first practice. On Saturday, he qualified in 14th, but in a race that begun in wet conditions, Massa progressed to finish tenth and score one point, becoming the only driver at that point in the season to have scored points in every race.

At the next race, the Canadian Grand Prix, the race weekend did not start well for Massa, as he crashed in the first practice session, in turn 1. The DRS did not close under braking, leaving Massa with a lack of rear downforce under braking, which led to the crash. Massa had to run the remainder of the weekend missing some parts after the crash in free practice one. He qualified on the fourth row, in eighth place. In the race, Massa had to retire due to a water leak which resulted in an overheated engine. One week later, at the European Grand Prix, the first Formula One race to be held in Azerbaijan, Massa struggled during the practice sessions, but managed to qualify sixth. In the race, he suffered from rear tyre graining and finished in tenth place.

In the following 4 races, Massa failed to score any points, as most of his races were compromised by bad luck. In Austria, Massa had to start from the pitlane due to a front wing change following structural damage sustained in qualifying. In the race, and despite his pitlane start, Massa had climbed into the points before he was forced to retire with high brake temperatures on lap 63. At the next race, the British Grand Prix, Massa started outside the top 10. His race was compromised even before the start, as torrential rain hit the circuit. The Williams car historically did not suit the wet weather conditions, and despite his infallible drive in those treacherous mixed conditions, Massa finished in eleventh, just outside the points. In the following race, in Hungary, Massa struggled throughout the race weekend. In the wet weather qualifying, Massa qualified a disappointing eighteenth. As the track began to dry, Massa switched to the intermediates, but aquaplaned at Turn 4 and made heavy contact with the barrier, which brought his session to an end. In the race, Massa finished in eighteenth. Massa encountered steering rack issues on the way to the grid, with the steering wheel rack being too light on one side and too heavy on the other. The Williams crew worked hard to try and fix it before the start of the race. The issue was improved to a degree that Massa was able to race the car, but he was extremely compromised.

The last race before the summer break was held in Germany. Massa qualified in tenth. His race though, was compromised when he was clipped on the opening lap by Palmer's Renault which affected his car's pace. The issue could not be identified or resolved during the race, therefore he was forced to retire on lap 36. Next, in Belgium, Massa qualified in tenth, as he could do only one run in Q3. In his only effort, Massa locked up his tyres heading to turn 1 and his lap was compromised. At the start of the race, he managed to stay out of trouble and climbed up to fourth, but he could not keep the tyres in good shape and finished in tenth.

On 1 September 2016, Massa announced that he would retire from Formula One at the end of the season.

After announcing his retirement from Formula 1 after 15 years, Massa qualified eleventh for the Italian Grand Prix. After an aggressive start, which saw him overtake 3 cars, Massa finished his last Italian race in ninth. After a two-week break, the action returned to Singapore. In qualifying, Massa was caught by yellow flags, caused by Romain Grosjean and Jenson Button. He finished in 12th, but he was promoted to 11th after Sergio Pérez was penalised for improving his time in Q2 under yellow flag conditions. In the race, Massa followed an unsuccessful three-stop strategy, and despite running in the top-ten for the majority of the race, he finished in twelfth.

At the Malaysian Grand Prix, his whole race was compromised by extremely bad luck. Massa suffered a throttle issue, leaving him stranded on the grid as the formation lap started. The team were able to get the car going to enable him to start from the pitlane. However, just a couple of laps later he picked up a slow puncture and had to pit again. Massa was then down in 19th but drove a strong race to fight back to 13th at the finish. Next, in Japan, Williams decided to do a single effort in Q2, which saw Massa qualifying in twelfth. In the race, Massa lost 2 places at the start, from the Toro Rosso drivers, as he started on the medium tyres. After following a one stop strategy, Massa finished in ninth, just in front of his teammate. At the following race, in Austin, Massa qualified in ninth. In the race, Massa had an excellent start, gaining two positions at the first corner and running in sixth place. However, a virtual safety car was deployed due to Max Verstappen's retirement allowing Carlos Sainz Jr an advantage to move ahead into fifth place. In the final stint, in a battle for fifth, Massa and Fernando Alonso came together to Massa's detriment, dropping him to seventh and causing a puncture which resulted in a pitstop on the penultimate lap. The incident was investigated by the stewards, but no action was taken. Massa was able to maintain track position and finish the race in seventh, ahead of Sergio Pérez. This was the best result for Massa since the Russian Grand Prix.

In the next race, in Mexico, Massa qualified ninth. In the race, Massa made a strong start, going from ninth to sixth in the opening laps, and pitted for the medium tyre on lap 14. He ran in ninth for the majority of the race on the medium tyre, holding off a chasing Pérez who had newer medium tyres and DRS for much of the race.

In Brazil, Massa qualified thirteenth, as the cold conditions did not help him. In the wet race, Massa was making good progress in the treacherous conditions until he crashed out of what was expected to be at the time his last home Grand Prix on lap 47, prompting emotional scenes as he was cheered by fans whilst being given a guard of honour by other teams as he walked back down the pitlane.

==== 2017: Final F1 season ====
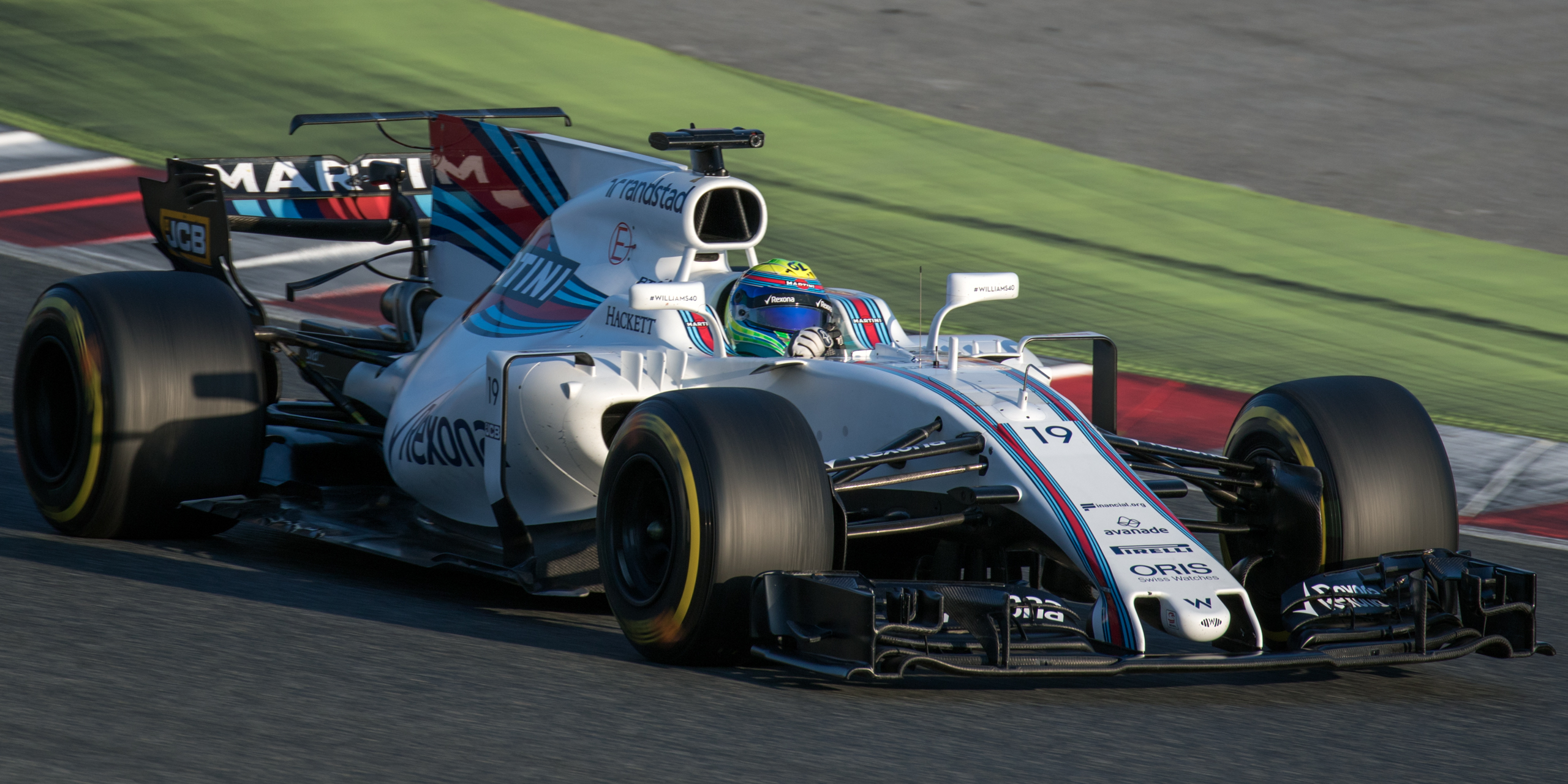
Massa during pre-season testing for Williams in 2017

On 16 January 2017, Massa rejoined Williams after Valtteri Bottas signed with Mercedes. In the first race of the season, the Australian Grand Prix, Massa qualified in seventh and finished in sixth. In China, he qualified in sixth. In the race, he struggled with the changing conditions to finish in 14th. Next, in Bahrain, Massa qualified in eighth and finished a strong sixth. In Russia, he qualified in sixth. In the race, he suffered two punctures and finished in ninth. Moving on to Spain, Massa qualified in ninth. In the race, he made a good start but made contact with McLaren driver Fernando Alonso and suffered a puncture. As a result, he finished out of the points, in 13th. In Monaco, Massa qualified only in 15th, as he was caught by yellow flags caused by Stoffel Vandoorne. In the race, he kept out of trouble to finish in ninth, collecting two points. In Montreal, Massa qualified a solid seventh. His race was short lived, as he was taken out by a spinning Carlos Sainz Jr. at turn 3. Two weeks later in Azerbaijan, Massa qualified in ninth behind his teammate Lance Stroll for the first time that season and ahead of the eventual race winner Daniel Ricciardo. In the race, Massa had a good start, avoiding the turn 2 collision between Kimi Räikkönen and Valtteri Bottas, climbing up to sixth. Massa showed good pace throughout the race and managed to climb up to third passing both Kimi Räikkönen and Sergio Pérez during the safety car restarts and almost pulled off a sublime move on Sebastian Vettel for second place, before the race was red-flagged due to large amounts of debris around the track. When the race restarted, Massa suffered from a broken rear damper and had to retire from the race on lap 25, a race both Williams Chief Technical Officer Paddy Lowe and Massa himself believed he could have won.

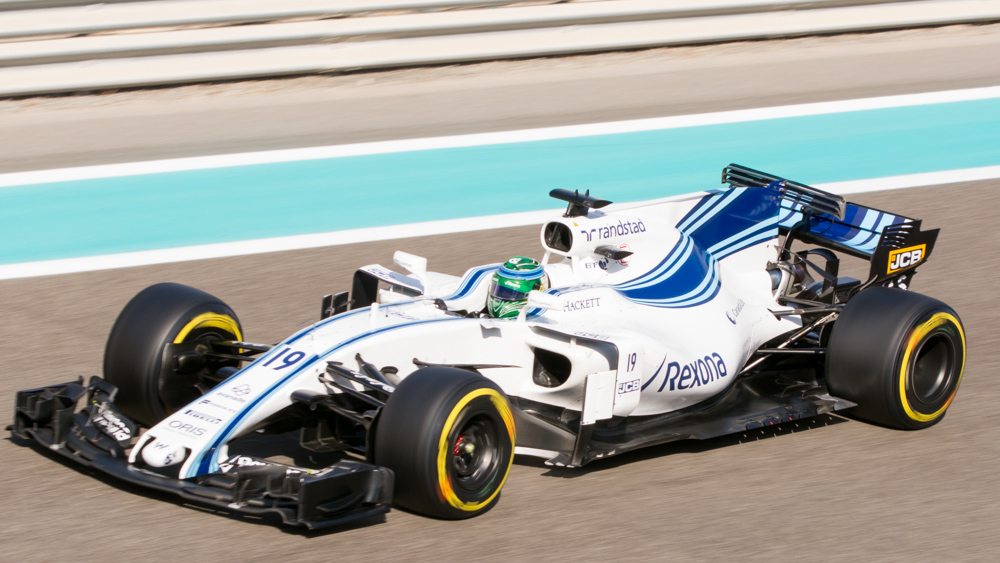
Felipe Massa at his final F1 weekend at Yas Marina Circuit

Massa recovered well at the next two races in Austria and Britain to finish both races in the points with a ninth and tenth-place finish respectively.

After missing the Hungarian Grand Prix due to illness, Massa returned for the Belgian Grand Prix to claim eighth place, a result he then repeated in Italy one week later. Poor strategy calls in Singapore left Massa languishing in 11th place by the finish. Points were to come at the next three races for Massa as he finished ninth in Malaysia, tenth in Japan and ninth in the United States Grand Prix.

On 4 November, Massa announced for the second time that he would retire from Formula One, at the end of the 2017 season.

At the Brazilian Grand Prix, his home race, Massa finished a strong seventh after overtaking Fernando Alonso on the fifth lap for fifth place but lost out to Daniel Ricciardo and Lewis Hamilton.

2017 was a difficult year for Williams as a whole due to a lack of downforce (affecting tyre wear to an extent) from the car in addition to poor wet weather drivability as shown in races such as China, where Massa started sixth but finished outside of the points. Williams began with a superior car to the midfield teams such as Force India but fell behind in the development race midseason.

== Formula E ==
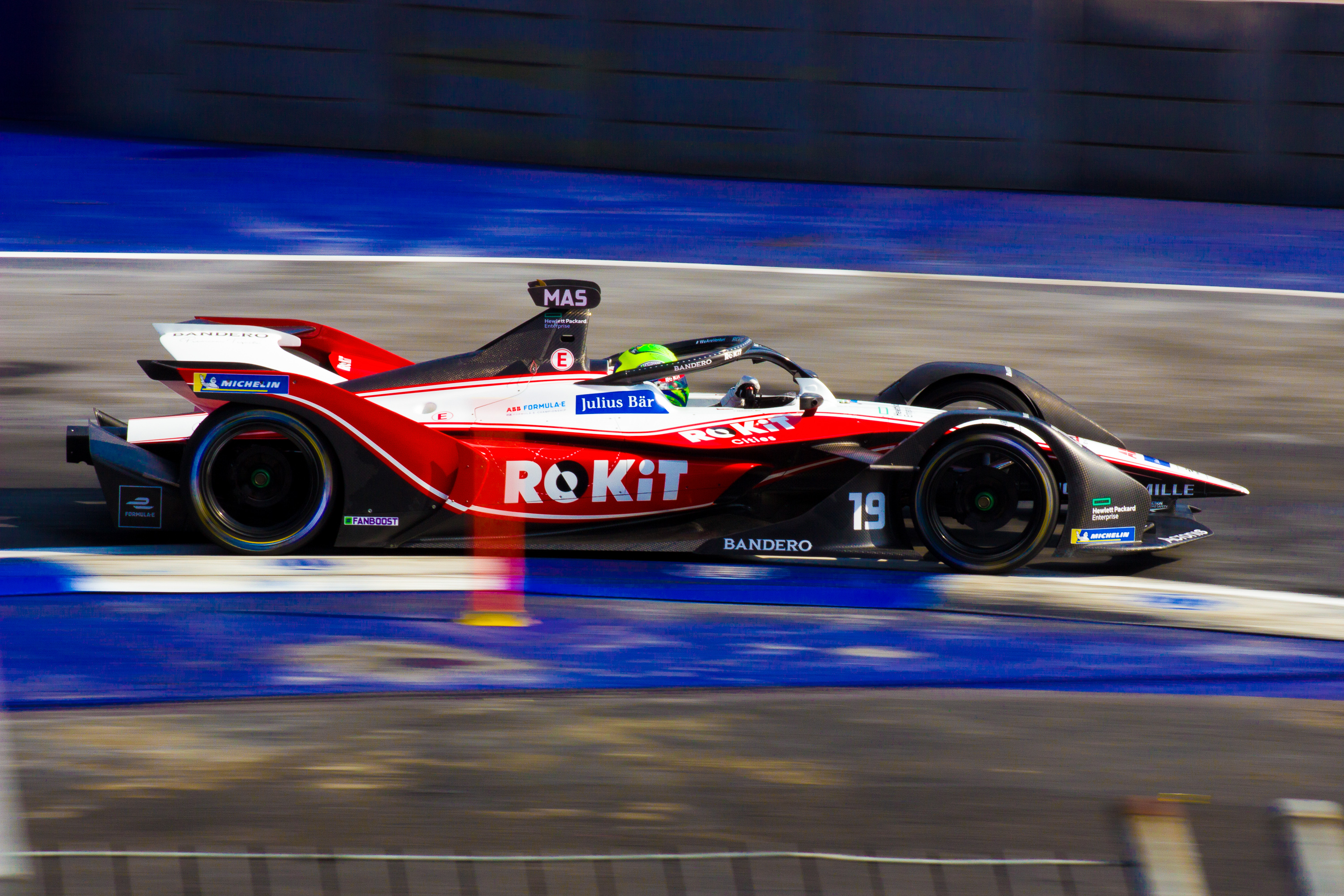
Massa driving for Venturi at the 2020 Mexico City ePrix.

In April 2018, it was announced that Massa would be taking part in Formula E racing for Venturi Grand Prix for three years starting with the 2018–19 Formula E season. On the final day of the 2019–20 season, Massa opted not to exercise the option in his contract to stay with Venturi for the 2020–21 Formula E season and left Formula E altogether.

== Porsche GT3 Cup Brasil ==
One month after his retirement from Formula E, Massa participated in the Porsche GT3 Cup Brasil endurance series, sharing a car with 2016 champion Lico Kaesemodel, and finishing in third.

== Stock Car Pro Series ==
After ending his full time participation in Formula E, Massa returned to his homeland Brazil, where he competed full time in Stock Car Pro Series with the Lubrax Podium team. After some struggles in the first 2 seasons, Massa's performances started to improve drastically during the 2023 Stock Car Pro Series. After a couple of podiums in Interlagos and Autódromo Velo Città, Massa got his first race win since the 2008 Formula One World Championship season finale, at Autódromo Internacional de Cascavel.

== Personal life ==
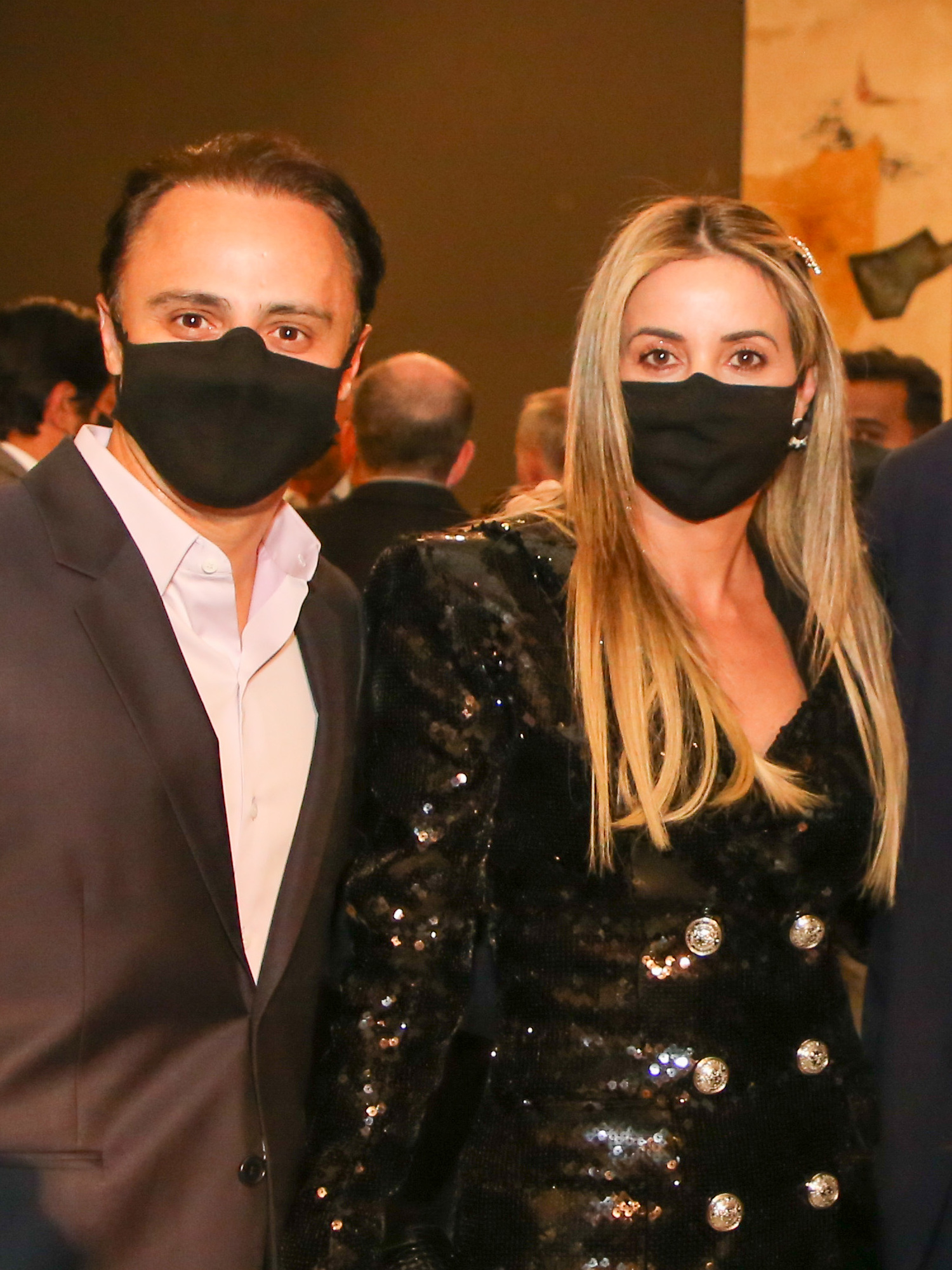
Massa and his wife, Anna Raffaela in 2021

Massa married Anna Raffaela Bassi on 30 November 2007, in São Paulo, Brazil. The couple's first son, Felipinho (Bassi Massa), was born on 30 November 2009.

Massa is a friend of Swiss watchmaker Richard Mille, who has dedicated several models of his watches to him (RM-005FM, RM-011).

Nicolas Todt, son of Ferrari's past team principal and former FIA president Jean Todt, is Massa's manager.

Though Massa supports Brazilian football team São Paulo FC, he also supports the Turkish football team Fenerbahçe that was formerly coached by Zico. On 24 August 2007, Massa said: "Zico was my childhood idol, Roberto Carlos is my best friend. I am a Fenerbahçe fan, because it is just like a Brazilian team. I love Turkey, as I won my first championship race in Turkey, it has special value for me."

Massa held a charity kart race, Desafio Internacional das Estrelas (International Challenge of the Stars) every year between 2005 and 2014. Notably, many active top level Brazilian drivers have competed in the event, such as Formula One drivers Rubens Barrichello and Nelson Piquet Jr., drivers who competed in American open wheel events such as Tony Kanaan, Mario Moraes, Felipe Giaffone, Vítor Meira, Roberto Moreno, and Gil de Ferran, and Stock Car Brasil champion Cacá Bueno. In addition, Brazilian motorcycle racer Alex Barros has competed. Michael Schumacher and Luca Badoer joined the Brazilian contingent in 2007. Vitantonio Liuzzi, Jeff Gordon and Jaime Alguersuari have also participated.

Massa was the president of the Commission Internationale de Karting from December 2017 until 2022, when he became the president of the FIA Drivers' Commission.

On 18 September 2012, Massa participated on a world record event at Silverstone where 964 Ferrari cars, 36 shy of their target of 1000, assembled together on the track. This spectacle was witnessed by 25,000 fans which features Massa's 2008 car driven by Ferrari test driver Marc Gené.

Massa has a strong Catholic faith. He is a São Paulo FC fan.

=== Legal action over 2008 F1 title ===
In March 2023, in an interview with German website F1-Insider, former Formula One Group chief executive Bernie Ecclestone was quoted saying that both he and then-FIA president Max Mosley were made aware of Renault's deliberate manipulation of the Singapore Grand Prix "during the 2008 season". He added: "We had enough information in time to investigate the matter. According to the statutes, we should have cancelled the race in Singapore under these conditions. That means it would never have happened for the championship standings. And then Felipe Massa would have become world champion and not Lewis Hamilton." Despite this, Ecclestone said they decided not to act in order to "protect the sport and save it from a huge scandal". Following Ecclestone's comments, Massa reportedly started investigating whether he could take legal action to challenge the outcome of the 2008 championship. Massa started legal action against the FIA and FOM in 2023, leading to a trial scheduled for 2026.

== Helmet ==
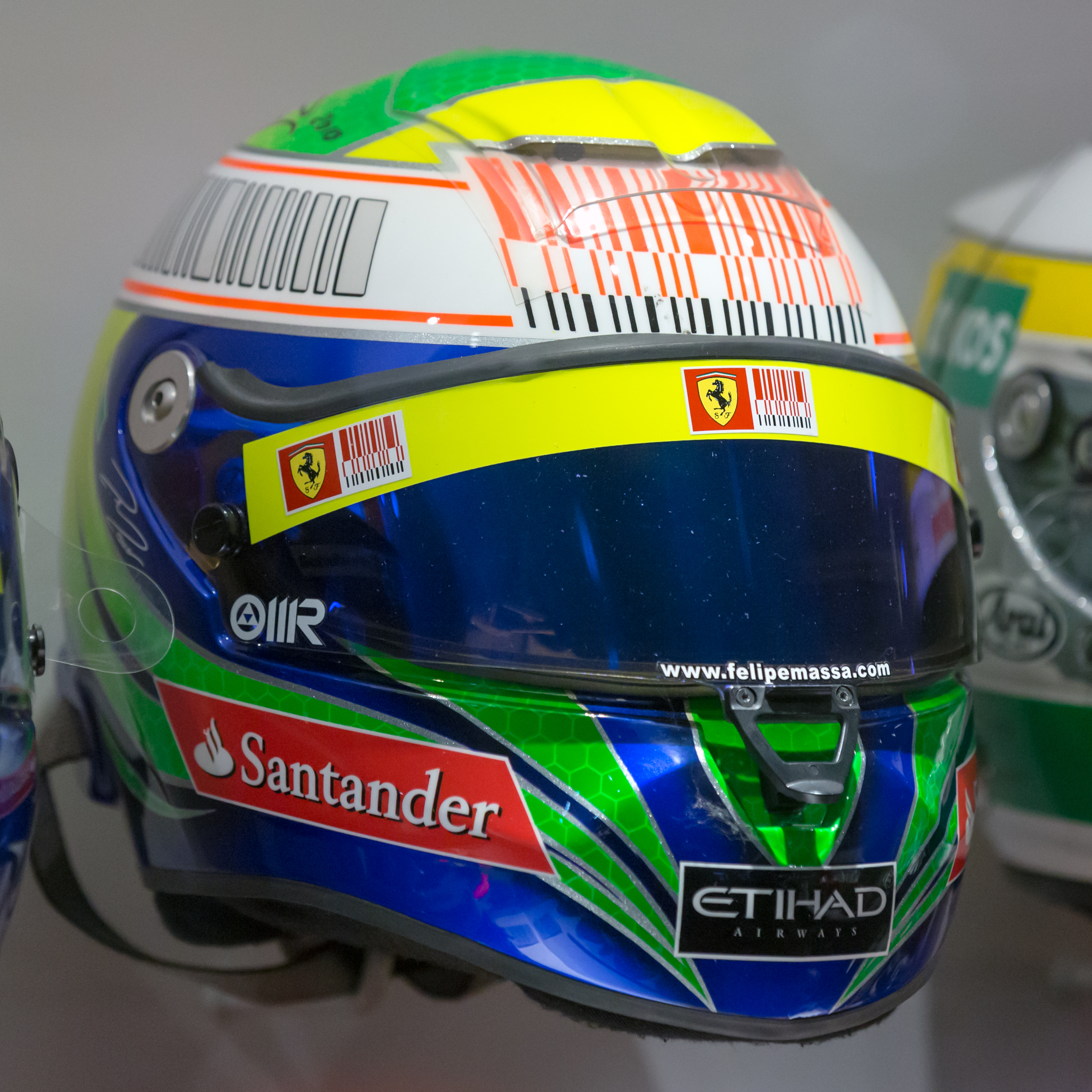
Massa's helmet from 2010 at Ferrari

Massa's helmet was blue with a fluorescent yellow X on the sides and a yellow triangle that covers the upper helmet with the top section coloured with a green gradient (prior to F1, this section was blue), in Ferrari early years until 2010, Massa's helmet featured also a white ring surrounding the top. In 2008 the tips of the fluoro yellow X were more ramified. In 2011 on the yellow triangle covered the entire upper front with 2 blue lines in the sides. For his 100th race with Ferrari at the 2011 Brazilian Grand Prix, Massa sported a chrome and gold prancing horse on the top with a further 100 horses representing the races Massa contested with Ferrari. The design also featured gold, blue and green spreading out over the helmet.

== Racing record ==
=== Career summary ===
Season	Series	Team	Races	Wins	Poles	F/Laps	Podiums	Points	Position
1998	Formula Chevrolet Brazil	?	?	?	?	?	?	?	5th
1999	Formula Chevrolet Brazil	Team MasterCard	10	3	?	?	?	?	**1st**
2000	Formula Renault 2000 Eurocup	Cram Competition	9	3	?	?	4	140	**1st**
2000	Formula Renault 2000 Italy	Cram Competition	8	4	4	3	5	147	**1st**
2001	Euro Formula 3000	Draco Junior Team	8	6	6	5	6	60	**1st**
2001	European Supertouring Championship	Team Nordauto	4	0	0	0	0	71	23rd
2001	24 Hours of Sicily	Alfa Romeo	1	0	0	0	1	N/A	**2nd**
2002	Formula One	Sauber Petronas	16	0	0	0	0	4	13th
2003	Formula One	Scuderia Ferrari Marlboro	Test driver						
2004	Formula One	Sauber Petronas	18	0	0	0	0	12	12th
2005	Formula One	Sauber Petronas	19	0	0	0	0	11	13th
2006	Formula One	Scuderia Ferrari Marlboro	18	2	3	2	7	80	**3rd**
2006	Desafio Internacional das Estrelas		2	1	1	0	1	38	**1st**
2007	Formula One	Scuderia Ferrari Marlboro	17	3	6	6	10	94	4th
2008	Formula One	Scuderia Ferrari Marlboro	18	6	6	3	10	97	**2nd**
2009	Formula One	Scuderia Ferrari Marlboro	10	0	0	1	1	22	11th
2010	Formula One	Scuderia Ferrari Marlboro	19	0	0	0	5	144	6th
2011	Formula One	Scuderia Ferrari	19	0	0	2	0	118	6th
2012	Formula One	Scuderia Ferrari	20	0	0	0	2	122	7th
2013	Formula One	Scuderia Ferrari	19	0	0	0	1	112	8th
2014	Formula One	Williams Martini Racing	19	0	1	1	3	134	7th
2015	Formula One	Williams Martini Racing	19	0	0	0	2	121	6th
2016	Formula One	Williams Martini Racing	21	0	0	0	0	53	11th
2017	Formula One	Williams Martini Racing	20	0	0	0	0	43	11th
2018	Stock Car Brasil	Cimed Chevrolet Team	2	0	0	0	0	0	NC†
2018–19	Formula E	Venturi Formula E Team	13	0	0	0	1	36	15th
2019–20	Formula E	ROKiT Venturi Racing	11	0	0	0	0	3	22nd
2020	Porsche Endurance Series	?	3	0	0	0	0	166	5th
2021	Stock Car Brasil	Lubrax Podium	24	0	0	0	0	88	24th
2022	Stock Car Pro Series	Lubrax Podium	22	0	0	0	0	98	24th
2023	Stock Car Pro Series	Lubrax Podium	24	2	0	0	5	224	10th
2024	Stock Car Pro Series	TMG Racing	24	1	0	1	7	885	**2nd**
2024	IMSA SportsCar Championship - LMP2	Riley	1	0	0	0	1	328	39th
2025	Stock Car Pro Series	TMG Racing	23	0	1	0	1	492	17th
2025	IMSA SportsCar Championship - LMP2	Riley	1	0	0	0	1	343	43rd
2026	Stock Car Pro Series	Time Lubrax TMG	19	0	0	1	2	576	9th*
2026	Porsche Carrera Cup Brasil	Dener Motorsport							
2026	GT Winter Series - Cup 2	AF Motorsport	3	1	0	0	1	20	43rd

^{†} As Massa was a guest driver, he was ineligible for points.
^{*} Season still in progress.

=== Complete Formula Renault 2000 Italia results ===
(key) (Races in bold indicate pole position; races in italics indicate fastest lap)

Year	Entrant	1	2	3	4	5	6	7	8	9	10	DC	Points
2000	Cram Competition	IMO; 1	MGI; Ret	**VAR**; Ret	**MNZ**; 1	**VLL**; 14	**VLL**; 1	PER; 3	BIN	MIS	VAL; 1	1st	147

=== Complete Euro Formula 3000 results ===
(key) (Races in bold indicate pole position; races in italics indicate fastest lap)

Year	Entrant	1	2	3	4	5	6	7	8	DC	Points
2001	Draco Junior Team	**VLL**; 1	**PER**; 1	MNZ; 1	DON; 8	**ZOL**; Ret	**IMO**; 1	**NÜR**; 1	**VAL**; 1	1st	60

=== Complete European Supertouring Championship results ===
(key)

Year	Team	Car	1	2	3	4	5	6	7	8	9	10	11	12	13	14	15	16	17	18	19	20	DC	Points
2001	Team Nordauto	Alfa Romeo 156	MNZ; 1	MNZ; 2	BRN; 1	BRN; 2	MAG; 1	MAG; 2	SIL; 1	SIL; 2	ZOL; 1	ZOL; 2	HUN; 1	HUN; 2	A1R; 1	A1R; 2	NÜR; 1	NÜR; 2	JAR; 1; 14	JAR; 2; 6	EST; 1; 5	EST; 2 Ret	23rd	71

=== Complete Formula One results ===
(key) (Races in bold indicate pole position; races in italics indicate fastest lap)

Year	Entrant	Chassis	Engine	1	2	3	4	5	6	7	8	9	10	11	12	13	14	15	16	17	18	19	20	21	WDC	Points
2002	Red Bull Sauber Petronas	Sauber C21	Petronas 02A 3.0 V10	AUS; Ret	MAL; 6	BRA; Ret	SMR; 8	ESP; 5	AUT; Ret	MON; Ret	CAN; 9	EUR; 6	GBR; 9	FRA; Ret	GER; 7	HUN; 7	BEL; Ret	ITA; Ret	USA	JPN; Ret					13th	4
2004	Red Bull Sauber Petronas	Sauber C23	Petronas 04A 3.0 V10	AUS; Ret	MAL; 8	BHR; 12	SMR; 10	ESP; 9	MON; 5	EUR; 9	CAN; Ret	USA; Ret	FRA; 13	GBR; 9	GER; 13	HUN; Ret	BEL; 4	ITA; 12	CHN; 8	JPN; 9	BRA; 8				12th	12
2005	Sauber Petronas	Sauber C24	Petronas 05A 3.0 V10	AUS; 10	MAL; 10	BHR; 7	SMR; 10	ESP; 11^{†}	MON; 9	EUR; 14	CAN; 4	USA; DNS	FRA; Ret	GBR; 10	GER; 8	HUN; 14	TUR; Ret	ITA; 9	BEL; 10	BRA; 11	JPN; 10	CHN; 6			13th	11
2006	Scuderia Ferrari Marlboro	Ferrari 248 F1	Ferrari 056 2.4 V8	BHR; 9	MAL; 5	AUS; Ret	SMR; 4	EUR; 3	ESP; 4	MON; 9	GBR; 5	CAN; 5	USA; 2	FRA; 3	GER; 2	HUN; 7	**TUR**; 1	ITA; 9	CHN; Ret	**JPN**; 2	**BRA**; 1				3rd	80
2007	Scuderia Ferrari Marlboro	Ferrari F2007	Ferrari 056 2.4 V8	AUS; 6	**MAL**; 5	**BHR**; 1	**ESP**; 1	MON; 3	CAN; DSQ	USA; 3	**FRA**; 2	GBR; 5	EUR; 2	HUN; 13	**TUR**; 1	ITA; Ret	BEL; 2	JPN; 6	CHN; 3	**BRA**; 2					4th	94
2008	Scuderia Ferrari Marlboro	Ferrari F2008	Ferrari 056 2.4 V8	AUS; Ret	**MAL**; Ret	BHR; 1	ESP; 2	**TUR**; 1	**MON**; 3	CAN; 5	FRA; 1	GBR; 13	GER; 3	HUN; 17^{†}	**EUR**; 1	BEL; 1	ITA; 6	**SIN**; 13	JPN; 7	CHN; 2	**BRA**; 1				2nd	97
2009	Scuderia Ferrari Marlboro	Ferrari F60	Ferrari 056 2.4 V8	AUS; Ret	MAL; 9	CHN; Ret	BHR; 14	ESP; 6	MON; 4	TUR; 6	GBR; 4	GER; 3	HUN; WD	EUR	BEL	ITA	SIN	JPN	BRA	ABU					11th	22
2010	Scuderia Ferrari Marlboro	Ferrari F10	Ferrari 056 2.4 V8	BHR; 2	AUS; 3	MAL; 7	CHN; 9	ESP; 6	MON; 4	TUR; 7	CAN; 15	EUR; 11	GBR; 15	GER; 2	HUN; 4	BEL; 4	ITA; 3	SIN; 8	JPN; Ret	KOR; 3	BRA; 15	ABU; 10			6th	144
2011	Scuderia Ferrari Marlboro	Ferrari 150º Italia	Ferrari 056 2.4 V8	AUS; 7	MAL; 5	CHN; 6	TUR; 11	ESP; Ret	MON; Ret	CAN; 6	EUR; 5	GBR; 5	GER; 5	HUN; 6	BEL; 8	ITA; 6	SIN; 9	JPN; 7	KOR; 6	IND; Ret	ABU; 5	BRA; 5			6th	118
2012	Scuderia Ferrari	Ferrari F2012	Ferrari 056 2.4 V8	AUS; Ret	MAL; 15	CHN; 13	BHR; 9	ESP; 15	MON; 6	CAN; 10	EUR; 16	GBR; 4	GER; 12	HUN; 9	BEL; 5	ITA; 4	SIN; 8	JPN; 2	KOR; 4	IND; 6	ABU; 7	USA; 4	BRA; 3		7th	122
2013	Scuderia Ferrari	Ferrari F138	Ferrari 056 2.4 V8	AUS; 4	MAL; 5	CHN; 6	BHR; 15	ESP; 3	MON; Ret	CAN; 8	GBR; 6	GER; Ret	HUN; 8	BEL; 7	ITA; 4	SIN; 6	KOR; 9	JPN; 10	IND; 4	ABU; 8	USA; 12	BRA; 7			8th	112
2014	Williams Martini Racing	Williams FW36	Mercedes PU106A Hybrid 1.6 V6 t	AUS; Ret	MAL; 7	BHR; 7	CHN; 15	ESP; 13	MON; 7	CAN; 12^{†}	**AUT**; 4	GBR; Ret	GER; Ret	HUN; 5	BEL; 13	ITA; 3	SIN; 5	JPN; 7	RUS; 11	USA; 4	BRA; 3	ABU; 2			7th	134
2015	Williams Martini Racing	Williams FW37	Mercedes PU106B Hybrid 1.6 V6 t	AUS; 4	MAL; 6	CHN; 5	BHR; 10	ESP; 6	MON; 15	CAN; 6	AUT; 3	GBR; 4	HUN; 12	BEL; 6	ITA; 3	SIN; Ret	JPN; 17	RUS; 4	USA; Ret	MEX; 6	BRA; DSQ	ABU; 8			6th	121
2016	Williams Martini Racing	Williams FW38	Mercedes PU106C Hybrid 1.6 V6 t	AUS; 5	BHR; 8	CHN; 6	RUS; 5	ESP; 8	MON; 10	CAN; Ret	EUR; 10	AUT; 20^{†}	GBR; 11	HUN; 18	GER; Ret	BEL; 10	ITA; 9	SIN; 12	MAL; 13	JPN; 9	USA; 7	MEX; 9	BRA; Ret	ABU; 9	11th	53
2017	Williams Martini Racing	Williams FW40	Mercedes M08 EQ Power+ 1.6 V6 t	AUS; 6	CHN; 14	BHR; 6	RUS; 9	ESP; 13	MON; 9	CAN; Ret	AZE; Ret	AUT; 9	GBR; 10	HUN; WD	BEL; 8	ITA; 8	SIN; 11	MAL; 9	JPN; 10	USA; 9	MEX; 11	BRA; 7	ABU; 10		11th	43

^{†} Driver failed to finish the race, but was classified as they had completed more than 90% of the race distance.

=== Complete Formula E results ===
(key) (Races in bold indicate pole position; races in italics indicate fastest lap)

Year	Team	Chassis	Powertrain	1	2	3	4	5	6	7	8	9	10	11	12	13	Pos	Points
2018–19	Venturi Formula E Team	Spark SRT05e	Venturi VFE05	ADR; 17	MRK; 18	SCL; Ret	MEX; 8	HKG; 5	SYX; 10	RME; Ret	PAR; 9	MON; 3	BER; 15	BRN; 8	NYC; 16†	NYC; 15	15th	36
2019–20	ROKiT Venturi Racing	Spark SRT05e	Mercedes-Benz EQ Silver Arrow 01	DIR; 12	DIR; 18	SCL; 9	MEX; Ret	MRK; 17	BER; Ret	BER; NC	BER; 19	BER; 10	BER; 13	BER; 16			22nd	3

^{†} Did not finish, but was classified as he had completed more than 90% of the race distance.

=== Complete Stock Car Pro Series results ===
(key) (Races in bold indicate pole position) (Races in italics indicate fastest lap)

Year	Team	Car	1	2	3	4	5	6	7	8	9	10	11	12	13	14	15	16	17	18	19	20	21	22	23	24	25	Rank	Points
2018	Cimed Racing	Chevrolet Cruze	INT; 1; 13	CUR; 1	CUR; 2	VEL; 1	VEL; 2	LON; 1	LON; 2	SCZ; 1	SCZ; 2	GOI; 1; 22	MOU; 1	MOU; 2	CAS; 1	CAS; 2	VCA; 1	VCA; 2	TAR; 1	TAR; 2	GOI; 1	GOI; 2	INT; 1					NC†	0†
2021	Lubrax Podium	Chevrolet Cruze	GOI; 1; 25	GOI; 2; 17	INT; 1; 15	INT; 2; 7	VCA; 1 Ret	VCA; 2 Ret	VCA; 1; 16	VCA; 2; 15	CAS; 1; 16	CAS; 2; 13	CUR; 1; 15	CUR; 2; 23	CUR; 1 Ret	CUR; 2; 13	GOI; 1 Ret	GOI; 2; 13	GOI; 1; 26	GOI; 2; 20	VCA; 1 Ret	VCA; 2; 20	SCZ; 1; 17	SCZ; 2 Ret	INT; 1; 19	INT; 2; 16		24th	88
2022	Lubrax Podium	Chevrolet Cruze	INT; 1; 26	GOI; 1; 21	GOI; 2; 15	RIO; 1; 6	RIO; 2; 22	VCA; 1; 17	VCA; 2; 12	VEL; 1; 20	VEL; 2; 16	VEL; 1 Ret	VEL; 2 DNS	INT; 1; 8	INT; 2; 8	VCA; 1; 21	VCA; 2; 19	SCZ; 1 Ret	SCZ; 2; 17	GOI; 1; 24	GOI; 2 Ret	GOI; 1 Ret	GOI; 2; 15	INT; 1; 6	INT; 2; 16			24th	98
2023	TMG Racing	Chevrolet Cruze	GOI; 1; 21	GOI; 2 Ret	INT; 1; 16	INT; 2 Ret	TAR; 1; 20	TAR; 2; 11	CAS; 1; 23	CAS; 2; 12	INT; 1; 3	INT; 2; 2	VCA; 1; 12	VCA; 2; 11	GOI; 1; 12	GOI; 2; 21	VEL; 1; 17	VEL; 2 Ret	BUE; 1; 12	BUE; 2; 7	VCA; 1; 5	VCA; 2; 2	CAS; 1; 9	CAS; 2; 1	INT; 1; 14	INT; 2; 1		10th	224
2024	TMG Racing	Chevrolet Cruze	GOI; 1; 23	GOI; 2; 2	VCA; 1; 1	VCA; 2 C	INT; 1; 2	INT; 2; 15	CAS; 1; 16	CAS; 2; 6	VCA; 1; 25	VCA; 2; 4	VCA; 3; 9	GOI; 1; 7	GOI; 2; 2	BLH; 1; 13	BLH; 2; 9	VEL; 1 DSQ	VEL; 2 DSQ	BUE; 1; 3	BUE; 2; 3	URU; 1; 21	URU; 2; 4	GOI; 1; 14	GOI; 2; 13	INT; 1; 5	INT; 2; 2	2nd	885
2025	TMG Racing	Chevrolet Tracker	INT; 1 Ret	CAS; 1; 16	CAS; 2; 22	VEL; 1 Ret	VEL; 2 Ret	VCA; 1; 6	VCA; 2 Ret	CRS; 1; 4	CRS; 2; 4	CAS; 1; 20	CAS; 2; 18	VCA; 1; 22	VCA; 2; 20	VCA; 1; 19	VCA; 2; 3	MOU; 1; 11	MOU; 2 Ret	CUI; 1; 6	**CUI**; **2**; 11	BRA; 1 DSQ	BRA; 2; 7	INT; 1; 19	INT; 2; 13			17th	492
2026	Time Lubrax TMG	Chevrolet Tracker	CRS; 1; 10	CRS; 2; 7	CAS; 1; 9	CAS; 2; 2	INT; 1; 13	INT; 2; 11	GOI; 1; 4	GOI; 2; 8	CUI; 1; 2	CUI; 2; 19	VCA; 1; 23	VCA; 2; 11	SCZ; 1; 7	SCZ; 2; 25	CRS; 1; 21	CRS; 2; 15	BRA; 1 Ret	CAS; 1; 5	CAS; 2 Ret	VEL; 1	INT; 1	INT; 2				9th*	576*

^{†} As Massa was a guest driver, he was ineligible for points. ^{*} Season still in progress.

=== Complete IMSA SportsCar Championship results ===
(key) (Races in bold indicate pole position; results in italics indicate fastest lap)

Year	Entrant	Class	Make	Engine	1	2	3	4	5	6	7	Rank	Points
2024	Riley	LMP2	Oreca 07	Gibson GK428 4.2 L V8	DAY; 3	SEB	WGL	MOS	ELK	IMS	PET	39th	328
2025	Riley	LMP2	Oreca 07	Gibson GK428 V8	DAY; 2	SEB	WGL	MOS	ELK	IMS	PET	43rd	343

== See also ==
- Formula One drivers from Brazil

Sporting positions
Preceded by Gianmaria Bruni	Eurocup Formula Renault; Champion; 2000	Succeeded by Augusto Farfus
Preceded by Inaugural	Italian Formula Renault Championship; Champion; 2000	Succeeded by Ryan Briscoe
Preceded by Ricardo Sperafico	Euro Formula 3000; Champion; 2001	Succeeded by Jaime Melo
Preceded by Daniel Serra	Desafio Internacional das Estrelas; Winner; 2006	Succeeded by Michael Schumacher
Awards and achievements
Preceded by Mark Webber	Lorenzo Bandini Trophy; 2007	Succeeded by Robert Kubica
