= Ferrari F60 =

2009 Formula One racing car

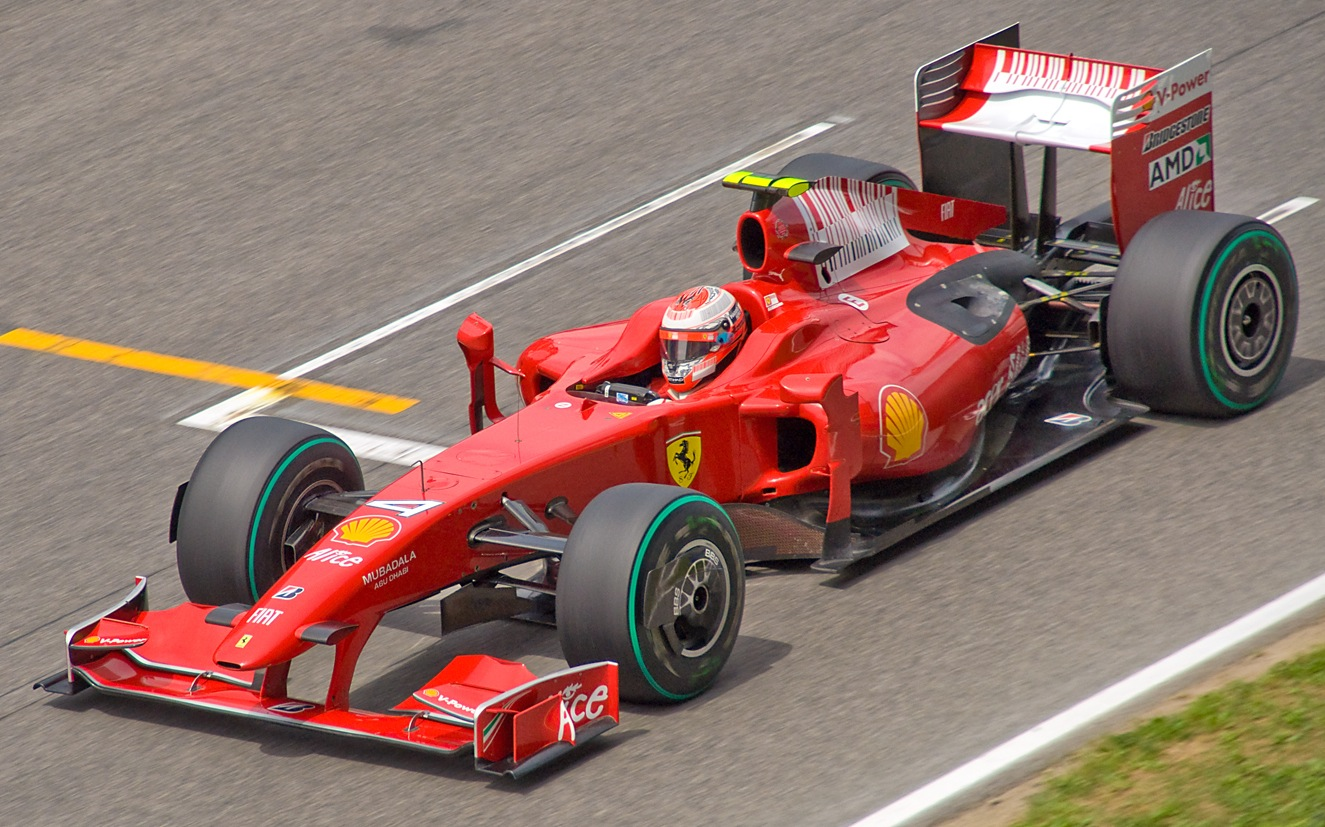
- Kimi Räikkönen driving the F60 at the Spanish Grand Prix
- Category: Formula One
- Constructor: Scuderia Ferrari
- Designers: Mario Almondo (Executive Operations Director); Aldo Costa (Technical Director); Nikolas Tombazis (Chief Designer); Marco Fainello (Head of Vehicle Performance); Tiziano Battistini (Head of Chassis Design); Simone Resta (Head of R&D); John Iley (Head of Aerodynamics); Marco de Luca (Chief Aerodynamicist); Gilles Simon (Engine Technical Director); Lorenzo Sassi (Engine Chief Designer); Gérald Brussoz (KERS Project Leader)
- Predecessor: Ferrari F2008
- Successor: Ferrari F10

Technical specifications
- Chassis: carbon-fibre and honeycomb composite monocoque
- Suspension (front): Independent suspension, pushrod activated torsion springs
- Suspension (rear): As front
- Engine: Ferrari Tipo 056-2009 2398cc V8 (90°) 18,000 RPM-Limited with KERS Mid engine rear wheel drive
- Transmission: Ferrari 7 speeds + reverse Semiautomatic sequential, electronically controlled, longitudinal gearbox, quick-shift Limited-slip differential
- Weight: 605 kg (1,333.8 lb) (including driver, water and lubricant)
- Fuel: Shell V-Power ULG 66L/2 Fuel; Shell Lubricant
- Tyres: Bridgestone; BBS Wheels (front and rear): 13"

Competition history
- Notable entrants: Scuderia Ferrari
- Notable drivers: 3. (Brazil) Felipe Massa; 3. (Italy) Luca Badoer; 3. (Italy) Giancarlo Fisichella; 4. (Finland) Kimi Räikkönen
- Debut: 2009 Australian Grand Prix
- First win: 2009 Belgian Grand Prix
- Last win: 2009 Belgian Grand Prix
- Last event: 2009 Abu Dhabi Grand Prix
Races	Wins	Podiums	Poles	F/Laps
17	1	6	0	1

The Ferrari F60 is a Formula One racing car, which Scuderia Ferrari used to compete in the 2009 Formula One season.

The chassis was designed by Aldo Costa, Simone Resta, Tiziano Battistini, Marco Fainello, John Iley and Marco de Luca with Mario Almondo playing a vital role in leading the production of the car as the team's Executive Technical Director and with Giles Simon in charge of the engine and electronics division assisted by Lorenzo Sassi (engine design and development) and Mattia Binotto (engine operations).

The car was unveiled on 12 January 2009.

== Background ==
=== Naming and launching ===
The F60, the 55th single-seater car produced by Ferrari to compete in Formula One, was named F60 to celebrate the fact that 2009 is Ferrari's 60th year in Formula One, the only team to have competed every year. It was first launched online on 12 January 2009, and Felipe Massa undertook the debut run of the car with a shakedown at Mugello later that day. The car was initially intended to debut at Ferrari's home Fiorano track, but the venue was changed due to poor weather conditions at Maranello.

=== Testing ===
The F60's first full test took place at the Mugello Circuit during the week of 19 January 2009.

== Technology ==
On average, the Ferrari F60 was 1.9 seconds faster than the last car, despite the new regulations. In the 2009 season, FIA banned the large bargeboards in front of the radiator and the sidepods. It also placed limits on the wheelbase, making it shorter, simpler front wing, narrower rear wing and certain underside air flows, so that it was less disruptive to the car behind. The Ferrari F60 responded to all of this by improving tiny details from the F2008. The front wing was located further away from the front wheel, and had only 1 layer. Ferrari claimed this improved air flow to the wheels. The F60 was only fitted with 1-tread slick tires, and a simpler suspension positioned a bit backward in angle. Ferrari removed the large airflow plates and replaced it with a small one, also adjusting some underside air flow. The side mirrors were located at the edge of the car's floor. The FIA's ban on small side wings led to the creation of a "cleaner" sidepods acceptable of the smaller engine, and a smooth underside of the chassis. The rear diffuser was revised to meet the regulations that stated it had to produce less downforce.

== Season summary ==
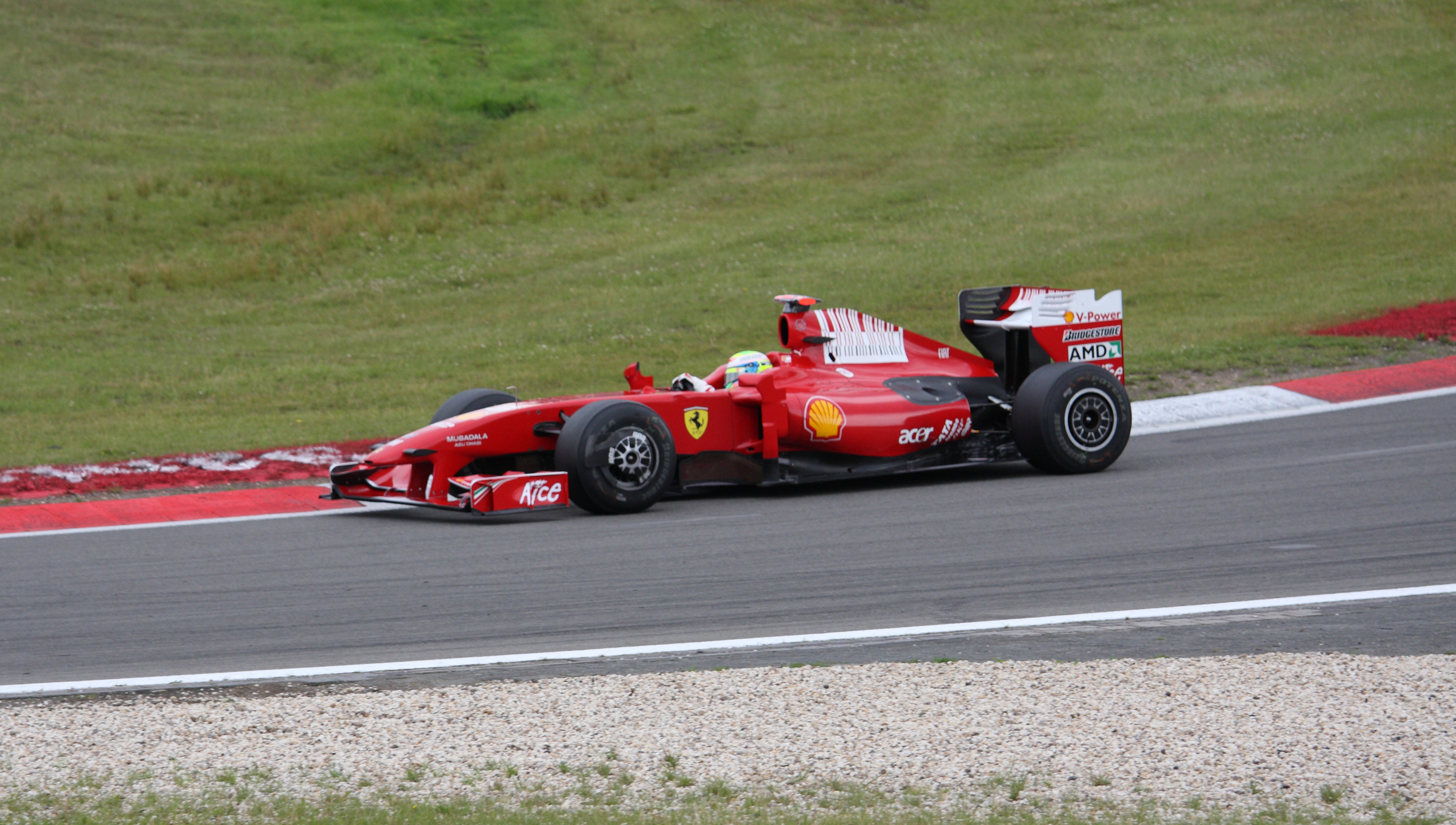
Massa driving the F60 at the German Grand Prix.

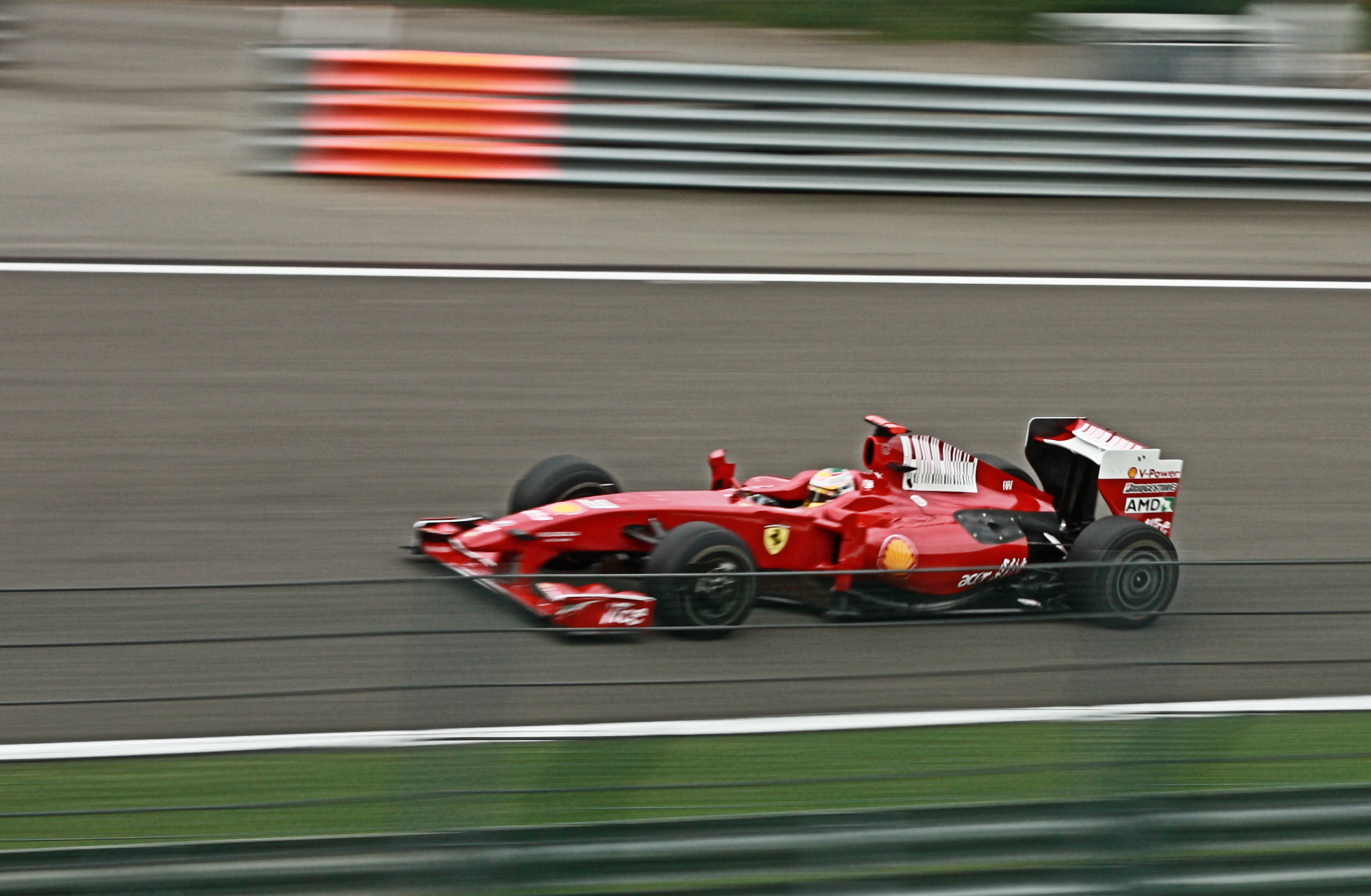
Badoer driving the F60 at the Belgian Grand Prix.

Fisichella replaced Badoer from the Italian Grand Prix onwards.

Ferrari F60

The 2009 season was disappointing in many ways for Ferrari. After scoring no points in the first three races of the season, the F60 scored its first points in Bahrain, the fourth race of the season. Kimi Räikkönen finished sixth, gaining three points for the team. Felipe Massa had a life-threatening accident in the Hungarian Grand Prix, when a spring broke loose from Rubens Barrichello's BGP car and struck Massa on his helmet. He did not start the race and for the rest of the season, he was replaced by Ferrari test driver, Luca Badoer, and later ex-Force India driver Giancarlo Fisichella. Neither driver was able to find any pace with the car and they failed to score any points for the team.

In early August 2009 Ferrari announced that they had stopped developing the F60 in order to concentrate on the 2010 car.

The F60 won its first and only race of 2009 at the hands of Räikkönen at the Belgian Grand Prix, after starting sixth on the grid. They eventually finished fourth in the constructors standings, just behind McLaren, and making 2009 the worst season for Ferrari since 1993. Räikkönen was Ferrari's highest points scoring driver in 2009, finishing sixth in the standings with 48 points, one adrift of fifth-placed Lewis Hamilton of McLaren.

== Sponsorship and livery ==
The livery remains very similar to that of 2008, mostly red with small white sections due to the Marlboro sponsorship.

At the Chinese Grand Prix, as a tribute to the victims of the 2009 L'Aquila earthquake collapse, Ferrari included a decal with the words "Abruzzo nel cuore." for the race weekend on their cars.

== Later uses ==
Due to its poor performance, the F60 became a popular choice for demonstrations in the liveries of the 150° Italia, F14 T, SF16-H and F1-75.

== Complete Formula One results ==
(key) (results in bold indicate pole position; results in italics indicate fastest lap)

Year	Entrant	Engine	Tyres	Drivers	1	2	3	4	5	6	7	8	9	10	11	12	13	14	15	16	17	Points	WCC
2009	Scuderia Ferrari Marlboro	Ferrari 056 V8	**B**		AUS	MAL	CHN	BHR	ESP	MON	TUR	GBR	GER	HUN	EUR	BEL	ITA	SIN	JPN	BRA	ABU	70	4th
2009	Scuderia Ferrari Marlboro	Ferrari 056 V8	**B**	Massa	Ret	9	Ret	14	6	4	6	4	3	DNS								70	4th
2009	Scuderia Ferrari Marlboro	Ferrari 056 V8	**B**	Badoer											17	14						70	4th
2009	Scuderia Ferrari Marlboro	Ferrari 056 V8	**B**	Fisichella													9	13	12	10	16	70	4th
2009	Scuderia Ferrari Marlboro	Ferrari 056 V8	**B**	Räikkönen	15^{†}	14	10	6	Ret	3	9	8	Ret	2	3	1	3	10	4	6	12	70	4th
