= Ferrari 248 F1 =

2006 Formula One racing car by Ferrari

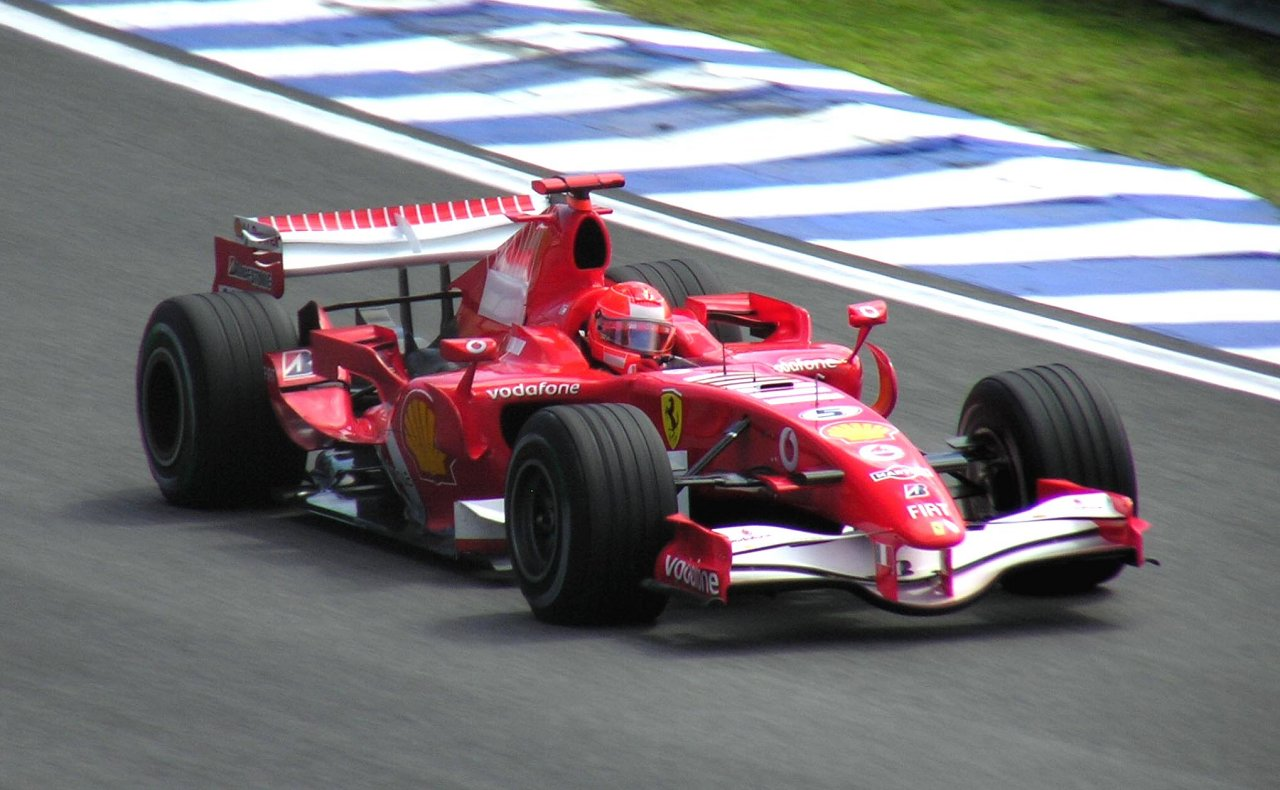
- Michael Schumacher driving the 248 F1 at the 2006 Brazilian Grand Prix
- Category: Formula One
- Constructor: Ferrari
- Designers: Ross Brawn (Technical Director); Rory Byrne (Design and Development Director); Gérald Brussoz (Head of R&D); Aldo Costa (Chief Designer); Marco Fainello (Head of Vehicle Dynamics); Tiziano Battistini (Head of Chassis Design); Roberto Dalla (Head of Electronics); John Iley (Head of Aerodynamics); Marco de Luca (Chief Aerodynamicist); Paolo Martinelli (Engine Technical Director); Gilles Simon (Engine Chief Designer)
- Predecessor: F2005
- Successor: F2007

Technical specifications
- Chassis: Carbon fibre and honeycomb composite structure
- Suspension (front): Independent suspension, push-rod activated torsion springs
- Suspension (rear): Independent suspension, push-rod activated torsion springs
- Engine: Ferrari Tipo 056-2006 2.4L 146 cu in (2,398 cc) 90° V8, Naturally Aspirated, mid longitudinally mounted
- Transmission: Ferrari longitudinal gearbox limited-slip differential, 7 gears + reverse
- Power: 785 hp @ 19,000 rpm
- Weight: 600 kg (1,322.8 lb)
- Fuel: Shell V-Power
- Tyres: Bridgestone

Competition history
- Notable entrants: Scuderia Ferrari Marlboro (1-3, 7, 16-17); Scuderia Ferrari (4-6, 8-15, 18)
- Notable drivers: 5. (Germany) Michael Schumacher; 6. (Brazil) Felipe Massa
- Debut: 2006 Bahrain Grand Prix
- First win: 2006 San Marino Grand Prix
- Last win: 2006 Brazilian Grand Prix
- Last event: 2006 Brazilian Grand Prix
Races	Wins	Podiums	Poles	F/Laps
18	9	19	7	9
- Constructors' Championships: 0
- Drivers' Championships: 0

The Ferrari 248 F1 is a Formula One car, used by Ferrari for the 2006 season. The chassis was designed by Rory Byrne, Simone Resta, Aldo Costa, Tiziano Battistini, Marco Fainello, John Iley and Marco de Luca with Ross Brawn playing a vital role in leading the production of the car as the team's Technical Director and Paolo Martinelli assisted by Giles Simon (engine design and development) and Mattia Binotto (engine operations).

== Background, design and technical specifications ==
=== Naming ===
The car was named after its V8 engine: 24 is the capacity in decilitres, and 8 the number of cylinders. The name broke the F200x system used from 2001 to 2005 and returned to a system similar to that used in the 1950s and 1960s (cf. Ferrari 312) but they did revert to the previous system the following year with the F2007.

=== Chassis ===
The car was an update of the previous year's F2005. Although the V8 engine is shorter than the V10 used in the F2005, the wheelbase is actually the same, reported to be 3,050 mm. The wheelbase was retained via a new longer gearbox casing. The 248 F1 is the last Ferrari Formula One race car to use the single keel technology.

The 248 was Aldo Costa's project as Rory Byrne was taking more of a consultancy role within Ferrari.

==== Aerodynamics ====
Some notable features of the new model were the rear view mirrors, which were mounted on the edge of the sidepods of the car rather than conventional position beside the cockpit.

At the start of the season the car featured a triple plane front wing. After the first three races, it was replaced by a twin plane wing, in order to generate more airflow to the underside and diffuser.

Revised rear bodywork was introduced for the French Grand Prix, with a more waisted lower body around the exhausts.

=== Engine ===
The engine has been reported to have had a power output of 730 bhp (544 kW; 740 PS) at the start of the 2006 season, but modifications throughout the year boosted the power to around 785 bhp (585 kW; 796 PS) by the season's end.

== Season summary ==
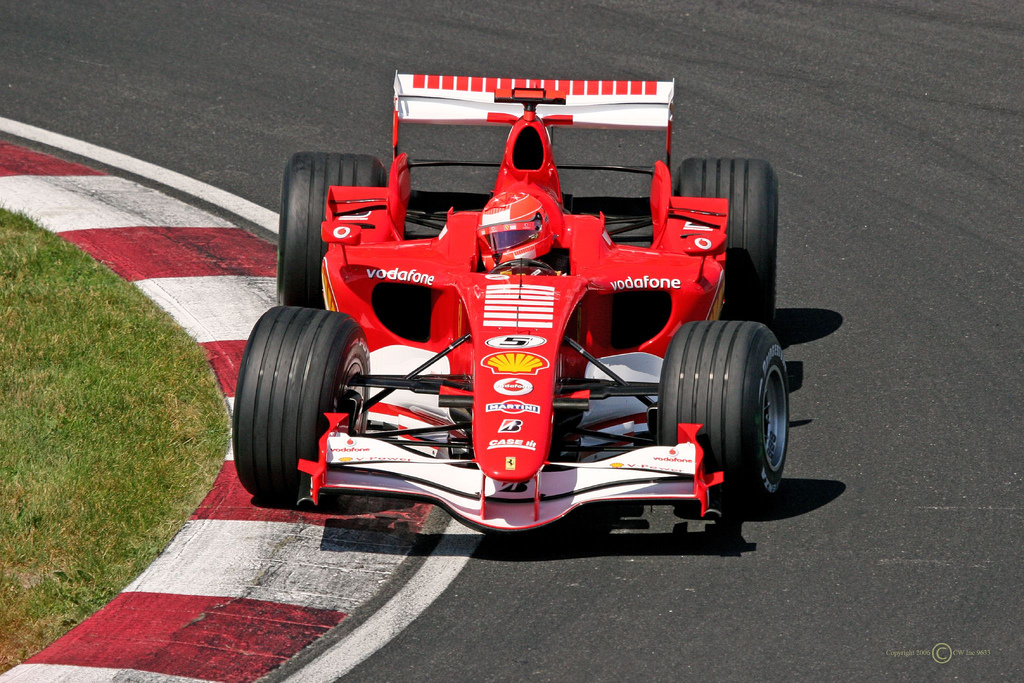
Michael Schumacher driving the 248 F1 at the 2006 Canadian Grand Prix.

The 248 F1 was used by Ferrari in every race of the 2006 season, unlike in other recent seasons (2002, 2003 and 2005), in which the team had used the previous year's car at the start of the season, while developing a new car.

The car performed well in qualifying at the season opener, the Bahrain Grand Prix, with an all Ferrari front row. However the performance of the car was generally not as fast as the Renault R26 in the first half of the season. At the Malaysian Grand Prix, the car suffered significant technical problems - a piston problem meant that both drivers had to change their engines during the weekend, incurring qualifying penalties, and for the race the engine speed was limited to prevent a failure. This problem continued to affect the car for the Australian Grand Prix.

An aerodynamic upgrade introduced for the San Marino Grand Prix brought the pace of the car to approximately level with the Renault. At the United States Grand Prix, in Indianapolis, Ferrari were dominant all weekend, resulting in the first Ferrari one-two finish since the same race 12 months beforehand. This seemed to represent a genuine turning point for the car's competitiveness. Modifications throughout the season continued to improve the car's performance, to the point where it was considered the fastest package of all for the remainder of the season – the car won 7 of the last 9 races of the season. Massa claimed his maiden win at the Turkish Grand Prix and later won his home race in Brazil. As a result of the car's improved form, Ferrari and Schumacher were able to close the gap to Renault and Fernando Alonso in their respective championships. However, Schumacher suffered an engine failure while leading the Japanese Grand Prix which effectively ended his title hopes and Ferrari eventually lost out on the Constructor's title by only 5 points to Renault. The 248 did give Schumacher his final Formula 1 win in China.

While Massa took an emotional win at the final race in Brazil, it was Schumacher who put in a storming drive from almost a lap down because of a puncture to finish fourth in what was his last race before his first retirement from the sport.

Overall, the car gave Ferrari 9 race wins and 7 pole positions, and second-place finishes in both the Drivers' and Constructors' World Championship.

=== Post-season winter testing ===
The 248 F1 was used in testing prior to the 2007 season, and was the first Ferrari Formula One car which new Ferrari driver Kimi Räikkönen drove, in a test on 23 January 2007 at the Vallelunga circuit.

== Sponsorship and livery ==
The car had a new sponsorship from Martini. This was the final year for Vodafone sponsorship as they announce that they would switch to McLaren as title sponsor for the following season.

Ferrari used Marlboro logos, except at the countries that had a ban on tobacco advertising (San Marino, European, Spanish, British, Canadian, United States, French, German, Hungarian, Turkish, Italian and Brazilian Grands Prix). In France, the Martini logo was blocked out.

== Other ==
The 248 F1 appeared in Formula One 06, Formula One Championship Edition and Test Drive: Ferrari Racing Legends.

== Race results ==
(key) (results in bold indicate pole position; results in italics indicate fastest lap)

Year	Team	Engine	Tyres	Drivers	1	2	3	4	5	6	7	8	9	10	11	12	13	14	15	16	17	18	Points	WCC
2006	Scuderia Ferrari Marlboro	Ferrari V8	**B**		BHR	MAL	AUS	SMR	EUR	ESP	MON	GBR	CAN	USA	FRA	GER	HUN	TUR	ITA	CHN	JPN	BRA	**201**	**2nd**
2006	Scuderia Ferrari Marlboro	Ferrari V8	**B**	(Germany) Michael Schumacher	**2**	6	Ret	**1**	1	2	5	2	2	**1**	**1**	1	8^{†}	3	1	1	Ret	4	**201**	**2nd**
2006	Scuderia Ferrari Marlboro	Ferrari V8	**B**	(Brazil) Felipe Massa	9	5	Ret	4	3	4	9	5	5	2	3	2	7	**1**	9	Ret	**2**	**1**	**201**	**2nd**
