= DHL Fastest Lap Award =

Formula One award

- Sport: Motorsport
- Competition: Formula One
- Awarded for: "to recognise the driver who most consistently demonstrates pure speed, with the fastest lap at the highest number of races each season"

History
- First winner: Kimi Räikkönen (2007)
- Most wins: Lewis Hamilton (6)
- Most recent: Lando Norris (2025)

The DHL Fastest Lap Award is given annually by the courier, Formula One global partner and logistics provider DHL "to recognise the driver who most consistently demonstrates pure speed, with the fastest lap at the highest number of races each season", and to reward the winning driver for "characteristics such as excellent performance, passion, can-do attitude, reliability and precision". First awarded in 2007 by DHL, the trophy's official naming patron, it is presented to the driver with the highest number of fastest laps over the course of the season, with one point awarded to the fastest lap holder of a Grand Prix. In the event of a tie, there is a countback and the driver with the highest number of second-fastest laps earns the award. If this is also tied, third-fastest laps are considered, and so on, until a winner is found. The trophy is presented to the winning driver at the final round of the season.

The inaugural winner was the Ferrari driver Kimi Räikkönen with six fastest laps in 2007. The award has been decided on a tiebreaker on four occasions. Räikkönen and his teammate Felipe Massa tied with six fastest laps and two-second-quickest laps in 2007 with the former winning by having more third-fastest laps than the latter. In 2009, Red Bull Racing's Sebastian Vettel and his teammate Mark Webber had three fastest laps at the end of the season but Vettel won with two more second-fastest laps than the latter. Ferrari driver Fernando Alonso and McLaren's Lewis Hamilton each had five fastest laps in 2010 with Alonso finishing ahead with a higher number of second-best laps. In 2021, both Hamilton and Red Bull's Max Verstappen set six fastest laps with Hamilton declared the winner for recording more second-fastest laps than Verstappen.

British drivers have won the award seven times, German drivers four times, and Finnish racers three times. Mercedes have won on seven occasions to Red Bull Racing's six and Ferrari's three. The 2024 recipient was Lando Norris of the McLaren team with six fastest laps, the first time he and his team won the award.

== Winners ==
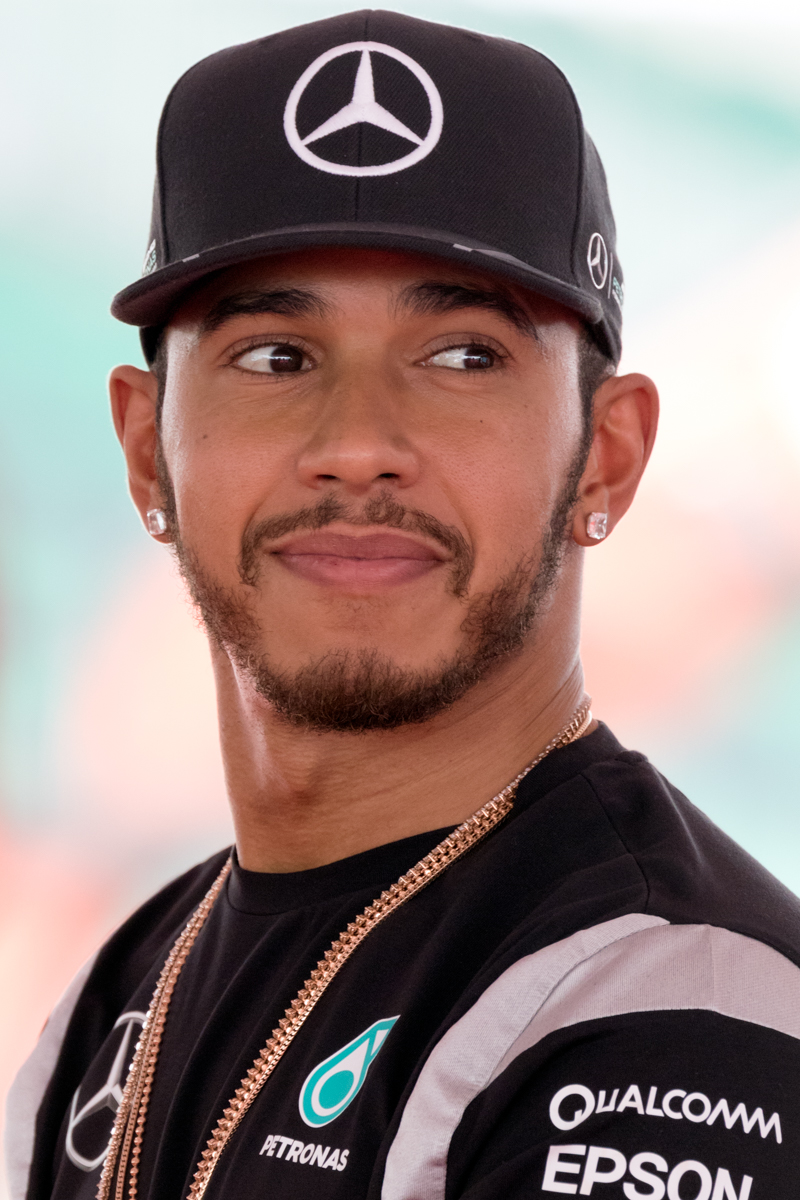
Lewis Hamilton (pictured in 2016) has won the award six times, more than any other driver

Key
*	Indicates driver won the Formula One World Drivers' Championship that season
**	Season still in progress

DHL Fastest Lap Award winners
Year	Winner	Nationality	Constructor	Car	Races	Fastest laps	Won	Ref(s)
2007	Kimi Räikkönen*	Finnish	Ferrari	Ferrari F2007	17	6	Race 17 of 17	
2008	Kimi Räikkönen	Finnish	Ferrari	Ferrari F2008	18	10	Race 13 of 18	
2009	Sebastian Vettel	German	Red Bull Racing	Red Bull RB5	17	3	Race 17 of 17	
2010	Fernando Alonso	Spanish	Ferrari	Ferrari F10	19	5	Race 19 of 19	
2011	Mark Webber	Australian	Red Bull Racing	Red Bull RB7	19	7	Race 18 of 19	
2012	Sebastian Vettel*	German	Red Bull Racing	Red Bull RB8	20	6	Race 18 of 20	
2013	Sebastian Vettel*	German	Red Bull Racing	Red Bull RB9	19	7	Race 17 of 19	
2014	Lewis Hamilton*	British	Mercedes	Mercedes F1 W05 Hybrid	19	7	Race 18 of 19	
2015	Lewis Hamilton*	British	Mercedes	Mercedes F1 W06 Hybrid	19	8	Race 18 of 19	
2016	Nico Rosberg*	German	Mercedes	Mercedes F1 W07 Hybrid	21	6	Race 20 of 21	
2017	Lewis Hamilton*	British	Mercedes	Mercedes AMG F1 W08 EQ Power+	20	7	Race 19 of 20	
2018	Valtteri Bottas	Finnish	Mercedes	Mercedes AMG F1 W09 EQ Power+	21	7	Race 20 of 21	
2019	Lewis Hamilton*	British	Mercedes	Mercedes AMG F1 W10 EQ Power+	21	6	Race 20 of 21	
2020	Lewis Hamilton*	British	Mercedes	Mercedes-AMG F1 W11 EQ Performance	17	6	Race 14 of 17	
2021	Lewis Hamilton	British	Mercedes	Mercedes-AMG F1 W12 E Performance	22	6	Race 21 of 22	
2022	Max Verstappen*	Dutch	Red Bull Racing	Red Bull Racing RB18	22	5	Race 21 of 22	
2023	Max Verstappen*	Dutch	Red Bull Racing	Red Bull Racing RB19	22	9	Race 19 of 22	
2024	Lando Norris	British	McLaren-Mercedes	McLaren MCL38	24	6	Race 23 of 24	
2025	Lando Norris*	British	McLaren-Mercedes	McLaren MCL39	24	6	Race 24 of 24	
2026	Kimi Antonelli*	Italian	Mercedes	Mercedes W17	20**	8**	Race 20 of 23	

== Statistics ==
Multiple winners
Wins	Driver	Years
6	Lewis Hamilton	2014, 2015, 2017, 2019, 2020, 2021
3	Sebastian Vettel	2009, 2012, 2013
2	Kimi Räikkönen	2007, 2008
2	Max Verstappen	2022, 2023
2	Lando Norris	2024, 2025

Winners by nationality
Country	Wins	Drivers
British	8	2
German	4	2
Finnish	3	2
Dutch	2	1
Australian	1	1
Italian	1	1
Spanish	1	1

Winners by constructor
Constructor	Wins	Drivers
Mercedes	9	4
Red Bull Racing	6	3
Ferrari	3	2
McLaren	2	1

== See also ==
- DHL Fastest Pit Stop Award
- List of Formula One drivers who set a fastest lap
