= Ferrari F2005 =

Formula One racing automobile

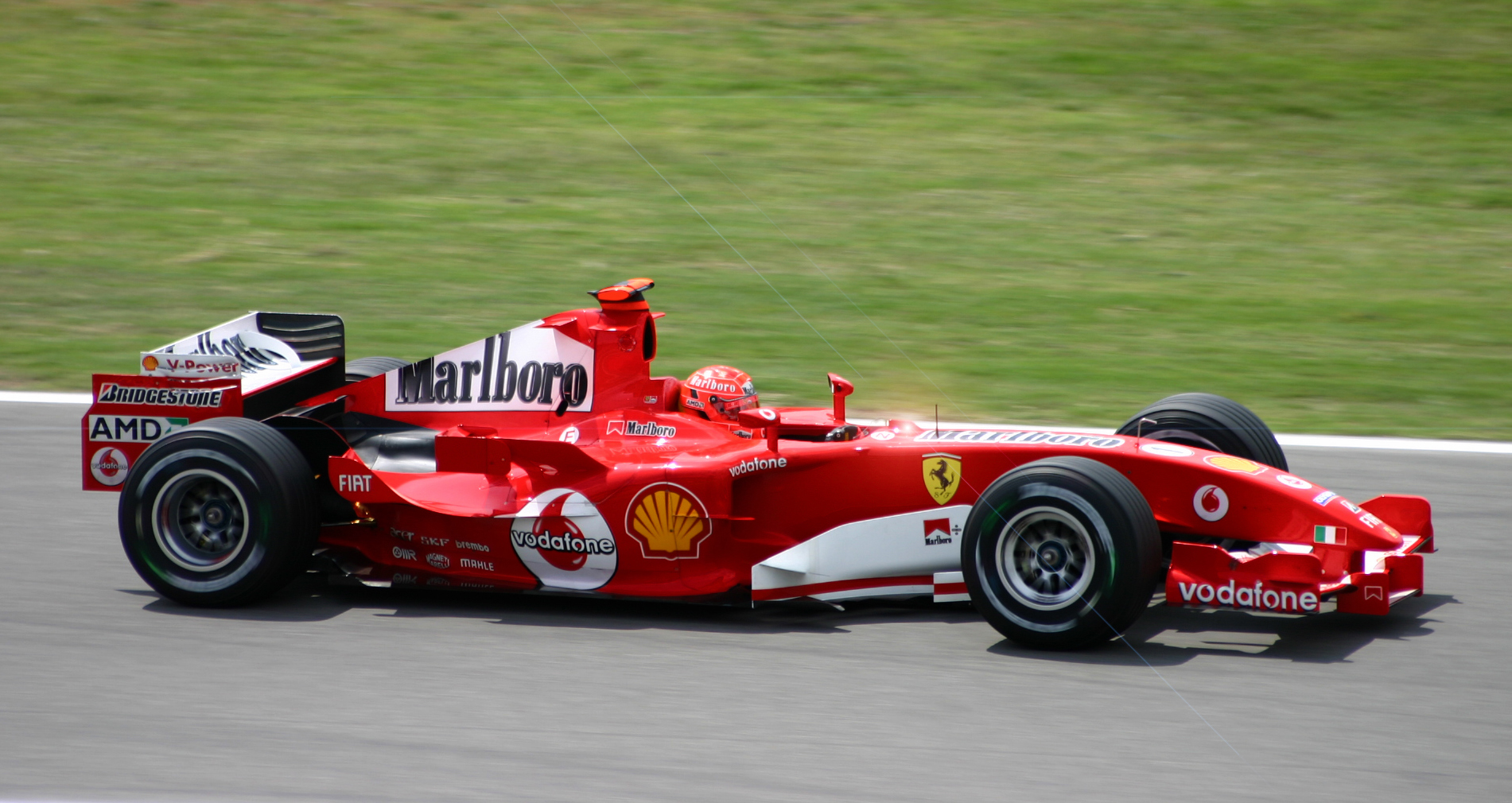
- Michael Schumacher driving the F2005 at the 2005 German Grand Prix
- Category: Formula One
- Constructor: Scuderia Ferrari
- Designers: Ross Brawn (Technical Director); Rory Byrne (Design and Development Director); Ignazio Lunetta (Head of R&D); Aldo Costa (Chief Designer); Marco Fainello (Head of Vehicle Engineering); Roberto Dalla (Head of Electronics); John Iley (Head of Aerodynamics); Marco de Luca (Chief Aerodynamicist); Paolo Martinelli (Engine Technical Director); Gilles Simon (Engine Chief Designer)
- Predecessor: F2004M
- Successor: 248 F1

Technical specifications
- Chassis: Carbon/epoxy composite monocoque
- Suspension (front): Independent suspension, push-rod activated torsion springs
- Suspension (rear): As front
- Length: 4,545 mm (179 in)
- Width: 1,796 mm (71 in)
- Height: 959 mm (38 in)
- Axle track: Front: 1,470 mm (58 in); Rear: 1,405 mm (55 in)
- Wheelbase: 3,050 mm (120 in)
- Engine: Ferrari Tipo 055 3.0 L (183 cu in) 90° V10 naturally-aspirated, mid-engined
- Transmission: 7-speed semi-automatic sequential paddle-shift gearbox + 1 reverse, Ferrari differential
- Power: 865 hp @ 18,300 rpm (race-spec); 900-940 hp @ 19,000 rpm (qualifying trim)
- Weight: 1,334 lb (605 kg) with driver
- Fuel: Shell V-Power Racing
- Lubricants: Shell Helix
- Tyres: Bridgestone Potenza

Competition history
- Notable entrants: Scuderia Ferrari Marlboro (3-7, 12-13, 17-19); Scuderia Ferrari (8-11, 14-16)
- Notable drivers: 1. (Germany) Michael Schumacher; 2. (Brazil) Rubens Barrichello
- Debut: 2005 Bahrain Grand Prix
- First win: 2005 United States Grand Prix
- Last win: 2005 United States Grand Prix
- Last event: 2005 Chinese Grand Prix
| Races | Wins | Podiums | Poles | F/Laps |
|---|---|---|---|---|
| 17 | 1 | 8 | 1 | 3 |
- Constructors' Championships: 0
- Drivers' Championships: 0

The Ferrari F2005 is a Formula One racing car used by Ferrari for the 2005 Formula One World Championship. The chassis was designed by Rory Byrne, Ignazio Lunetta, Aldo Costa, Marco Fainello, John Iley and Marco de Luca with Ross Brawn playing a vital role in leading the production of the car as the team's Technical Director and Paolo Martinelli assisted by Giles Simon (engine design and development) and Mattia Binotto (engine operations).

This was the last Ferrari Formula One car to feature a V10 engine.

== Overview ==
After six straight seasons of Ferrari winning the Constructors' Championship, and five straight Drivers' Championships, the F2005 was not nearly as successful a car as its predecessors, notching only a single victory, subsequently Ferrari scored their lowest result in the constructors since 1995. The main reason for Ferrari's lack of form was down to the Bridgestone tyres the team used, which were poor in comparison to the Michelin tyres that were used by the majority of teams that were competing against Ferrari (Renault, McLaren, Toyota, Williams, BAR, Red Bull Racing and Sauber all had Michelin) in respect to a new rule for the 2005 season dictating that races had to be completed without tyre changes.

At the car's launch, Ross Brawn stated that the F2005 was an evolution of previous cars and design ideas simply adapted to the new regulations for the season. Minor changes had been made over the previous car to improve airflow and conserve the tyres as much as possible. Originally intended to debut in Spain, the F2005 was pressed into service earlier in Bahrain, once it became clear that Renault and McLaren had superior cars and better pace.

Another reason for the car's uncompetitiveness was aero rule changes that year which encouraged the teams to generate more downforce from the central part of the diffuser. Ferrari's engine and gearbox design prevented them from opening up the diffuser as much as they would have liked.

The car is also notable for appearing during the opening ceremony of the 2006 Winter Olympics, driven by Luca Badoer. During the ceremony, there was a pit stop demo by the Ferrari pit crew, and Badoer performed donuts as well. As a result, this made the car the only Formula One car to appear during an Olympic opening or closing ceremony.

== Season review ==
The F2005 was unreliable in its debut event. Although Michael Schumacher qualified on the front row, he retired with hydraulic failure just a few laps into the race; Barrichello only managed four timed laps over the whole weekend before the race (including his two qualifying runs), but did finish in 9th position.

The best result achieved all season was a one-two finish at the United States Grand Prix, where, due to Michelin claiming that their tyres were unsafe, only six cars competed (Ferrari, Jordan and Minardi all raced on Bridgestone tyres, the tyre they had been using all season). This was to be Ferrari's and Michael Schumacher's only race win of the season. The tyres were seen as the overriding reason why the car was off the pace all season.

Ross Brawn admitted the car had aerodynamic problems and the gearbox was quite bulky compared to previous designs, but refused to blame Aldo Costa for the shortcomings.

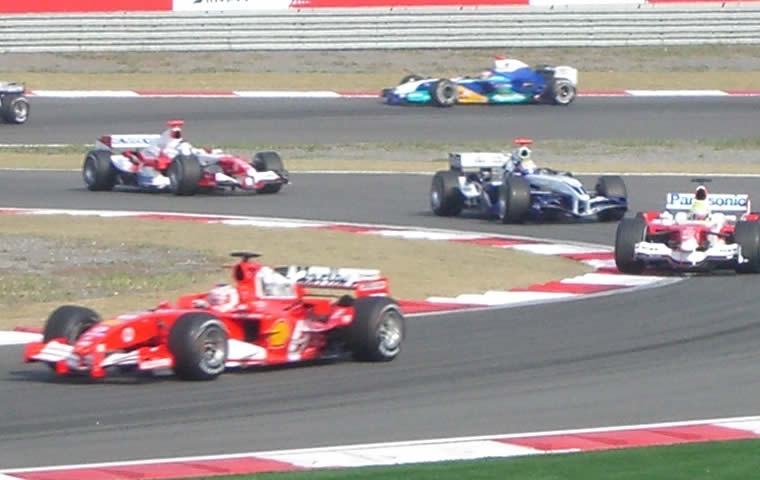
Rubens Barrichello's F2005 at the 2005 Chinese Grand Prix

The most competitive races for Ferrari where all twenty cars competed were at the San Marino and Hungarian Grands Prix. At Imola, Michael Schumacher qualified thirteenth after making a mistake in the second qualifying session the day before, but on race day Bridgestone were at their most competitive, with Michael storming through the field to challenge eventual race winner Fernando Alonso, putting a huge amount of pressure on the 2005 World Champion, but being unable to find a way past. As for the Hungarian Grand Prix, Michael Schumacher qualified on pole, almost a second ahead of second placed Juan Pablo Montoya (McLaren-Mercedes) and led the race on a track where the Michelin tyre was expected to hold an advantage over their Japanese rivals. Michael had a light fuel load, and was eventually beaten by McLaren driver Kimi Räikkönen, who at the end of the day had a better pit stop strategy. Apart from those two races, Ferrari often never looked in contention for race victories, and eventually finished a distant third in the Constructors' Championship, with Michael Schumacher and Rubens Barrichello suffering their worst championship positions in recent memory with Schumacher scoring 62 points, and Barrichello only 38 points. Barrichello left for the Honda team by the end of the season, and was replaced by fellow Brazilian Felipe Massa for the 2006 season.

== Sponsorship and livery ==
Ferrari used the 'Marlboro' logos, except at the Canadian, United States, French, British, Turkish, Italian and Belgian Grands Prix.

At the Bahrain Grand Prix, the F2005 sporting a black tipped nose cone, mourning the death of Pope John Paul II.

== Complete Formula One results ==
(key) (results in bold indicate pole position; results in italics indicate fastest lap)

| Year | Chassis | Engine | Tyres | Drivers | 1 | 2 | 3 | 4 | 5 | 6 | 7 | 8 | 9 | 10 | 11 | 12 | 13 | 14 | 15 | 16 | 17 | 18 | 19 | Points | WCC |
|---|---|---|---|---|---|---|---|---|---|---|---|---|---|---|---|---|---|---|---|---|---|---|---|---|---|
| 2005 | F2005 | Ferrari V10 | **B** | | AUS | MAL | BHR | SMR | ESP | MON | EUR | CAN | USA | FRA | GBR | GER | HUN | TUR | ITA | BEL | BRA | JPN | CHN | 100* | 3rd |
| 2005 | F2005 | Ferrari V10 | **B** | (Germany) Michael Schumacher | | | Ret | 2 | Ret | 7 | 5 | 2 | 1 | 3 | 6 | 5 | **2** | Ret | 10 | Ret | 4 | 7 | Ret | 100* | 3rd |
| 2005 | F2005 | Ferrari V10 | **B** | (Brazil) Rubens Barrichello | | | 9 | Ret | 9 | 8 | 3 | 3 | 2 | 9 | 7 | 10 | 10 | 10 | 12 | 5 | 6 | 11 | 12 | 100* | 3rd |

* 90 of the 100 points were scored with the F2005
