= Ferrari F2007 =

2007 Formula One racing car

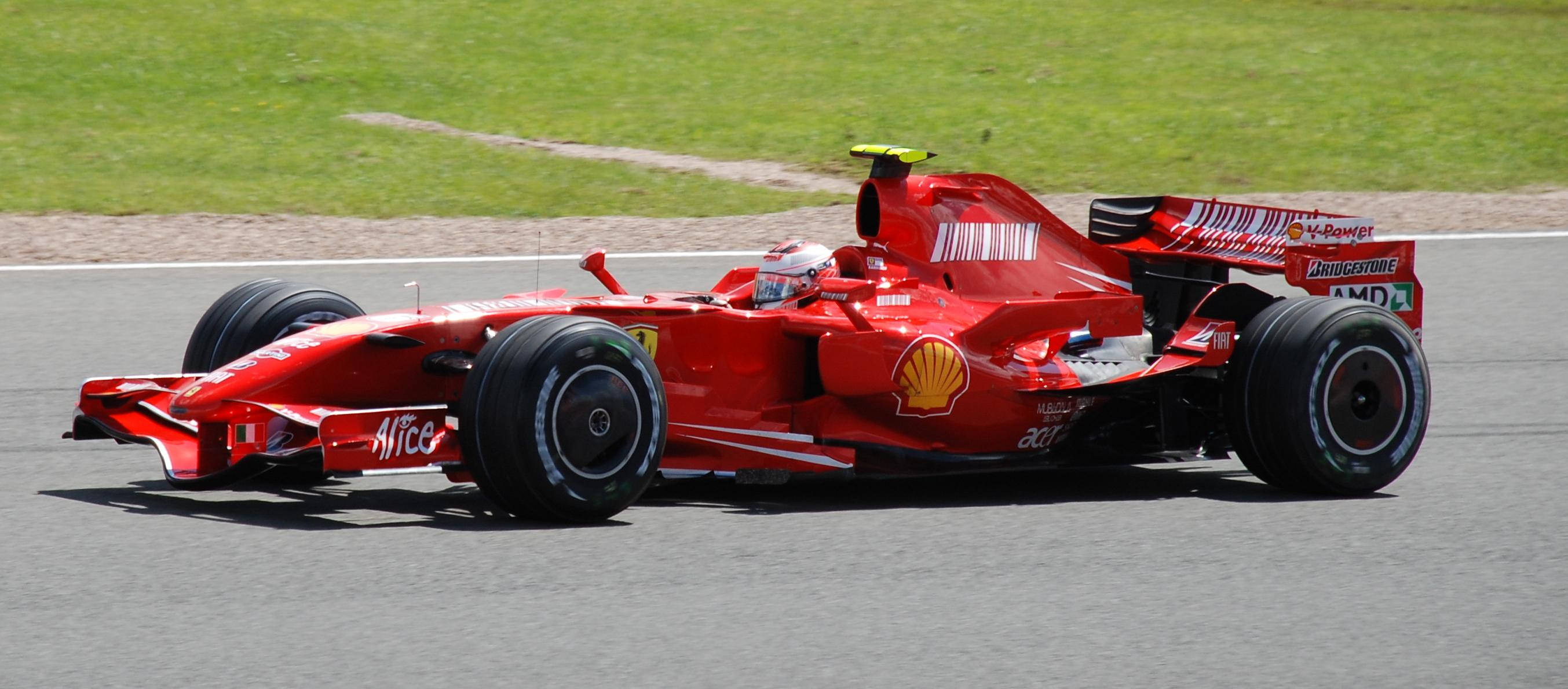
- Kimi Räikkönen driving the F2007 at the 2007 British Grand Prix
- Category: Formula One
- Constructor: Scuderia Ferrari
- Designers: Mario Almondo (Executive Technical Director); Aldo Costa (Design and Development Director); Nikolas Tombazis (Chief Designer); Marco Fainello (Head of Vehicle Performance); Tiziano Battistini (Head of Chassis Design); Simone Resta (Head of R&D); Roberto Dalla (Head of Electronics); John Iley (Head of Aerodynamics); Marco de Luca (Chief Aerodynamicist); Gilles Simon (Engine Technical Director); Lorenzo Sassi (Engine Chief Designer)
- Predecessor: 248 F1
- Successor: F2008

Technical specifications
- Chassis: Carbon-fibre and honeycomb composite monocoque
- Suspension (front): Zero-keel double wishbone, push-rod activated inboard spring/damper
- Suspension (rear): Double wishbone suspension Independent suspension, torsion bars, Sachs rotary damper, Eibach springs
- Engine: Ferrari Tipo 056-2007 2.4-litre 90-degree V8, naturally-aspirated, mid-engine, longitudinally-mounted
- Transmission: Ferrari 7-speed transverse gearbox "Quick Shift", carbon fibre casing
- Power: 800 hp @ 19,000 RPM
- Fuel: Shell V-Power
- Tyres: Bridgestone

Competition history
- Notable entrants: Scuderia Ferrari Marlboro (3, 5, 16); Scuderia Ferrari (1-2, 4, 6-15, 17)
- Notable drivers: 5. (Brazil) Felipe Massa; 6. (Finland) Kimi Räikkönen
- Debut: 2007 Australian Grand Prix
- First win: 2007 Australian Grand Prix
- Last win: 2007 Brazilian Grand Prix
- Last event: 2007 Brazilian Grand Prix
Races	Wins	Podiums	Poles	F/Laps
17	9	22	9	12
- Constructors' Championships: 1 (2007)
- Drivers' Championships: 1 (2007, Kimi Räikkönen)

The Ferrari F2007 is a Formula One motor racing car that was constructed by Scuderia Ferrari Marlboro to compete in the 2007 FIA Formula One World Championship. The F2007 was the fifty-third single-seater car which the team have built to use in Formula One.

The chassis was designed by Aldo Costa, Simone Resta, Tiziano Battistini, Marco Fainello, John Iley and Marco de Luca with Mario Almondo playing a vital role in leading the production of the car as the team's Executive Technical Director and with Giles Simon in charge of the engine and electronics division assisted by Lorenzo Sassi (engine design and development) and Mattia Binotto (engine operations).

As part of new FIA rules for the 2008 season which included banning driver aids via the introduction of a standard ECU for all teams, the F2007 was the last Ferrari Formula One car to use traction control.

The car is best known for providing Kimi Räikkönen with his only World Championship title and the team with its first Constructor's title since Michael Schumacher helped them win the 2004 Formula One season. As of 2026, this is the last Ferrari F1 car to win the drivers' title.

The car was unveiled to the public on January 14, 2007 at Ferrari's Fiorano test track in Maranello, Italy.

== Chassis ==
The chassis was significantly altered from the 248 F1, the car Ferrari used during 2006 to finish as runners-up to Renault in the Constructors' Championship. The wheelbase is 85mm longer, from 3050mm to 3135mm, with the extra length added between the cockpit and front wheels, in order to maximize aerodynamic performance.

== Aerodynamics ==
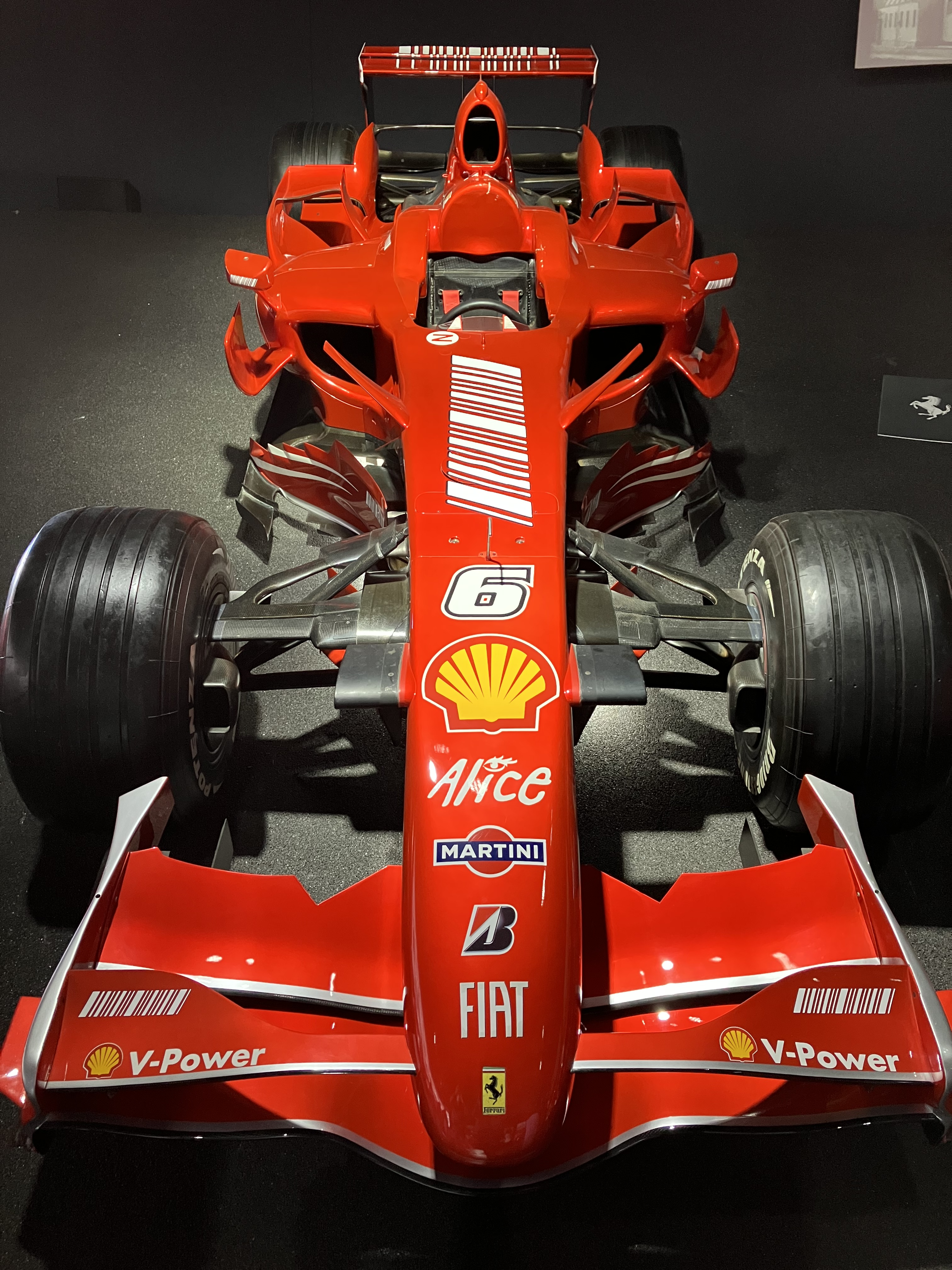
F2007 at the Museo Ferrari

The launch model was shown with the front and rear wings from the 248 F1. This was to keep various aerodynamic features secret from rival F1 teams.

== Mechanicals ==
The gearbox itself, which is still mounted longitudinally, is fitted with an innovative quick-shift system (seven plus reverse). The suspension adopts a zero-keel configuration, a first for Ferrari. The dropping of the single-keel is most likely due to the departure of previous designer Rory Byrne, whose previous, ultra-successful designs (notably his championship-winning Ferrari and Benetton cars) all featured a single keel.

== Sponsorship and livery ==
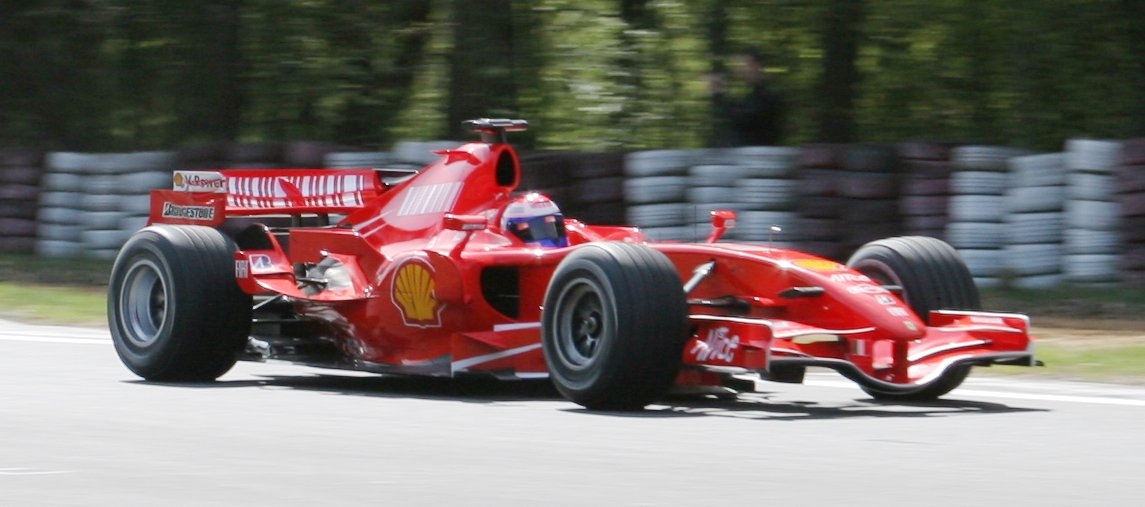
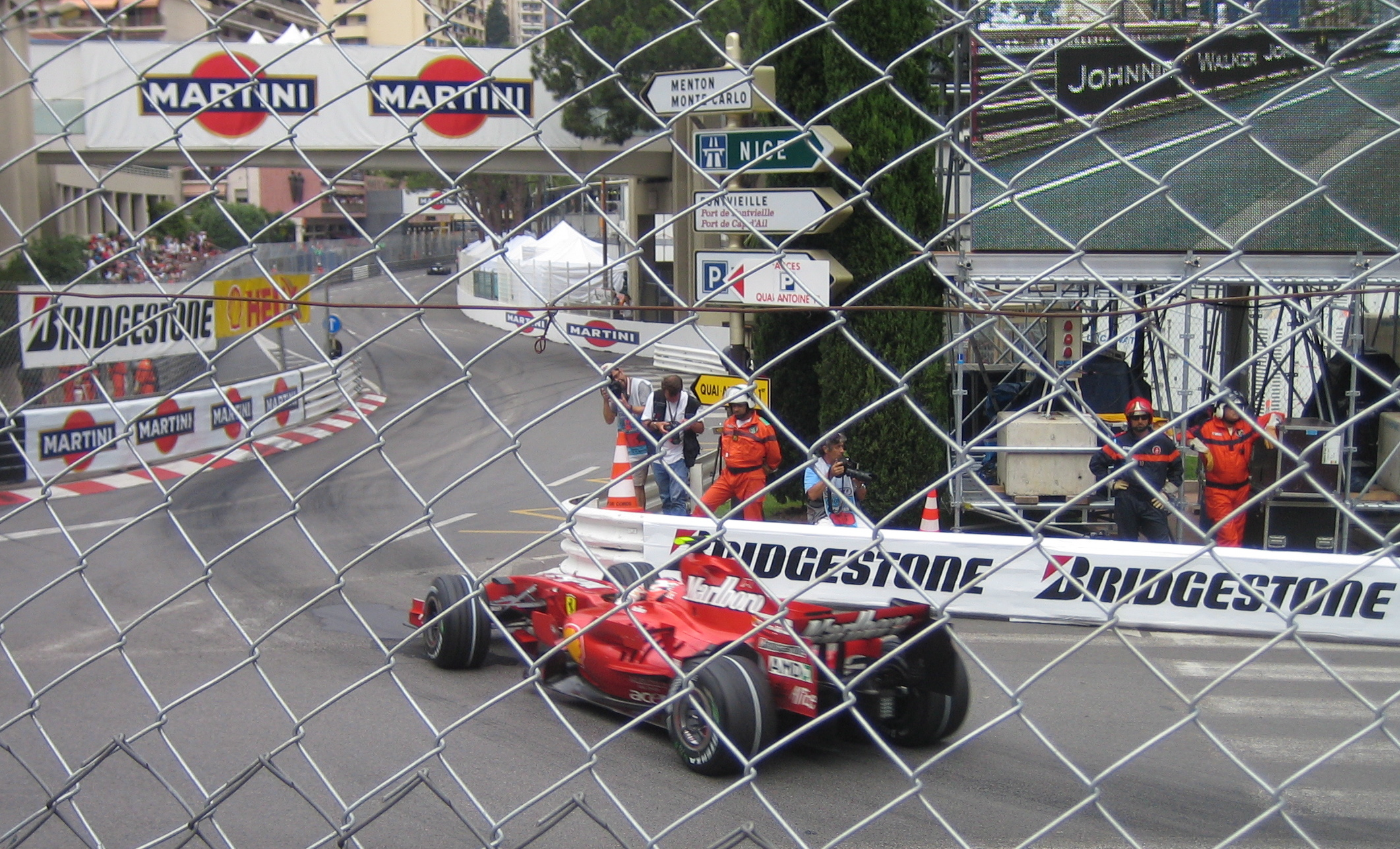
The F2007 with the barcode livery (left) and the Marlboro livery (right)

Ferrari were the only team to receive tobacco sponsorship for the 2007 season. The team's principal sponsor is Philip Morris International, parent company of Marlboro cigarettes. However, in order to circumvent the European tobacco advertising ban, the car's livery did not feature the brand name. A simple red and white "barcode" was used and, hence the advertising at European Grands Prix was purely through association. Ferrari used 'Marlboro' logos in Bahrain, Monaco and China. The Chinese race was the last where cigarette advertising was openly displayed on a Formula One car, that being the Marlboro sponsorship of Ferrari.

The livery featured significantly less white than in previous years. The cars, driven by Felipe Massa and Kimi Räikkönen, raced with the numbers 5 and 6 respectively as the team finished second in the 2006 Constructors' Championship. Ordinarily, this would mean numbers 3 and 4 for the following season but owing to World Champion Fernando Alonso changing teams to McLaren, Renault received these numbers as Fernando Alonso took his number 1 (and thus, number 2) to his new team.

At the Spanish Grand Prix, the Ferrari cars featured a logo celebrating the manufacturer's 60-year history; it consisted of a stylized white number "6" and a silver sphere (representing the number "0") containing the classic yellow Scuderia Ferrari "prancing horse" emblem on a red background, with the text "1947 Ferrari 2007" underneath.

At the Monaco Grand Prix, Ferrari changed the colour of their cars from Rosso Scuderia (light red) to Nuovo Rosso Scuderia (a darker shade), and kept it for the remainder of the season.

Martini returned for the second year with the team, however the logo was blocked out in France due to alcohol advertising being outlawed there.

== Other ==
An attempted sabotage of the car's fuel system was made prior to the Monaco Grand Prix by then Ferrari Head of Performance Development Nigel Stepney. Stepney, then a senior engineer at Ferrari, was involved in the 2007 Formula One espionage controversy with McLaren engineer Mike Coughlan, was dismissed as a result of this incident. McLaren meanwhile made a formal allegation that the Ferrari F2007 that won at the Australian Grand Prix had done so with illegal features discovered through the contact with Stepney.

The 2007 season was the first in which the use of two different rubber compounds was required during a race.

The Ferrari F2007 is featured in the games Gran Turismo 5, Gran Turismo 5 Prologue, Gran Turismo PSP, Test Drive: Ferrari Racing Legends, F1 2017, F1 2018, F1 2019 and F1 2020.

== Complete Formula One results ==
(key) (results in bold indicate pole position; results in italics indicate fastest lap)

Year	Team	Engine	Tyres	Drivers	1	2	3	4	5	6	7	8	9	10	11	12	13	14	15	16	17	Points	WCC
2007	Scuderia Ferrari Marlboro	Ferrari 056 2.4 V8	**B**		AUS	MAL	BHR	ESP	MON	CAN	USA	FRA	GBR	EUR	HUN	TUR	ITA	BEL	JPN	CHN	BRA	**204**	**1st**
2007	Scuderia Ferrari Marlboro	Ferrari 056 2.4 V8	**B**	(Brazil) Felipe Massa	6	**5**	**1**	**1**	3	DSQ	3	**2**	5	2	13	**1**	Ret	2	6	3	**2**	**204**	**1st**
2007	Scuderia Ferrari Marlboro	Ferrari 056 2.4 V8	**B**	(Finland) Kimi Räikkönen	**1**	3	3	Ret	8	5	4	1	1	**Ret**	2	2	3	**1**	3	1	1	**204**	**1st**
