= Ferrari F2008 =

2008 Formula One racing car

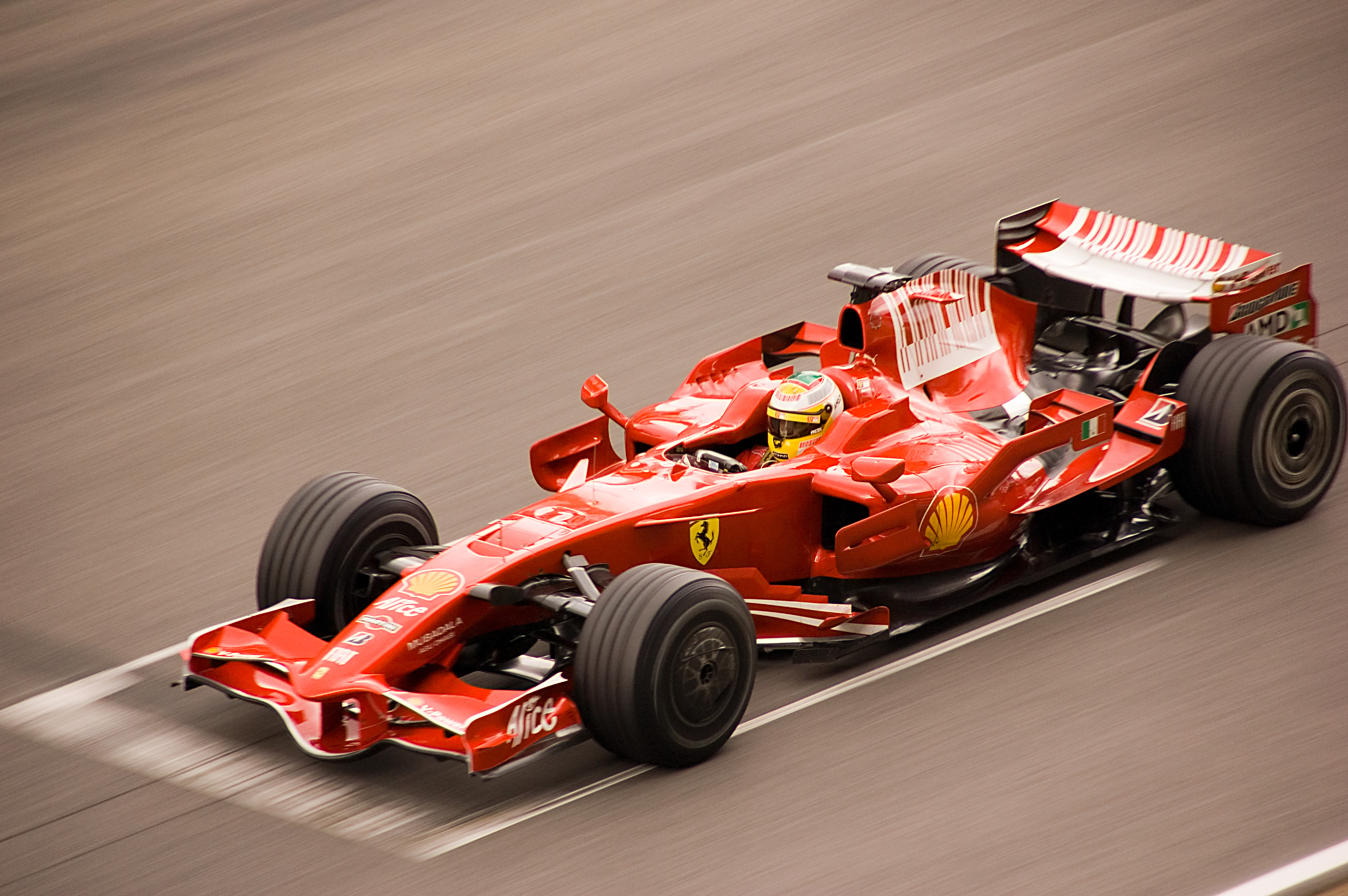
- Luca Badoer testing the F2008 at Circuit de Barcelona-Catalunya
- Category: Formula One
- Constructor: Scuderia Ferrari
- Designers: Mario Almondo (Executive Technical Director); Aldo Costa (Technical Director); Nikolas Tombazis (Chief Designer); Marco Fainello (Head of Vehicle Performance); Tiziano Battistini (Head of Chassis Design); Simone Resta (Head of R&D); John Iley (Head of Aerodynamics); Marco de Luca (Chief Aerodynamicist); Gilles Simon (Engine Technical Director); Lorenzo Sassi (Engine Chief Designer)
- Predecessor: F2007
- Successor: F60

Technical specifications
- Chassis: carbon-fibre and honeycomb composite monocoque
- Suspension (front): Independent suspension, pushrod activated torsion springs
- Suspension (rear): As front
- Engine: Ferrari Tipo 056-2008 2398cc V8 (90°) naturally-aspirated mid-engine
- Transmission: Ferrari 7 speeds + reverse Semiautomatic sequential, electronically controlled, longitudinal gearbox, quick-shift Limited-slip differential
- Power: 785 hp @ 19,000 rpm
- Weight: 605 kg (1,333.8 lb) (including driver)
- Fuel: Shell V-Power ULG 64 Fuel; Shell SL-1098 Lubricant
- Tyres: Bridgestone; BBS Wheels (front and rear): 13"

Competition history
- Notable entrants: Scuderia Ferrari
- Notable drivers: 1. (Finland) Kimi Räikkönen; 2. (Brazil) Felipe Massa
- Debut: 2008 Australian Grand Prix
- First win: 2008 Malaysian Grand Prix
- Last win: 2008 Brazilian Grand Prix
- Last event: 2008 Brazilian Grand Prix
Races	Wins	Podiums	Poles	F/Laps
18	8	19	8	13
- Constructors' Championships: 1 (2008)
- Drivers' Championships: 0

The Ferrari F2008 is a Formula One motor racing car that was constructed by Scuderia Ferrari to compete in the 2008 Formula One World Championship. The car was driven by 2007 World Champion Kimi Räikkönen and Felipe Massa, who both remained with the team for a second and third season, respectively.

As of the 2026 season, the F2008 remains the most recent Ferrari Formula 1 car to win the World Constructors' Championship.

== Design ==
The chassis was designed by Aldo Costa, Simone Resta, Tiziano Battistini, Marco Fainello, John Iley and Marco de Luca with Mario Almondo playing a vital role in leading the production of the car as the team's Executive Technical Director and with Gilles Simon in charge of the engine and electronics division assisted by Lorenzo Sassi (engine design and development) and Mattia Binotto (engine operations).

It features a new standard Electronic Control Unit (ECU), which is the electronic system that controls all the cars, produced by McLaren Electronic Systems. This was included to comply with the new regulations. The ECU also removes most of the driver aids used in previous seasons, including traction control, engine braking, and electronically assisted starting system. It also makes the management of the differential, engine, and gear changes easier.

The car also weighs more than last season's F2007 chassis due to rule changes which include the gearbox which has to be used for four consecutive races, higher side protection around the driver's helmet, etc.

From the Hungarian Grand Prix onwards, both cars had a shark fin attached to the engine cover.

== Launch ==
The car was unveiled to the public on January 6, 2008. World champion Kimi Räikkönen gave the car its first shakedown at Ferrari's Fiorano test track on January 7, 2008.

== Sponsorship and livery ==
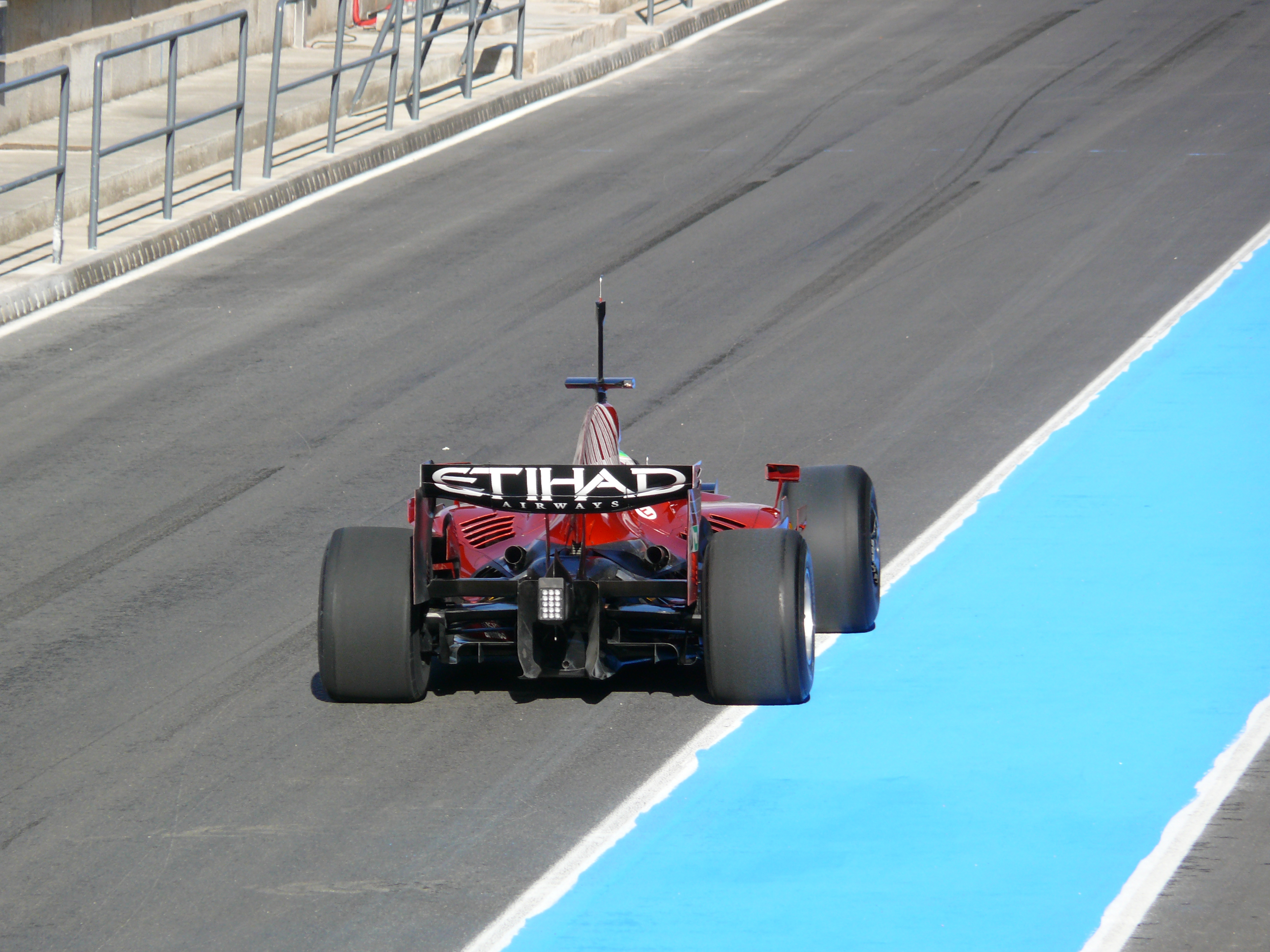
Etihad Airways logo shown on the rear wing of the F2008 during the pre-season testing in the Algarve International Circuit

Like its predecessor, the F2008 was painted all red. The team's principal sponsor is Philip Morris, the parent company of Marlboro. Ferrari was the only team to have a cigarette brand as its main sponsor in 2008, despite the tobacco advertising ban. Although Ferrari could have used the Marlboro logos in Bahrain, Monaco, and China, Ferrari did not use the lettering in these races either. So it happened that throughout the season the brand name was indicated by a bar code and was not seen in any race. Etihad Airways joined as a new sponsor and advertised on the back of the rear wing.

Martini returned for its third and final year with the team. The logo was blocked out in France due to alcohol advertising being outlawed.

== Incidents and accidents ==
- In the 2008 Australian Grand Prix, Felipe Massa suffered nose cone and front wing damage after an incident with David Coulthard; Kimi Räikkönen's engine failed at the end of the race, forcing him to retire.
- In the 2008 Malaysian Grand Prix, Massa spun in the first sector, forcing him to retire.
- In the 2008 Monaco Grand Prix, Räikkönen lost his front wing after sliding into the back of Adrian Sutil at the Nouvelle chicane.
- In the 2008 Canadian Grand Prix, Räikkönen lost his rear wing in the pit lane, after Lewis Hamilton collided with him while the red light still on.
- In the 2008 Hungarian Grand Prix, Massa's engine failed without warning, forcing him to retire from the lead with three laps remaining.
- In the 2008 European Grand Prix, Räikkönen was unsafely released from his pit box with the fuel hose still attached. His engine failed several laps later, forcing him to retire.
- In the 2008 Belgian Grand Prix, Räikkönen suffered front wing damage after running wide then spinning before the chicane.
- In the 2008 Singapore Grand Prix, Massa was unsafely released from his pit box with the fuel hose still attached; Räikkönen suffered a suspension problem then hit the wall in the kerbs.
- In the 2008 Japanese Grand Prix, Massa collided with Hamilton on the second lap.

== Ferrari F2008K ==
On November 11, 2008, on the Fiorano track, Ferrari carried out a test session with Räikkönen, Massa and Badoer, who were driving an F2008 equipped with an SREC, with the aim of introducing this technology on the Ferrari F60 from 2009.

== Other appearances ==
Mika Salo drove an F2008 at the Suzuka Circuit at the Ferrari Racing Days event in March 2012.

== Gallery ==
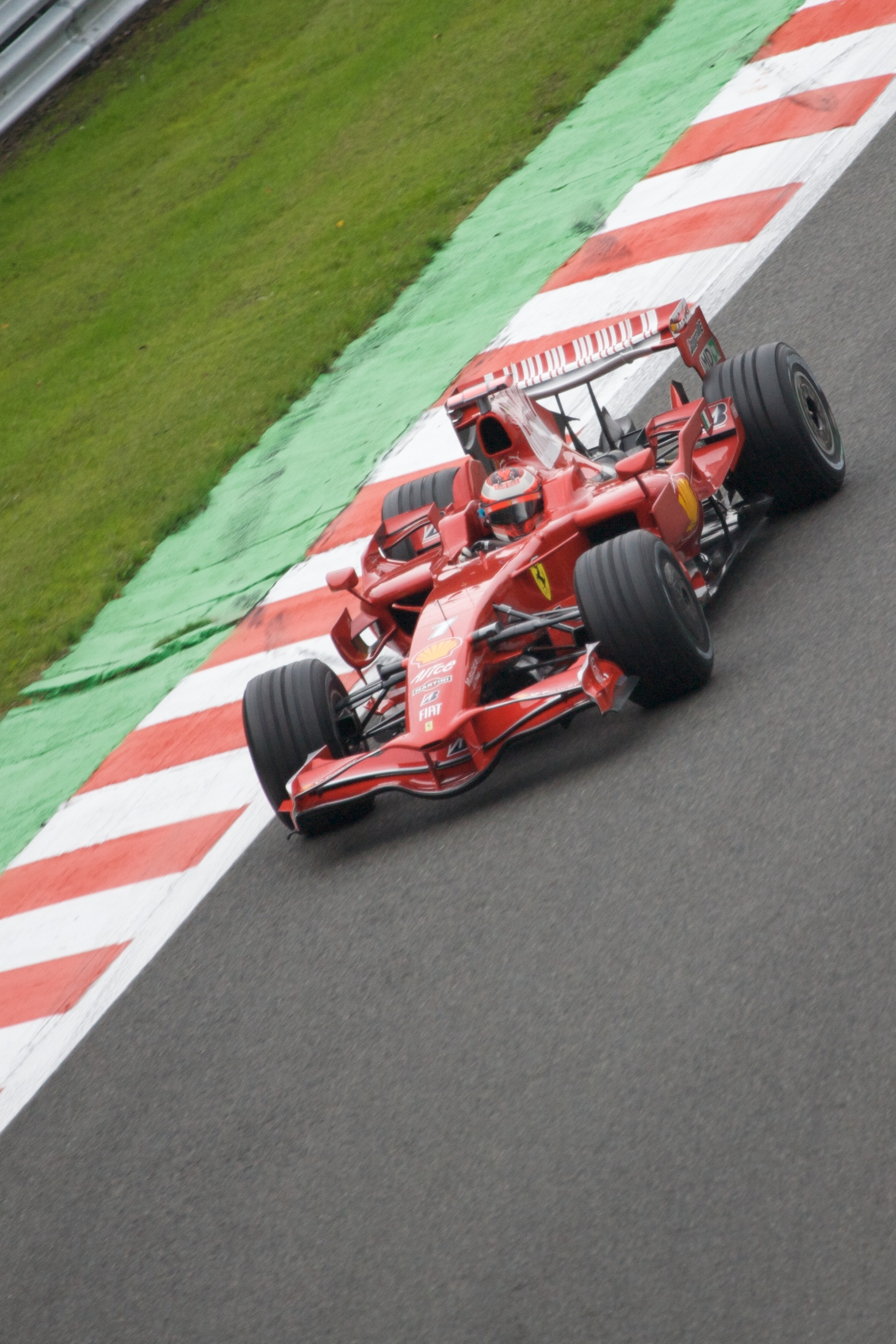
Kimi Räikkönen driving the F2008 at the 2008 Belgian Grand Prix.

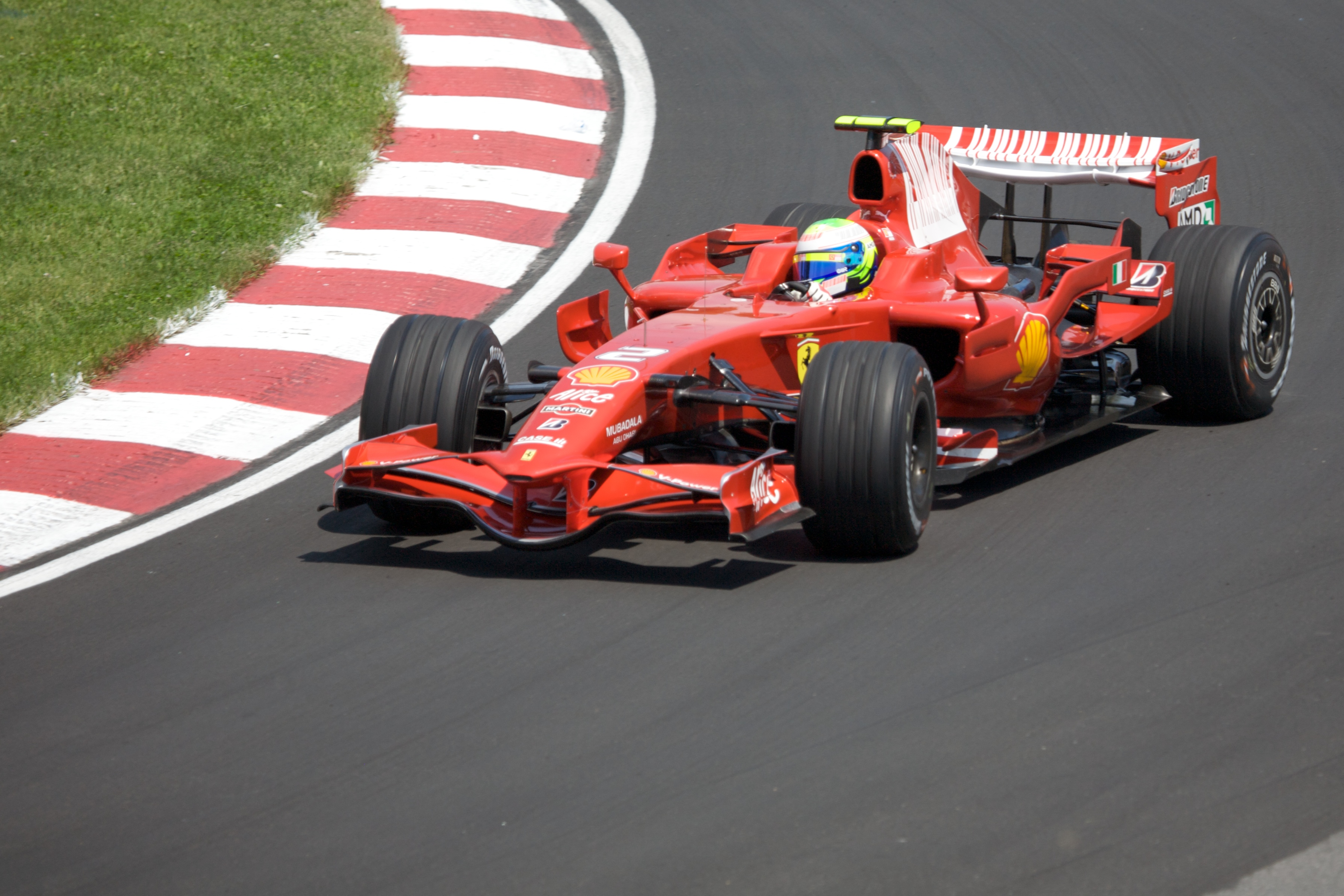
Felipe Massa driving for Ferrari at the 2008 Canadian GP.

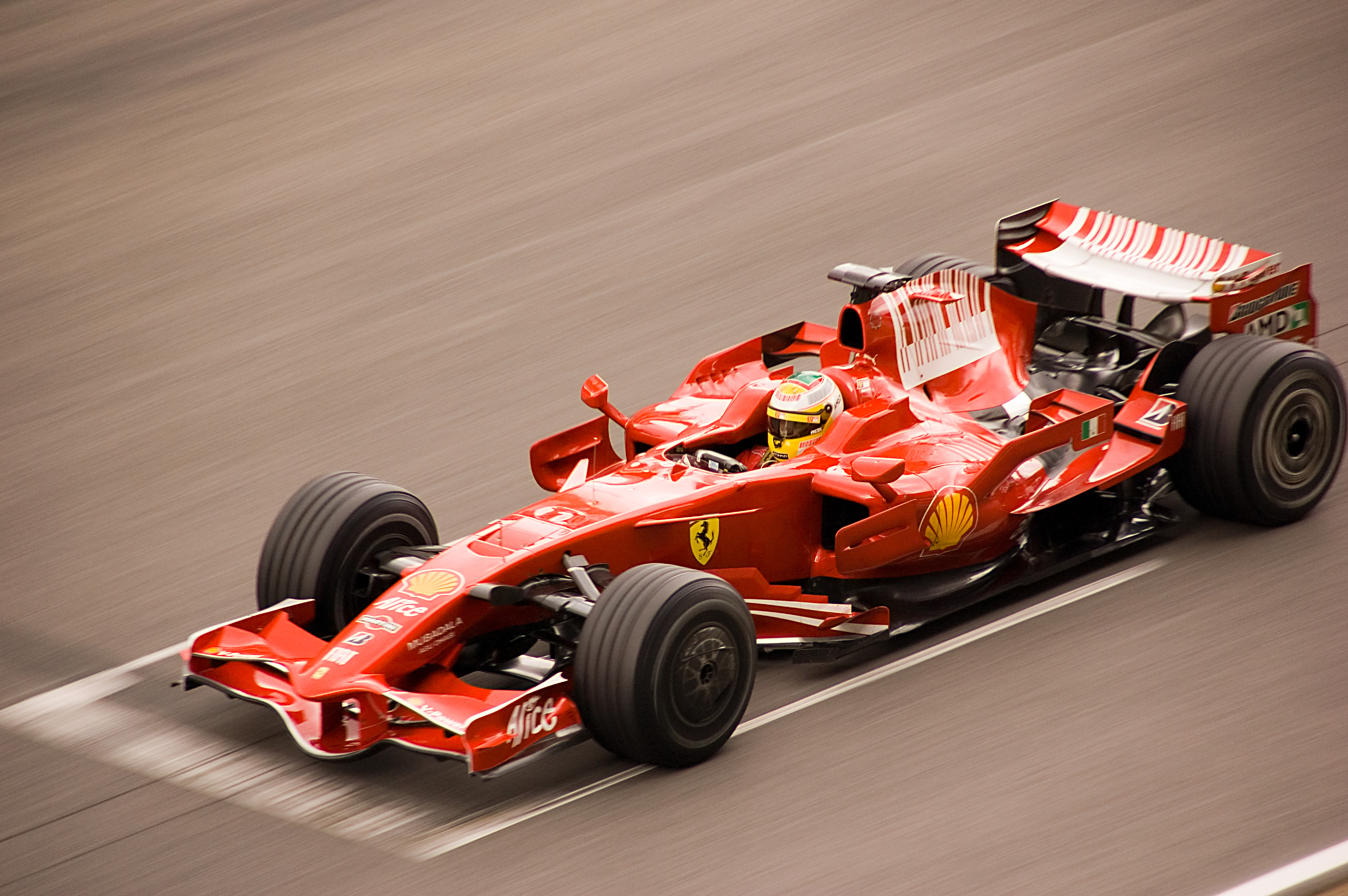
Luca Badoer testing the F2008. The variant front-nosecone has a conduit for air to flow through from bottom to up in the nose.

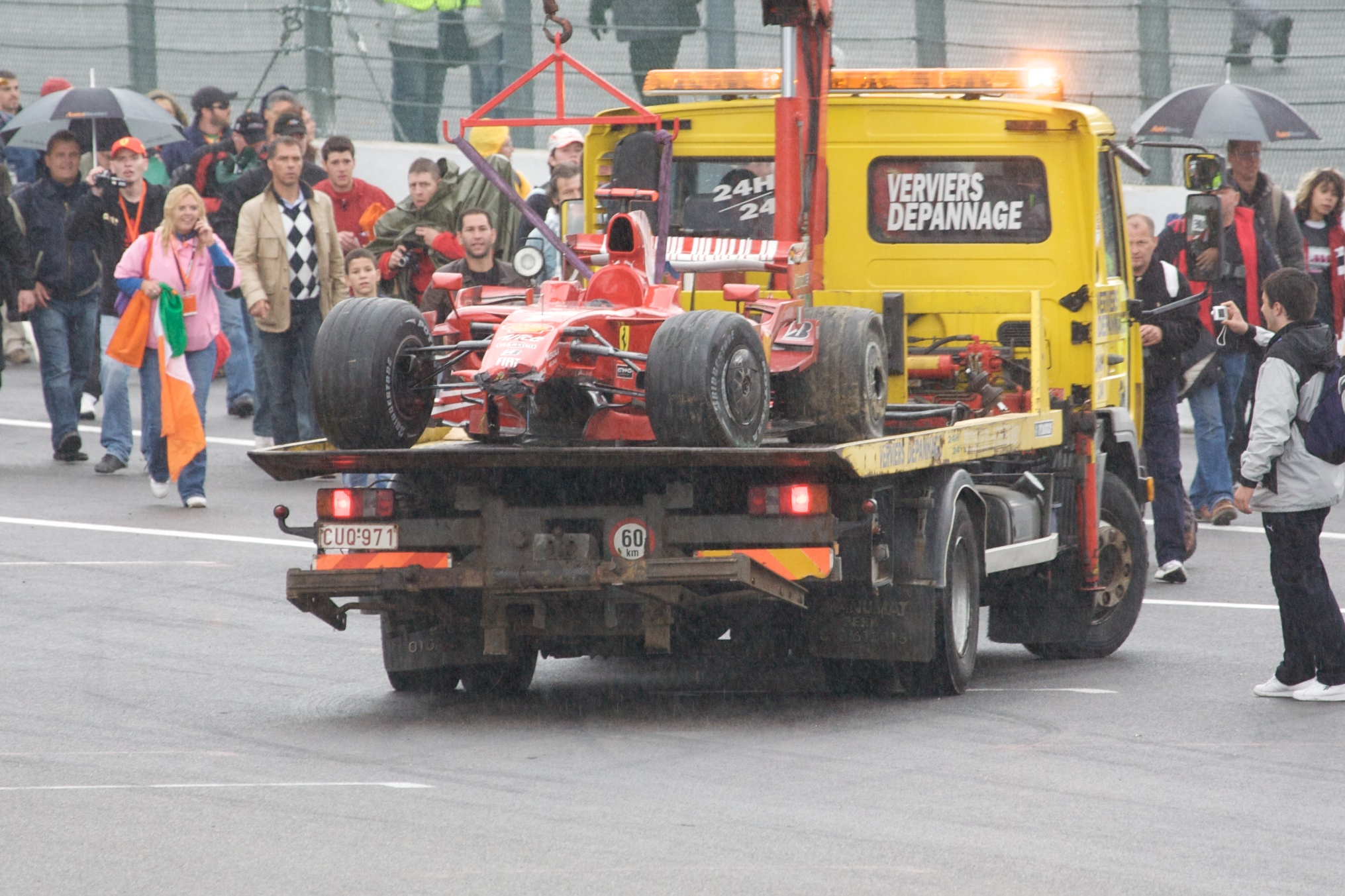
Räikkönen's damaged F2008 is brought back to the pits after the Finn crashed with two laps to go in the 2008 Belgian GP.

== Complete Formula One results ==
(key) (results in bold indicate pole position; results in italics indicate fastest lap)

Year	Team	Engine	Tyres	Drivers	1	2	3	4	5	6	7	8	9	10	11	12	13	14	15	16	17	18	Points	WCC
2008	Scuderia Ferrari Marlboro	Ferrari 056 2.4 V8	**B**		AUS	MAL	BHR	ESP	TUR	MON	CAN	FRA	GBR	GER	HUN	EUR	BEL	ITA	SIN	JPN	CHN	BRA	**172**	**1st**
2008	Scuderia Ferrari Marlboro	Ferrari 056 2.4 V8	**B**	(Finland) Kimi Räikkönen	8^{†}	1	2	**1**	3	9	Ret	**2**	4	6	3	Ret	18^{†}	9	15^{†}	3	3	3	**172**	**1st**
2008	Scuderia Ferrari Marlboro	Ferrari 056 2.4 V8	**B**	(Brazil) Felipe Massa	Ret	**Ret**	1	2	**1**	**3**	5	1	13	3	17^{†}	**1**	1	6	**13**	7	2	**1**	**172**	**1st**

^{†} Driver did not finish the Grand Prix but was classified as he completed over 90% of the race distance.

Räikkönen's fastest lap at the Circuit de Barcelona-Catalunya remained the lap record until it was broken by Lewis Hamilton during the 2018 Spanish Grand Prix.
