= Ferrari F10 =

2010 Formula One racing car

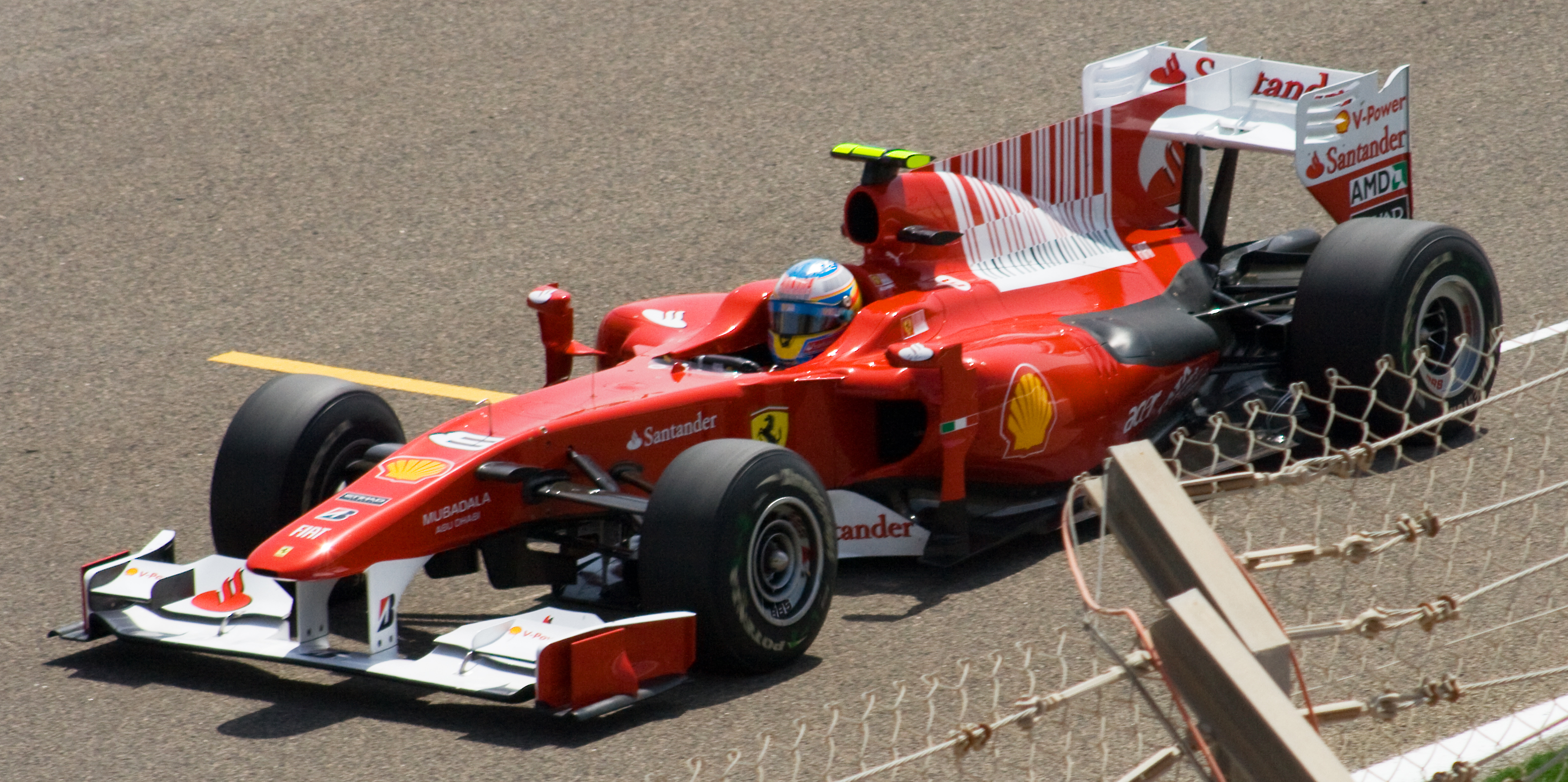
- Fernando Alonso driving the F10 at the Bahrain Grand Prix
- Category: Formula One
- Constructor: Scuderia Ferrari
- Designers: Aldo Costa (Technical Director); Nikolas Tombazis (Chief Designer); Marco Fainello (Head of Vehicle Engineering); Tiziano Battistini (Head of Chassis Design); Simone Resta (Head of R&D); Marco de Luca (Head of Aerodynamics); Nicolas Hennel (Chief Aerodynamicist); Luca Marmorini (Engine and Electronics Director); Lorenzo Sassi (Engine Chief Designer)
- Predecessor: Ferrari F60
- Successor: Ferrari 150º Italia

Technical specifications
- Chassis: carbon-fibre and honeycomb composite monocoque
- Suspension (front): Independent suspension, pushrod activated torsion springs
- Suspension (rear): as front
- Engine: Ferrari Tipo 056-2010 2.4 L (146 cu in) (750 horsepower) V8 (90°) Naturally aspirated, 18,000 RPM limited mid-mounted at a 3.5° angle
- Transmission: Ferrari 7 speeds + reverse Semi-automatic sequential, electronically controlled, longitudinal gearbox, quick-shift Limited-slip differential
- Weight: 620 kg (1,366.9 lb) (including driver, water and lubricant)
- Fuel: Shell V-Power ULG 66L/2 Fuel; Shell Helix Ultra Lubricant
- Tyres: Bridgestone; BBS Wheels (front and rear): 13"

Competition history
- Notable entrants: Scuderia Ferrari
- Notable drivers: 7. (Brazil) Felipe Massa; 8. (Spain) Fernando Alonso
- Debut: 2010 Bahrain Grand Prix
- First win: 2010 Bahrain Grand Prix
- Last win: 2010 Korean Grand Prix
- Last event: 2010 Abu Dhabi Grand Prix
Races	Wins	Podiums	Poles	F/Laps
19	5	15	2	5

The Ferrari F10 is a Formula One motor racing car used by Ferrari to compete in the 2010 Formula One season. The chassis was designed by Aldo Costa, Nikolas Tombazis and Marco de Luca with Luca Marmorini leading the engine and electronics design.

The car was unveiled in Maranello, Italy on 28 January 2010.

== Launch ==
The F10, the 56th single-seater car produced by Ferrari to compete in Formula One, was launched in Maranello, and online, on 28 January 2010. Felipe Massa was due to undertake the car's first shakedown later the same day at the Fiorano Circuit, but due to inclement weather in the area, this was postponed to the following day. However, the weather conditions did not improve and thus the car's first run was at the first group test at Circuit Ricardo Tormo in Valencia on 1 February. On 20 February, Fernando Alonso declared that the F10 was the best car he had ever driven, and that its true pace was being hidden from its rivals.

== Livery ==
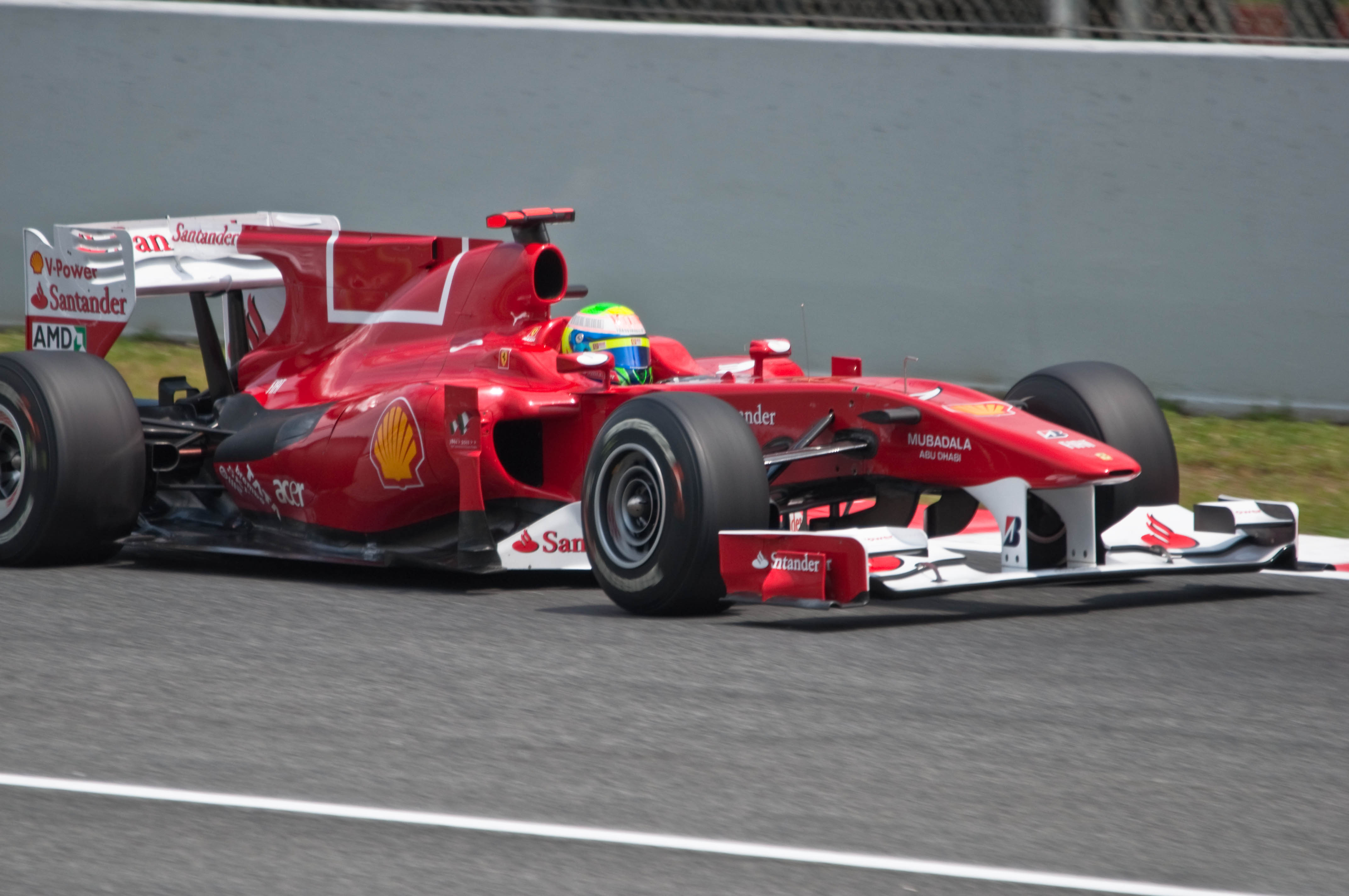
The revised livery on the F10 featuring a white rectangle.

Before the Spanish Grand Prix, Ferrari changed the livery on the F10's engine cover after the team was accused of promoting Marlboro cigarettes with its previous design. Ferrari deleted the barcode and replaced it with a white rectangle on a red background. At the Turkish Grand Prix, Ferrari celebrated their 800th Grand Prix and their cars carried a logo celebrating the achievement on their engine covers.

== Racing history ==
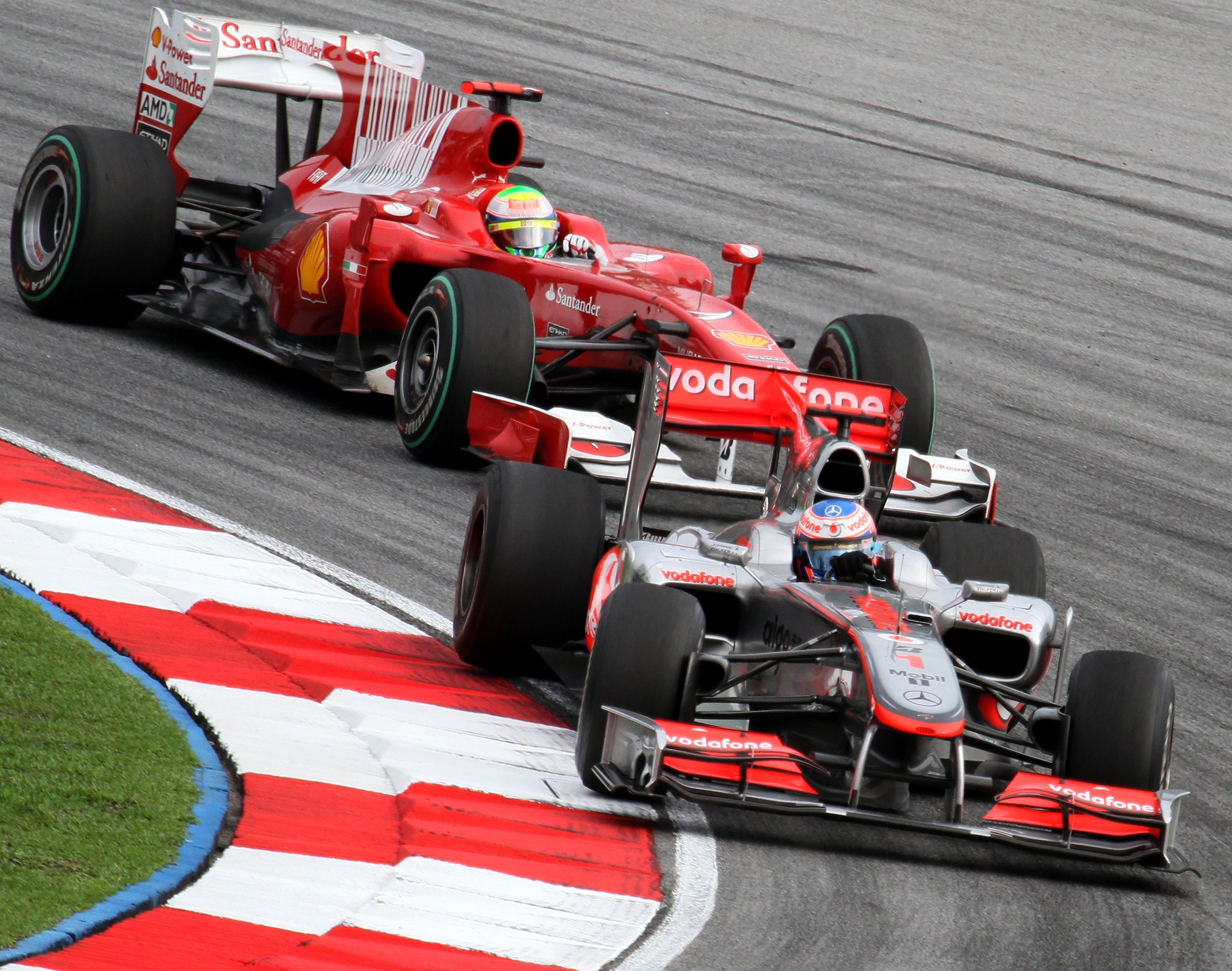
Massa battling over seventh place with Jenson Button at the Malaysian Grand Prix after starting from 21st position.

The F10 proved immediately more competitive than its predecessor, with Felipe Massa and Fernando Alonso picking up 2nd and 3rd respectively in qualifying at the Bahrain Grand Prix. Fernando Alonso won the race with Felipe Massa finishing second.

At the Australian Grand Prix, Alonso spun at the first corner after contact with Jenson Button. This dropped Alonso to the back of the field, but he fought his way up through the field throughout the race to eventually finish in fourth, just behind his team-mate Massa who finished third.

At the Malaysian Grand Prix, both Alonso and Massa as well as McLaren's Lewis Hamilton failed to make it through to the second qualifying session after late entries into an increasingly wet session. Both Ferrari drivers fought their way up through the field. Alonso suffered from a downshift problem which eventually resulted in an engine failure just two laps from the finish. Despite not completing the full race distance, he was classified in thirteenth. Massa finished seventh after passing Button in the late stages of the race.

In China, Alonso qualified third while Massa qualified seventh. Alonso jumped the start which resulted in a drive-through penalty and both of them made counter-productive pitstops onto intermediate tyres which dropped them to over 50 seconds behind race-leader at the time Nico Rosberg. Alonso passed Massa into the pitlane entry which resulted in Massa having to wait behind Alonso while his team-mate was serviced.

A safety car caused by Jaime Alguersuari colliding with another car allowed the rest of the field, including Alonso and Massa to catch the leaders. With a few laps to go, Alonso passed Robert Kubica to gain fourth but couldn't pass Rosberg for third and he duly finished fourth after another spectacular charge for the third consecutive race. Massa on the other hand struggled in the later part of the race and finished ninth. Ferrari have openly admitted that they have not achieved what they were capable of, having been overtaken by McLaren for first in the Constructors' Championship.

An F-duct system was introduced in the car for Spain. Initially introduced by McLaren on the MP4-25, the F-duct is an aerodynamic aid which causes the rear wing to enter a stalled state at high speed, reducing aerodynamic drag and increasing straight line speed. Unlike the system on the MP4-25, the F10 uses a pad on the drivers left hand to block the airflow.

At the European Grand Prix, Ferrari introduced the blown diffuser, a concept first introduced by the Red Bull Racing team. Ferrari repositioned the exhaust between the rear upper and lower wishbones, beefed up the bodywork and rear upper and lower wishbone assemblies to handle the temperatures and repositioned the rear brake ducts.

For the German Grand Prix, Bridgestone announced its intentions to increase the difference between its tyre compounds, meaning that the teams have to deal with the extremes in the rubber compounds.

At the Belgian Grand Prix, Ferrari introduced an improved double diffuser layout and Red Bull Racing inspired rear wing on Felipe Massa's car.

At the Italian Grand Prix, Ferrari ran revised front and rear wings on both the cars as part of the team's low-downforce package. It turned out that these minor changes suited this car, especially at Monza and Alonso took pole position on Saturday. At the start of the race, Button overtook Alonso, but better strategy contributed to Alonso taking the lead again and winning the race, with team-mate Felipe Massa finishing 3rd, thus having both Ferraris on the podium.

At the Singapore Grand Prix, which is widely regarded as one of Alonso's best drives, he took pole again after Sebastian Vettel made a mistake in Q3. On a very narrow track with almost no opportunities of passing the driver ahead, Alonso drove calmly, led every lap, set fastest lap and won the race.

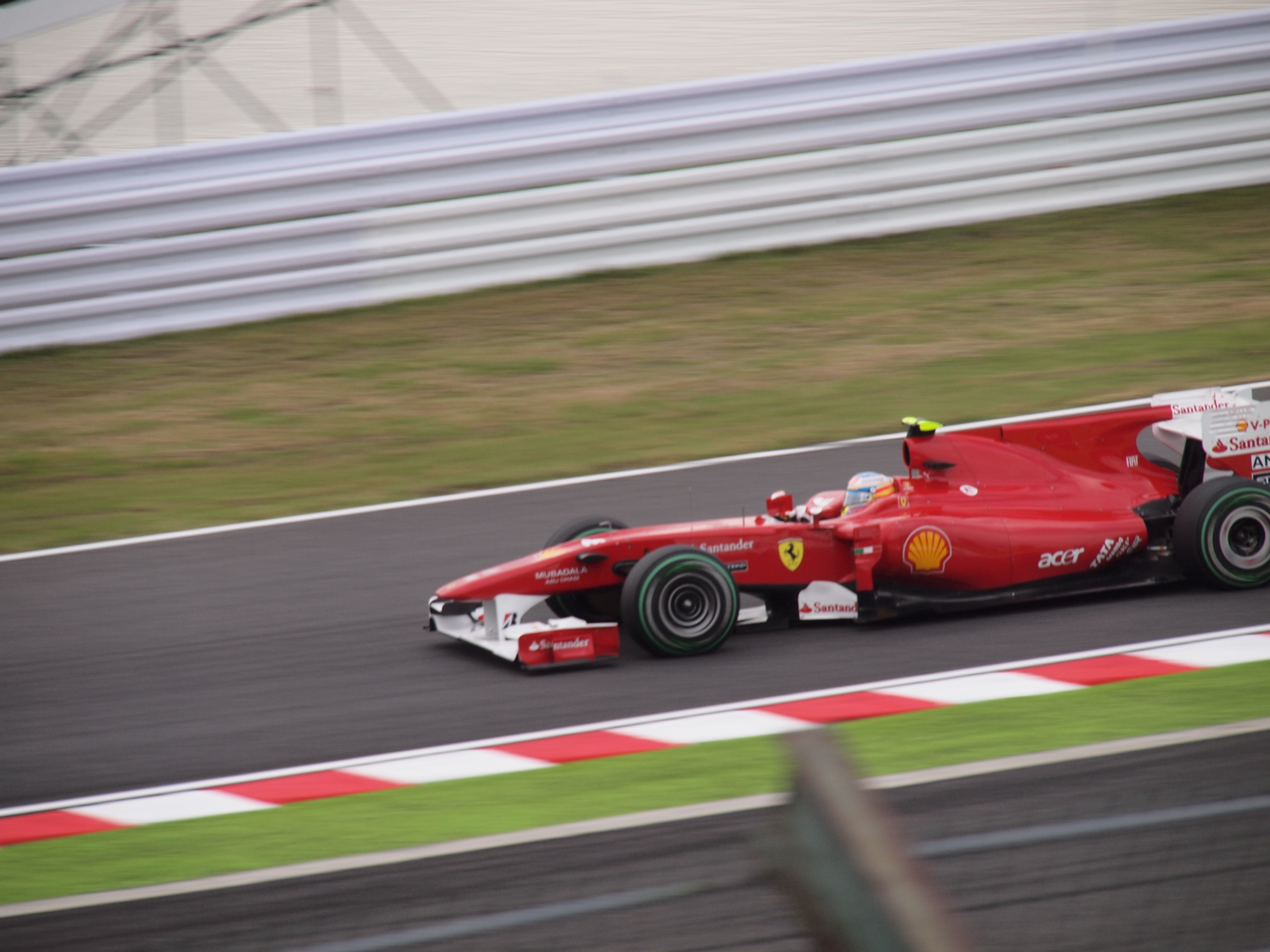
Alonso during the Japanese Grand Prix.

At the next race in Japan, the track suited Red Bull so neither Alonso nor Massa had a chance of scoring better than Alonso's 3rd position at the end of the race.

In Yeongam, Korea, the race was full of excitement, but Vettel suffered an engine failure which allowed Alonso to win the race. Massa finished 3rd.

At the next race in Brazil, the track again suited the very aerodynamic cars of Red Bull, seeing them score a one-two finish, while Alonso finished 3rd.

At the last race at Abu Dhabi, Alonso only needed 2nd to win the championship, and just 4th if Vettel was to win the race. Despite Vettel taking pole position, it all started well with Alonso taking 3rd in qualifying, but in the race Ferrari chose the wrong strategy when they didn't call Alonso into the pits after the Safety Car had been deployed and that soon put him in a bad position. He found himself in 7th and had to fight for places but despite all Alonso's efforts, the Ferrari F10 with a reduced horsepower engine (this was the 5th consecutive event for the engine due to other engines failures and problems in the first part of the season) was unable to pass Petrov (who, with the Renault engine had a much higher top speed than Alonso) and the Spaniard ultimately missed the chance of winning the championship and finished it in 2nd.

== Complete Formula One results ==
(key) (results in bold indicate pole position; results in italics indicate fastest lap)

Year	Entrant	Engine	Tyres	Drivers	1	2	3	4	5	6	7	8	9	10	11	12	13	14	15	16	17	18	19	Points	WCC
2010	Scuderia Ferrari Marlboro	Ferrari 056 V8	**B**		BHR	AUS	MAL	CHN	ESP	MON	TUR	CAN	EUR	GBR	GER	HUN	BEL	ITA	SIN	JPN	KOR	BRA	ABU	**396**	**3rd**
2010	Scuderia Ferrari Marlboro	Ferrari 056 V8	**B**	(Brazil) Felipe Massa	2	3	7	9	6	4	7	15	11	15	2	4	4	3	8	Ret	3	15	10	**396**	**3rd**
2010	Scuderia Ferrari Marlboro	Ferrari 056 V8	**B**	(Spain) Fernando Alonso	1	4	13^{†}	4	2	6	8	3	8	14	1	2	Ret	**1**	**1**	3	1	3	7	**396**	**3rd**

== Other ==
Like the Ferrari F2007, the F10 is featured in Gran Turismo 5. It has also been featured in F1 2010 and Ferrari Virtual Academy. In 2019, as part of Codemasters' celebration of their 10th year making the F1 games, in F1 2019, the F10 is featured in the game's Anniversary Edition DLC along with the McLaren MP4-25, and is available for free with the game in the subsequent F1 2020.
