= F2008 =

F2008 may refer to:

- Ferrari F2008, a Formula One car
- Fortran, a programming language
