= Ferrari 150º Italia =

Formula One racing car

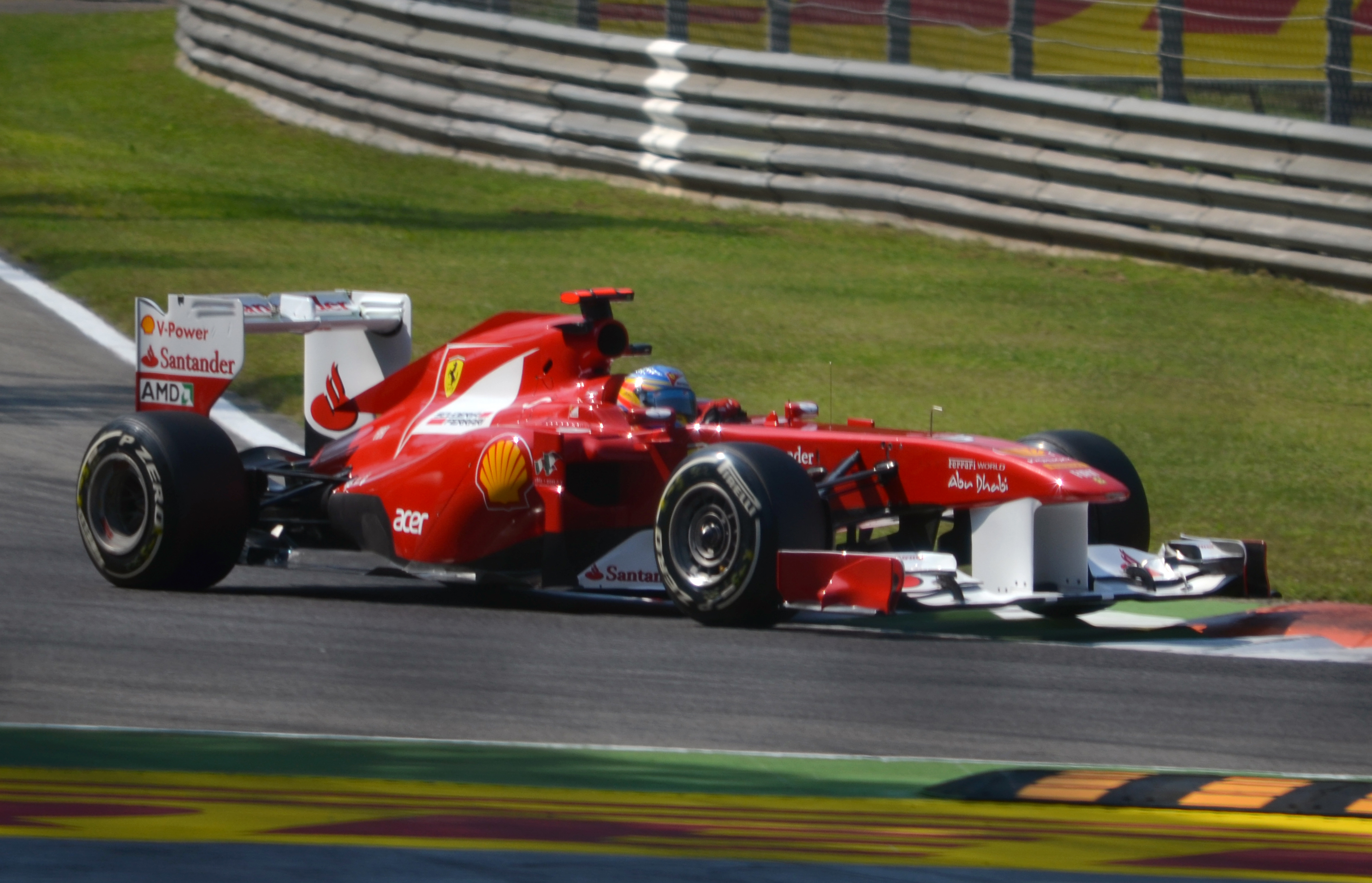
- Fernando Alonso driving the 150º Italia during the Italian Grand Prix
- Category: Formula One
- Constructor: Scuderia Ferrari
- Designers: Aldo Costa (Technical Director); Pat Fry (Deputy Technical Director); Nikolas Tombazis (Chief Designer); Marco Fainello (Head of Vehicle Engineering); Tiziano Battistini (Head of Chassis Design); Simone Resta (Head of R&D); Marco de Luca (Head of Aerodynamics); Simone Fenili (Chief Aerodynamicist); Luca Marmorini (Engine and Electronics Director); Guido di Paola (Engine Chief Designer)
- Predecessor: Ferrari F10
- Successor: Ferrari F2012

Technical specifications
- Chassis: carbon-fibre and honeycomb composite monocoque
- Suspension (front): Independent suspension, pushrod activated torsion springs
- Suspension (rear): as front
- Engine: Ferrari Tipo 056-2011 2,398 cc (146 cu in) V8 (90°) Naturally aspirated, 18,000 RPM limited with KERS, mid-mounted
- Transmission: Ferrari 7 speeds + reverse Semi-automatic sequential, electronically controlled, longitudinal gearbox, quick-shift Limited-slip differential
- Weight: 640 kg (1,411.0 lb) (including driver, water and lubricant)
- Fuel: Shell V-Power ULG 66L/2
- Lubricants: Shell Helix Ultra
- Tyres: Pirelli P Zero; BBS Wheels (front and rear): 13"

Competition history
- Notable entrants: Scuderia Ferrari Marlboro (Rounds 1-8); Scuderia Ferrari (Rounds 9-19)
- Notable drivers: 5. (Spain) Fernando Alonso; 6. (Brazil) Felipe Massa
- Debut: 2011 Australian Grand Prix
- First win: 2011 British Grand Prix
- Last win: 2011 British Grand Prix
- Last event: 2011 Brazilian Grand Prix
Races	Wins	Podiums	Poles	F/Laps
19	1	10	0	3

The Ferrari 150º Italia, formerly known as the Ferrari F150, was a Formula One car used by Ferrari to compete in the 2011 Formula One season. The chassis was designed by Aldo Costa, Pat Fry, Nikolas Tombazis and Marco de Luca with Luca Marmorini leading the engine and electronics design. It was launched at Ferrari's headquarters in Maranello, Italy on 28 January 2011, one year to the day after the launch of its predecessor, the Ferrari F10. It was driven by 2005 and 2006 World Champion Fernando Alonso, and 2008 championship runner up Felipe Massa.

The 150º Italia was the first Ferrari Formula One car to utilize Pirelli tyres since the Ferrari D50 in 1956.

== Name ==
The car's chassis designation was chosen to celebrate the 150th anniversary of the unification of Italy. This was seen by some pundits as a political move by Ferrari president Luca di Montezemolo, who founded the Future Italy think tank.

=== Naming dispute ===
In February 2011, Ford declared its intention to sue Ferrari over the use of the F150 name, to which Ford owns a trademark. In response, Ferrari began to refer to the car as the "F150th Italia", claiming the original F150 moniker was simply an abbreviation. On March 3, Ferrari announced that the name had again been tweaked to "Ferrari 150º Italia" (the 150º pronounced as the Italian ordinal centocinquantesimo), and that Ford had withdrawn its legal challenge.

== Season summary ==
When the season began in Australia, many were surprised by Ferrari's noticeable lack of pace, particularly in qualifying. Alonso and Massa were 1.4 and 2.0 seconds slower than polesitter Sebastian Vettel in his Red Bull RB7, respectively. In the race however, the Ferraris certainly seemed to have decent pace, but their finishing results were still substantially hampered by their poor grid positions, with Alonso finishing 4th and Massa 7th. Their lack of pace continued to hinder their results in both Malaysia and China and after three races, they remain without a podium position and sit third in the Constructor's Championship, already 55 points down on leaders Red Bull. Turkey saw a change in pace for Ferrari, as they were finally able to keep pace with Red Bull. After starting from fifth, Alonso managed to make his way up to second, before being passed by Mark Webber on the 51st lap. His third-place finish was Ferrari's first podium of the season. Massa, meanwhile, started from tenth place, after mechanical problems prevented him from setting a time in the third qualifying session. Although he managed to get as high up as sixth place, two botched pit stops meant he could only finish 11th, behind Kamui Kobayashi and outside the points.

In Spain, Alonso qualified 4th but at the start of the race managed to pass all three drivers ahead and take the lead. But Ferrari again showed a lack of pace and after two rounds of pit stops Alonso found himself behind Mark Webber, who at the time was third. When Alonso switched to hard tyres, the situation became even worse and he was soon overtaken by Jenson Button and was eventually even lapped by race winner Sebastian Vettel, thus finishing in fifth. Aldo Costa, Technical Director, was fired after this Grand Prix (after 5 Grands Prix out of 19).

In Monaco, Ferrari was unable to do better than 4th in qualifying. Alonso again had a good start, passing Webber for third. After the Safety Car, Alonso, having pitted, found himself some 10 seconds behind leader Vettel, but having new tyres, started to catch Vettel quickly and soon found himself just behind him. Meanwhile, Button, having pitted after Alonso, had tyres in even better shape than the Spaniard, and he too started catching Alonso and Vettel and soon found himself behind Alonso. Alonso would probably have had a great chances to overtake Vettel but Vitaly Petrov and Jaime Alguersuari had an accident which led to the race being suspended. After the restart, the top three drivers managed to hold their places so Alonso finished 2nd.

In Canada, the hard-braking, low-downforce track made the Ferraris show much better pace in qualifying than before with Alonso and Massa taking 2nd and 3rd, respectively, with Alonso just over tenth behind pole sitter Vettel. However, race conditions were bad and after a bunch of pit stops and a delay of the race Alonso was hit by Button and thus had to retire from the race.

Massa took fifth in his home race in Brazil

The race in Valencia saw the ban on engine mapping which prevented some teams, especially Red Bull from running extreme engine mapping in qualifying, and thus prevented them being so dominant in qualifying. In the race however, it didn't change much of the Red Bull's race pace so Vettel got away early, while Alonso had to be satisfied with 2nd, which he got after overtaking Webber.

At the British Grand Prix, the FIA introduced another ban, this time on off-throttle blown diffusers, which had been developed to perfection by the Red Bull and McLaren teams. However, Ferrari had not based their car on this technology, so this rule helped Ferrari in particular, but it had major effect on Red Bull cars, because they had to thank the technology for their extraordinary pace, both in qualifying and race. It turned out to be so, when Alonso, on a track that suited Red Bull more than any other track, qualified 3rd, just two tenths behind pole sitter Vettel, with Massa a further six tenths behind Fernando, putting him in fourth. The race however, didn't start that well with rain falling, thus allowing the McLarens, which in the rain had even better pace than Red Bull, to overtake both Massa and Alonso. Soon the track started to dry and drivers were heading to the pits for soft tyres. Vettel's mechanics had problems during his pit stop, allowing Alonso to pass Vettel. With the track almost completely dried, the Ferrari 150º Italia started to show how good race pace it had, of course, with the aid of the ban on off-throttle blown diffusers. Alonso though, exited the pits behind Hamilton, started attacking him aggressively and passed him after a few laps. Although Alonso was in the lead of the race, he continued to push and drive with no mistakes, increasing the lead over Hamilton at a rate of more than a second per lap. Soon he was leading the race with more than 15 seconds ahead of the rest of the field with nobody driving even close to as fast as him. Alonso went on to win the race, with team-mate Massa finishing 5th although he had major problems because debris from another car struck his car thus changing the car's behaviour.

During the next days, teams agreed to remove the ban on off-throttle blown diffusers. Although it seemed that neither Ferrari nor Sauber would agree because this ban helped them in particular, they didn't want to be the only ones who would insist on keeping the regulations as they were at the moment.

At the German Grand Prix, Alonso qualified 4th. He had a good start, soon passing Vettel for 3rd. He kept that pace and soon found himself not far away from the leaders. Alonso had a better strategy than both Webber and Hamilton and took 1st position at one point, but was soon overtaken by Hamilton because of tyre warm-up problems that the Ferrari 150º Italia had all season long. Alonso managed to keep Webber behind and finished 2nd. Massa finished 5th.

At the Hungarian Grand Prix, Ferrari had a decent pace on super-softs, but Alonso had made a mistake in Q3, which put him in 5th, behind Massa, who qualified 4th. The race started with a wet surface. This meant that all of the drivers started on intermediates. The Ferraris struggled at the start, losing places, but both Alonso and Massa made their way up through the field. Alonso could have had a chance to threaten second placed Vettel, but he spun off and was forced to settle for third. Massa finished 6th.

At the Belgian Grand Prix, mixed conditions in qualifying meant that Massa would start the race from 4th and Alonso from 8th. The start went very well with Alonso taking 5th immediately and Massa moving up to third. As the race progressed, Alonso came closer and passed both Hamilton and team-mate Massa for third. Soon Vettel pitted, and Alonso overtook Rosberg taking the lead at that moment, but when the safety car was deployed, he didn't come to the pits and so had to drive on older tyres than Vettel. Soon he was overtaken by Vettel, and as the race progressed, worse pace on harder tyres meant Alonso would end up losing 2nd to Webber and then 3rd to Button two laps before the end of the race, finishing 4th at the end.

== Sponsorship and livery ==
After a criticism regarding on the subliminal tobacco advertising from the previous season, the barcode was replaced with the team's logo on the engine cover. Despite from this decision were made, Philip Morris International signed a multi-year deal with the team. Santander returned for the second year. Throughout the season, Ferrari celebrated the 150th anniversary of the unification of Italy, with a special logo commemorating the anniversary displayed on the side fins of the car.

In Australia, the team included a Japanese flag on the nosecone due to the Tōhoku earthquake and tsunami.

== Complete Formula One results ==
(key) (results in bold indicate pole position; results in italics indicate fastest lap)

Year	Entrant	Engine	Tyres	Drivers	1	2	3	4	5	6	7	8	9	10	11	12	13	14	15	16	17	18	19	Points	WCC
2011	Scuderia Ferrari Marlboro	Ferrari 056 V8	**P**		AUS	MAL	CHN	TUR	ESP	MON	CAN	EUR	GBR	GER	HUN	BEL	ITA	SIN	JPN	KOR	IND	ABU	BRA	**375**	**3rd**
2011	Scuderia Ferrari Marlboro	Ferrari 056 V8	**P**	Fernando Alonso	4	6	7	3	5	2	Ret	2	1	2	3	4	3	4	2	5	3	2	4	**375**	**3rd**
2011	Scuderia Ferrari Marlboro	Ferrari 056 V8	**P**	Felipe Massa	7	5	6	11	Ret	Ret	6	5	5	5	6	8	6	9	7	6	Ret	5	5	**375**	**3rd**

== Other ==
The Ferrari 150º Italia has been featured in the video games F1 2011, Ferrari Virtual Academy and Test Drive: Ferrari Racing Legends.
