= Lorenzo Sassi =

Italian Formula One engineer

- Born: 10 August 1967 (age 58); Florence, Italy
- Occupation: Engineer
- Employer: Mercedes AMG High Performance Powertrains
- Title: Engineering Director

Lorenzo Sassi (born 10 August 1967) is an Italian Formula One engineer. He is currently the engineering director of Mercedes AMG High Performance Powertrains.

== Career ==
Sassi graduated in mechanical engineering from the University of Florence, where he studied energetics and completed a thesis in collaboration with the Fiat Research Centre focused on computational fluid dynamics (CFD) simulation of internal flow processes in diesel engines. He subsequently undertook a PhD at the University of Perugia, again in partnership with the Fiat Research Centre, carrying out experimental and numerical research into unsteady flow phenomena in intake and exhaust systems.

He began his professional career in 1995 at the Fiat Research Centre as an engine fluid-dynamics specialist, working on advanced simulation and development programmes. After a brief period as a project manager with General Electric in 1997, he joined Scuderia Ferrari in 1998 as head of the engine fluid-dynamics group within the Formula One programme. Sassi served as Head of Engine Reliability from 2002 to 2003, before being appointed Head of Engine Testing (overseeing both performance and reliability) from December 2003 to 2006, during a dominant era for the Scuderia. He became Engine Chief Designer in 2006.

In 2010 he moved to Ferrari's GT division to oversee development of the company's first turbocharged V8 engines for sports-car racing, before returning to the Formula One programme in 2014 as Chief Designer of the power unit. He was responsible for the power units used in the Ferrari SF15-T, Ferrari SF16-H and Ferrari SF70H, playing a key role in Ferrari's significant gains in engine performance during this period.

In 2017 Sassi joined Mercedes AMG High Performance Powertrains in Brixworth, where he worked on hybrid power-unit development and later became Head of the Thermofluids Department. He subsequently served as Chief Engineer for the next-generation power unit programme from 2020 to 2023, before being appointed F1 Engineering Director in 2023, overseeing engineering delivery and development of Mercedes’ contemporary Formula One power-unit projects.
