= John Iley =

British motor racing aerodynamicist

- Born: John Alastair Iley; September 29, 1967 (age 58)
- Education: Imperial College, London; Lanchester Polytechnic
- Occupation: Director of Iley Design
- Known for: Formula One engineer, aerodynamicist and team principal

John Alastair Iley (born 29 September 1967) is a British motor racing aerodynamicist, who was formerly the technical director for the Caterham F1 team.

== Career ==
After graduating from Lanchester Polytechnic, Coventry, while studying at Imperial College, London, he worked on wind tunnel testing and data analysis of a sports prototypes.

Hired by Brun Technics on graduation, he worked on both the EuroBrun F1 team and the 1990 design of the Judd-powered Brun C91 sports car. In 1991 he was hired as aerodynamicist on the Allard J2X-C sports car, and subsequently worked on Indycar development for Newman-Haas, Lola Cars and Swift Engineering.

In 1995 he moved to Formula1 with Jordan Grand Prix as an aerodynamicist, becoming chief aerodynamicist in 1998. In 2002 he followed Mike Gascoyne to Renault F1, and then joined Ferrari in 2004 as chief aerodynamicist.

He joined McLaren Racing in 2010, but was placed on gardening leave in late 2011, ahead of his joining with Gascoyne again at Caterham F1 as performance director in 2012.

Following his career in F1, Iley is the Director of Iley Design.
