= Marco de Luca (engineer) =

Italian motorsport engineer

- Occupation: Engineer
- Employer: Aprilia Racing
- Known for: Aerodynamicist and engineer
- Title: Head of vehicle department

Marco de Luca is an Italian Formula One and motorsport engineer and aerodynamicist. He is currently the head of the Vehicle Department for Aprilia Racing. He previously served as Head of Aerodynamics at Scuderia Ferrari.

== Career ==
De Luca studied engineering at Sapienza University of Rome, after completing a dissertation on the aerodynamic effects of aircraft winglets. He began his professional career outside motorsport as a systems analyst at Procter & Gamble, before moving into motorsport in the early 1990s.

In 1990, De Luca joined the Minardi as an aerodynamicist, where he gained his first experience in Formula One. He later moved to Fondmetal, working as a project leader on their wind tunnel, before joining Benetton Formula in 1998 as a project leader within the aerodynamics department at Enstone.

De Luca joined Scuderia Ferrari in 2000, beginning a long tenure with the Scuderia that coincided with the team’s most successful period. Over the following decade he progressed through the aerodynamics department, serving as aero team leader, senior aerodynamicist and ultimately chief aerodynamicist. During this period he contributed to the development of multiple championship-winning cars and was responsible for the overall aerodynamic concept, wind-tunnel correlation and performance development. From 2009 to 2011, he served as Head of Aerodynamics at Ferrari, leading the aerodynamics department for the Ferrari F10 and Ferrari 150º Italia. He was subsequently reassigned to Ferrari’s GT racing programmes, contributing to the marque’s wider motorsport activities.

After leaving Ferrari, De Luca held senior technical and management roles across the automotive industry, including positions at Lamborghini, Mercedes-AMG’s DTM programme with HWA AG, and McLaren Automotive, where he worked on vehicle-line and motorsport projects. In 2019, De Luca joined Aprilia Racing, where he was appointed Head of Vehicle Department. In this role he oversees the concept, design and integration of the MotoGP chassis and bodywork, including aerodynamics, cooling systems, ergonomics, composite materials and vehicle packaging.
