= Marco Fainello =

Italian engineer

- Born: 12 September 1964 (age 61); Verona, Italy
- Citizenship: Italian
- Education: Polytechnic University of Milan
- Occupation: Engineer
- Employer: Aston Martin F1 Team
- Title: Performance Director

Marco Fainello (born 12 September 1964) is an Italian engineer who currently serves as the Performance Director for Aston Martin in Formula One.

== Early life ==
Born in Verona, Fainello graduated in Mechanical Engineering at Polytechnic University of Milan with a thesis on tyre dynamics.

== Career ==
After graduating, from 1990 to 1994 he was at the Fiat Research Centre. During this time he was involved in projects that concerned vehicle dynamics: his first job was to take care of a model of Ferrari 348. Furthermore, he started a collaboration with Professor Hans B. Pacejka, expert on dynamics of vehicles and tyres. Together they reached important goals in the study of tyre dynamics and after this collaboration Fainello was also known by the nickname "the rubber man".

He also carried on some external projects: he was guest docent for the Vehicle Dynamics course at Dallara Automobili and consultant for the Alfa DTM team. In 1994 the Alfa DTM team with an Alfa Romeo 155 V6 TI and the driver Nicola Larini on board made history at the Nürburgring by winning both races and bringing the Alfa Romeo to win again on the circuit for the first time since Tazio Nuvolari victory in 1935.

=== Formula One ===
In 1995 he joined the Scuderia Ferrari Formula One team. At first, Fainello had the role of "veicolista", the engineer in charge of the set-up on track. But after the first few years as veicolista of the drivers Jean Alesi and Michael Schumacher, in 1997 he became the responsible in chief of the vehicle dynamics and maintained this role until 2004.

When he was in charge, Ferrari collected 6 Formula One World Constructor's Championships and Schumacher won the Formula One Drivers' Championship five times, from 2000 to 2004. These are the golden years of the Ferrari and the team was renamed "the Dream Team" by the press . The members of the Ferrari's "the Dream Team" were:

- Jean Todt – general manager
- Ross Brawn – Technical Director
- Rory Byrne – Chief Designer
- Marco Fainello – Head of Vehicle Dynamics
- Paolo Martinelli – Engine Director
- Stefano Domenicali – Team Manager
- Luca Baldisserri – Head of Track Engineering
- Michael Schumacher – Driver
- Rubens Barrichello – Driver

He worked closely with Bridgestone and its Technical Director Hirohide Hamashima until the 2007 to develop the tyres used by Ferrari, obtaining significant results.

In 2004 Fainello was assigned to the development of the Ferrari simulator, a virtual system that can emulate all the car's functions for carrying out analysis without necessarily having to drive a real car.

Despite other teams like McLaren and Red Bull Racing having initiated the use of simulators well in advance of Ferrari, Fainello was able to recover the time lost creating the first Ferrari simulator inside the Fiat Research Centre.

In the same year, as well as other members of the Ferrari Dream Team, he was appointed Cavaliere al merito della Repubblica Italiana by the President Carlo Azeglio Ciampi.

In the year 2007 and 2008, even though many members of the Dream Team had already left the team, Ferrari won two Formula One World Constructors' Championships and one Formula One Drivers' Championship.

In 2009, as Performance Development Director, he completed the construction of the first Ferrari simulator in the Maranello headquarters.

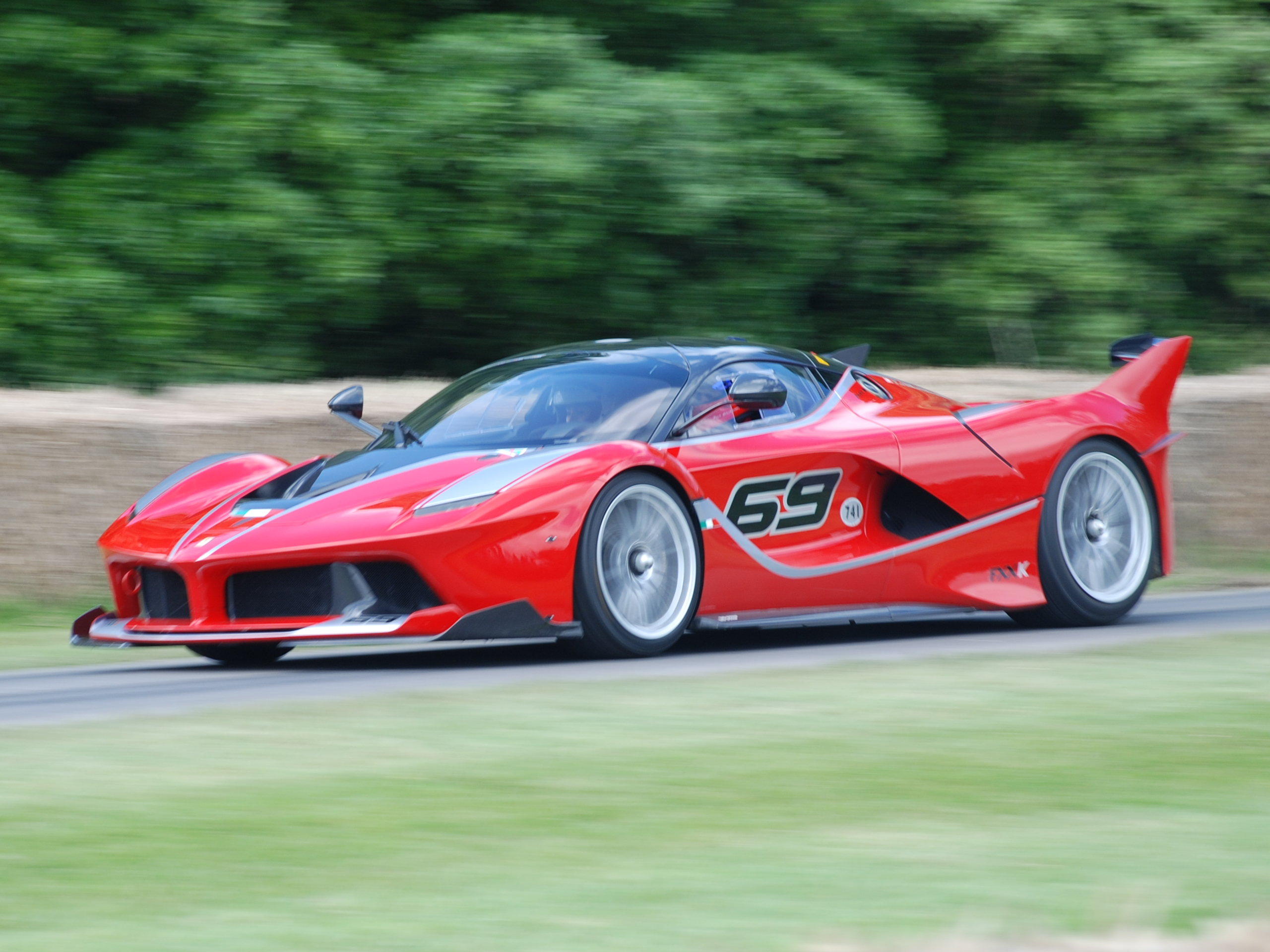
A Ferrari FXX K, for which Fainello was head of development

.

In 2012 he passed to the Road Car Department, as Head of Performance Development for the road cars and responsible of the project of the new driving simulator. In this role he developed the Side Slip Control (SSC), the flagship system of all new Ferrari road cars. In 2014 is the head of the development of the Ferrari FXX-K, the first Ferrari hybrid car based on a heat engine from 850 hp and an electric motor of 187 hp for a total of more than 1030 hp.

In the same years he also worked on the development of the chassis of the Ferrari 458 GTE "Le Mans" and of the Ferrari 488 GT used in the GT WEC championship where Fainello was assigned in 2013 as Head of Ferrari GT Track Car Development.

In the FIA World Endurance Championship he won 3 times the Constructors' World Cup and 2 times the Drivers' Cup.

At the end of 2016 he left Ferrari to join Add-For as Partner and executive director and Danisi Engineering as Chief Technical Officer.

Today, Fainello is contributing his experience to many supercar projects of most known brands, such as Aston Martin.

On 5 November 2025, it was revealed that Fainello returned to Formula One, under the Aston Martin Team as a consultant for their simulator, which was an area for improvement which Team Principal and Managing Technical Partner Adrian Newey had identified.

== Honours ==
- Italy: Cavaliere Ordine al merito della Repubblica Italiana (2004)

== Publications ==
- Ferrari Formula 1 : under the skin of the championship-winning F1-2000, Peter Wright
