= 2004 FIA GT Imola 500 km =

Layout of the Imola Circuit (1995-2006)

The 2004 FIA GT Imola 500 km was the eighth round of the 2004 FIA GT Championship season. It took place at the Autodromo Enzo e Dino Ferrari, Italy, on September 5, 2004.

This race featured the competition debut of the Maserati MC12, with AF Corse entering two cars. The FIA initially refused to homologate of the road versions of the MC12 because the car was wider than the current regulations allow. However, with agreement from other FIA GT teams, the MC12 was allowed to participate in the GT1 class with revised bodywork, a narrower rear wing, and no ability to score championship points.

== Official results ==
Class winners in bold. Cars failing to complete 70% of winner's distance marked as Not Classified (NC).

Pos	Class	No	Team	Drivers	Chassis	Tyre	Laps
Pos	Class	No	Team	Drivers	Engine	Tyre	Laps
1	**GT**	**5**	**(Germany) Vitaphone Racing Team (Germany) Konrad Motorsport**	**(Germany) Michael Bartels (Germany) Uwe Alzen**	**Saleen S7-R**	**P**	**97**
1	**GT**	**5**	**(Germany) Vitaphone Racing Team (Germany) Konrad Motorsport**	**(Germany) Michael Bartels (Germany) Uwe Alzen**	**Ford Windsor 7.0 L V8**	**P**	**97**
2	GT	33	(Italy) AF Corse	(Italy) Andrea Bertolini (Finland) Mika Salo	Maserati MC12 GT1	**P**	97
2	GT	33	(Italy) AF Corse	(Italy) Andrea Bertolini (Finland) Mika Salo	Maserati M144B/2 6.0 L V12	**P**	97
3	GT	34	(Italy) AF Corse	(Italy) Fabrizio de Simone (United Kingdom) Johnny Herbert	Maserati MC12 GT1	**P**	97
3	GT	34	(Italy) AF Corse	(Italy) Fabrizio de Simone (United Kingdom) Johnny Herbert	Maserati M144B/2 6.0 L V12	**P**	97
4	GT	2	(Italy) BMS Scuderia Italia	(Italy) Fabrizio Gollin (Italy) Luca Cappellari	Ferrari 550-GTS Maranello	**MI**	96
4	GT	2	(Italy) BMS Scuderia Italia	(Italy) Fabrizio Gollin (Italy) Luca Cappellari	Ferrari F133A 5.9 L V12	**MI**	96
5	GT	3	(United Kingdom) Care Racing Developments (Italy) BMS Scuderia Italia	(Italy) Stefano Livio (Switzerland) Enzo Calderari (Switzerland) Lilian Bryner	Ferrari 550-GTS Maranello	**MI**	96
5	GT	3	(United Kingdom) Care Racing Developments (Italy) BMS Scuderia Italia	(Italy) Stefano Livio (Switzerland) Enzo Calderari (Switzerland) Lilian Bryner	Ferrari F133A 5.9 L V12	**MI**	96
6	GT	1	(Italy) BMS Scuderia Italia	(Italy) Matteo Bobbi (Switzerland) Gabriele Gardel	Ferrari 550-GTS Maranello	**MI**	95
6	GT	1	(Italy) BMS Scuderia Italia	(Italy) Matteo Bobbi (Switzerland) Gabriele Gardel	Ferrari F133A 5.9 L V12	**MI**	95
7	GT	11	(Italy) G.P.C. Giesse Squadra Corse	(Austria) Philipp Peter (Italy) Fabio Babini	Ferrari 575-GTC Maranello	**P**	95
7	GT	11	(Italy) G.P.C. Giesse Squadra Corse	(Austria) Philipp Peter (Italy) Fabio Babini	Ferrari F133E 6.0 L V12	**P**	95
8	GT	13	(Italy) G.P.C. Giesse Squadra Corse	(Italy) Emanuele Naspetti (Italy) Gianni Morbidelli	Ferrari 575-GTC Maranello	**P**	95
8	GT	13	(Italy) G.P.C. Giesse Squadra Corse	(Italy) Emanuele Naspetti (Italy) Gianni Morbidelli	Ferrari F133E 6.0 L V12	**P**	95
9	**N-GT**	**99**	**(Germany) Freisinger Motorsport**	**(Germany) Lucas Luhr (Germany) Sascha Maassen**	**Porsche 911 GT3-RSR**	**MI**	**94**
9	**N-GT**	**99**	**(Germany) Freisinger Motorsport**	**(Germany) Lucas Luhr (Germany) Sascha Maassen**	**Porsche M96/79 3.6 L Flat-6**	**MI**	**94**
10	GT	17	(Monaco) JMB Racing	(Austria) Karl Wendlinger (Brazil) Jaime Melo	Ferrari 575-GTC Maranello	**MI**	94
10	GT	17	(Monaco) JMB Racing	(Austria) Karl Wendlinger (Brazil) Jaime Melo	Ferrari F133E 6.0 L V12	**MI**	94
11	N-GT	50	(Germany) Yukos Freisinger Motorsport	(France) Emmanuel Collard (Monaco) Stéphane Ortelli	Porsche 911 GT3-RSR	**MI**	93
11	N-GT	50	(Germany) Yukos Freisinger Motorsport	(France) Emmanuel Collard (Monaco) Stéphane Ortelli	Porsche M96/79 3.6 L Flat-6	**MI**	93
12	N-GT	77	(Germany) Yukos Freisinger Motorsport	(Germany) Jörg Bergmeister (Russia) Alexey Vasilyev	Porsche 911 GT3-RSR	**MI**	92
12	N-GT	77	(Germany) Yukos Freisinger Motorsport	(Germany) Jörg Bergmeister (Russia) Alexey Vasilyev	Porsche M96/79 3.6 L Flat-6	**MI**	92
13	GT	7	(United Kingdom) Ray Mallock Ltd.	(United Kingdom) Mike Newton (Brazil) Thomas Erdos	Saleen S7-R	**D**	92
13	GT	7	(United Kingdom) Ray Mallock Ltd.	(United Kingdom) Mike Newton (Brazil) Thomas Erdos	Ford Windsor 7.0 L V8	**D**	92
14	N-GT	87	(Italy) MIK Corse	(Italy) Alessandro Piccolo (Italy) Giovanni Berton	Ferrari 360 Modena GTC	**P**	90
14	N-GT	87	(Italy) MIK Corse	(Italy) Alessandro Piccolo (Italy) Giovanni Berton	Ferrari F131 3.6 L V8	**P**	90
15	GT	19	(Monaco) JMB	(Italy) Matteo Malucelli (France) Antoine Gosse (Netherlands) Peter Kutemann	Ferrari 575-GTC Maranello	**MI**	90
15	GT	19	(Monaco) JMB	(Italy) Matteo Malucelli (France) Antoine Gosse (Netherlands) Peter Kutemann	Ferrari F133E 6.0 L V12	**MI**	90
16	N-GT	59	(Germany) Jens Petersen Racing	(Germany) Jens Petersen (Germany) Oliver Mathai (Germany) Jan-Dirk Lueders	Porsche 911 GT3-RS	**MI**	89
16	N-GT	59	(Germany) Jens Petersen Racing	(Germany) Jens Petersen (Germany) Oliver Mathai (Germany) Jan-Dirk Lueders	Porsche M96/79 3.6 L Flat-6	**MI**	89
17	GT	28	(United Kingdom) Graham Nash Motorsport	(Italy) Paolo Ruberti (Italy) Gabriele Lancieri (Italy) Luca Pirri-Ardizzone	Saleen S7-R	**D**	88
17	GT	28	(United Kingdom) Graham Nash Motorsport	(Italy) Paolo Ruberti (Italy) Gabriele Lancieri (Italy) Luca Pirri-Ardizzone	Ford Windsor 7.0 L V8	**D**	88
18	N-GT	56	(Italy) AB Motorsport	(Italy) Antonio De Castro (Italy) Renato Premoli (Italy) Bruno Barbaro	Porsche 911 GT3-RS	**D**	88
18	N-GT	56	(Italy) AB Motorsport	(Italy) Antonio De Castro (Italy) Renato Premoli (Italy) Bruno Barbaro	Porsche M96/79 3.6 L Flat-6	**D**	88
19	GT	18	(Monaco) JMB Racing	(United Kingdom) Chris Buncombe (Belgium) Bert Longin (Russia) Sergei Zlobin	Ferrari 575-GTC Maranello	**MI**	88
19	GT	18	(Monaco) JMB Racing	(United Kingdom) Chris Buncombe (Belgium) Bert Longin (Russia) Sergei Zlobin	Ferrari F133E 6.0 L V12	**MI**	88
20	N-GT	69	(Germany) Proton Competition	(Germany) Gerold Ried (Germany) Christian Ried	Porsche 911 GT3-RS	**D**	87
20	N-GT	69	(Germany) Proton Competition	(Germany) Gerold Ried (Germany) Christian Ried	Porsche M96/79 3.6 L Flat-6	**D**	87
21	GT	24	(France) DAMS	(Italy) Andrea Piccini (Switzerland) Jean-Denis Délétraz	Lamborghini Murciélago R-GT	**MI**	86
21	GT	24	(France) DAMS	(Italy) Andrea Piccini (Switzerland) Jean-Denis Délétraz	Lamborghini 6.0 L V12	**MI**	86
22	N-GT	57	(Czech Republic) Vonka Racing	(Czech Republic) Jan Vonka (Italy) Marco Panzavuota (Italy) Massimiliano Degiovanni	Porsche 911 GT3-R	**P**	84
22	N-GT	57	(Czech Republic) Vonka Racing	(Czech Republic) Jan Vonka (Italy) Marco Panzavuota (Italy) Massimiliano Degiovanni	Porsche M96/79 3.6 L Flat-6	**P**	84
23	GT	10	(Netherlands) Zwaans GTR Racing Team	(France) Christophe Bouchut (Belgium) Stéphane Lemeret (Belgium) Val Hillebrand	Chrysler Viper GTS-R	**D**	77
23	GT	10	(Netherlands) Zwaans GTR Racing Team	(France) Christophe Bouchut (Belgium) Stéphane Lemeret (Belgium) Val Hillebrand	Chrysler Viper 356-T6 8.0 L V10	**D**	77
24	N-GT	73	(United Kingdom) Cirtek Motorsport	(United Kingdom) Adam Jones (Russia) Nikolai Fomenko	Porsche 911 GT3-RS	**D**	70
24	N-GT	73	(United Kingdom) Cirtek Motorsport	(United Kingdom) Adam Jones (Russia) Nikolai Fomenko	Porsche M96/79 3.6 L Flat-6	**D**	70
25 DNF	GT	35	(Italy) Scuderia Veregra	(Italy) Base Up (Italy) Valerio Scarsellati (Italy) Angelo Lancelotti	Chrysler Viper GTS-R	**P**	45
25 DNF	GT	35	(Italy) Scuderia Veregra	(Italy) Base Up (Italy) Valerio Scarsellati (Italy) Angelo Lancelotti	Chrysler Viper 356-T6 8.0 L V10	**P**	45
26 DNF	GT	4	(Germany) Konrad Motorsport	(Austria) Franz Konrad (Austria) Walter Lechner, Jr. (Switzerland) Toni Seiler	Saleen S7-R	**P**	44
26 DNF	GT	4	(Germany) Konrad Motorsport	(Austria) Franz Konrad (Austria) Walter Lechner, Jr. (Switzerland) Toni Seiler	Ford Windsor 7.0 L V8	**P**	44
27 DNF	GT	26	(France) DAMS	(Italy) Beppe Gabbiani (Bolivia) Filipe Ortiz	Lamborghini Murciélago R-GT	**MI**	39
27 DNF	GT	26	(France) DAMS	(Italy) Beppe Gabbiani (Bolivia) Filipe Ortiz	Lamborghini 6.0 L V12	**MI**	39
28 DNF	GT	8	(United Kingdom) Ray Mallock Ltd.	(United Kingdom) Chris Goodwin (Portugal) Miguel Ramos	Saleen S7-R	**D**	0
28 DNF	GT	8	(United Kingdom) Ray Mallock Ltd.	(United Kingdom) Chris Goodwin (Portugal) Miguel Ramos	Ford Windsor 7.0 L V8	**D**	0
29 DNF	GT	27	(United Kingdom) Creation Autosportif	(United Kingdom) Jamie Campbell-Walter (United Kingdom) Jamie Derbyshire	Lister Storm	**D**	0
29 DNF	GT	27	(United Kingdom) Creation Autosportif	(United Kingdom) Jamie Campbell-Walter (United Kingdom) Jamie Derbyshire	Jaguar 7.0 L V12	**D**	0
DSQ^{†}	N-GT	62	(Italy) G.P.C. Giesse Squadra Corse	(Switzerland) Iradj Alexander (Italy) Christian Pescatori	Ferrari 360 Modena GTC	**P**	94
DSQ^{†}	N-GT	62	(Italy) G.P.C. Giesse Squadra Corse	(Switzerland) Iradj Alexander (Italy) Christian Pescatori	Ferrari F131 3.6 L V8	**P**	94
DNS	N-GT	89	(Italy) Scuderia Veregra	(Italy) Roberto Castagna (Italy) Bepo Orlandi	Porsche 911 GT3-RS	?	–
DNS	N-GT	89	(Italy) Scuderia Veregra	(Italy) Roberto Castagna (Italy) Bepo Orlandi	Porsche M96/79 3.6 L Flat-6	?	–

† – #62 G.P.C. Giesse Squadra Corse was disqualified after failing post-race technical inspection. The car's airbox was larger than regulations allowed.

== Statistics ==
- Pole position – #2 BMS Scuderia Italia – 1:45.593
- Fastest lap – #5 Vitaphone Racing Team – 1:47.399
- Average speed – 158.150 km/h

FIA GT Championship
Previous race: 2004 Spa 24 Hours	2004 season	Next race: 2004 FIA GT Oschersleben 500km
