= List of Ferrari engines =

This is a list of internal combustion engines manufactured by Ferrari.

== Straight-4 ==
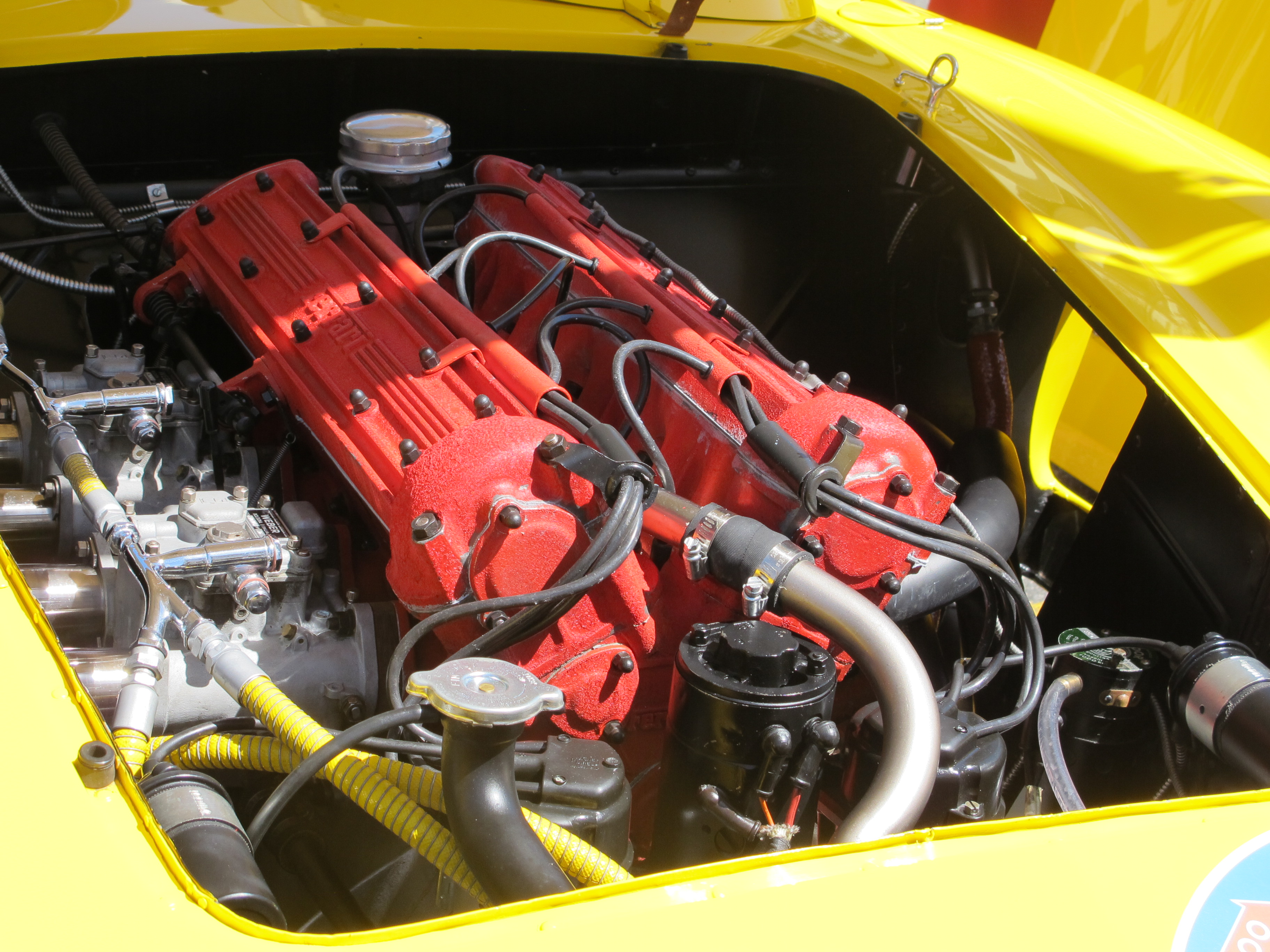
The Lampredi 500 four cylinder (TR version)

Lampredi designed a straight-4 engine for Formula Two use. Different versions of this engine were later used in Formula One and sports car racing.

- Lampredi
  - 1951 ––– 500 F2, 500 Mondial, 500 TR, 500 TRC
    - 1,984.86 cc – 185 PS (136 kW) at 7,500 rpm (Bore 90 mm X Stroke 78 mm) 496.215 cc and 46.25 PS (34 kW) per cylinder 93.2 PS (69 kW)/litre
  - 1953 ––– 553 F2
    - 1,997.12 cc – 180 PS (132 kW) at 7,200 rpm (Bore 93 mm X Stroke 73.5 mm) 499.28 cc and 45 PS (33 kW) per cylinder 90.13 PS (66 kW)/litre
  - 1953 ––– 625 F1, 625 TF, 625 LM
    - 2,498.32 cc – 210–230 PS (154–169 kW) at 7,000 rpm (Bore 94 mm X Stroke 90 mm) 624.58 cc and 52.5-57.5 PS per cylinder 84-92 PS/litre
  - 1954 ––– 553 F1, 555 F1
    - 2,497.56 cc – 260 PS (191 kW) at 7,200 rpm (Bore 100 mm X Stroke 79.5 mm) 624.39 cc and 65 PS per cylinder 104 PS/litre
  - 1953 ––– 735 S
    - 2,941.66 cc – 225 PS (165 kW) at 6,800 rpm (Bore 102 mm X Stroke 90 mm) 735.41 cc and 56.25 PS per cylinder 76.5 PS/litre
  - 1954 ––– 750 Monza
    - 2,999.62 cc – 260 PS (191 kW) at 6,000 rpm (Bore 103 mm X Stroke 90 mm) 749.90 cc and 63.5 PS per cylinder 85 PS/litre
  - 1955 ––– 857 S, 860 Monza
    - 3,431.94 cc – 280 PS (206 kW) at 6,000 rpm (Bore 102 mm X Stroke 105 mm) 857.98 cc and 70 PS per cylinder 81.6 PS/litre

== Straight-6 ==
Lampredi also modified his four into a straight-6 for racing use.

- Lampredi
  - 1954 – Tipo 114 – 306 S
    - 2,977.29 cc – (Bore 90 mm X Stroke 78 mm) 496.215 cc per cylinder
  - 1955 – Tipo 118 – 376 S (118 LM)
    - 3,747.48 cc – 280 PS (206 kW) at 6,200 rpm (Bore 94 mm X Stroke 90 mm) 624.58 cc and 46.67 PS per cylinder 74.72 PS/litre
  - 1955 – Tipo 121 – 735 LM (121 LM)
    - 4,412.49 cc – 330 PS (243 kW) at 5,800 rpm (Bore 102 mm X Stroke 90 mm) 735.41 cc and 55 PS per cylinder 74.79 PS/litre

== V6 ==
Ferrari's Dino project of the late 1956 gave birth to the company's well-known 65° V6 DOHC engines. This Vittorio Jano design formed the basis of the company's modern engines right up through the mid-2000s (decade). Another series of V6 engines was started in 1959 with a 60° V-angle and single overhead camshafts design.

- Dino 65° DOHC
  - 1957 –– Dino 156 F2
    - 1,489.35 cc – 180 PS (132 kW) at 9,000 rpm (Bore 70 mm X Stroke 64.5 mm) 248.225 cc and 30 PS per cylinder – 120.86 PS/litre
  - 1958–1960 –– 246 F1/246 P F1
    - 2,417.34 cc – 280 PS (206 kW) at 8,500 rpm (Bore 85 mm X Stroke 71 mm) 402.89 cc and 46.67 PS per cylinder – 115.83 PS/litre
  - 1958 –– 326 MI
    - 3210.12 cc – 330 PS (243 kW) at 7,250 rpm (Bore 87 mm X Stroke 90 mm) 535.02 cc and 55 PS per cylinder – 102.8 PS/litre
  - 1958 –– Dino 196 S
    - 1983.72 cc – 280 PS (206 kW) at 7,200 rpm (Bore 77 mm X Stroke 71 mm) 330.62 cc and 32.5 PS per cylinder – 98.3 PS/litre
  - 1958 –– Dino 296 S
    - 2,962.092 cc – 300 PS (221 kW) at 7,600 rpm (Bore 85 mm X Stroke 87 mm) 493.682 cc and 50 PS per cylinder – 101.28 PS/litre
  - 1959 –– 256 F1
    - 2,474.55 cc – 295 PS (217 kW) at 8,600 rpm (Bore 86 mm X Stroke 71 mm) 412.425 cc and 49.17 PS per cylinder – 119.2 PS/litre
  - 1960 –– 156 F2
    - 1,476.60 cc – 185 PS (136 kW) at 9,200 rpm (Bore 73 mm X Stroke 58.8 mm) 246.10 cc and 30.83 PS per cylinder – 125.3 PS/litre
  - 1961 –– 246 SP
    - 2,417.34 cc – 270 PS (199 kW) at 8,000 rpm (Bore 85 mm X Stroke 71 mm) 402.89 cc and 45 PS per cylinder – 111.70 PS/litre
  - 1965 –– Dino 166 P
    - 1,592.58 cc – 175 PS (129 kW) at 9,000 rpm (Bore 77 mm X Stroke 57 mm) 265.43 cc and 29.17 PS per cylinder – 109.9 PS/litre
  - 1965–1969 –– Dino 206 SP, Dino 206 S, Dino 206 GT, Fiat Dino
    - 1,986.6 cc – 220 PS (162 kW) at 9.000 rpm (Bore 86 mm X Stroke 57 mm) 331.10 cc and 36.67 PS per cylinder – 110.75 PS/litre
  - 1967 –– Dino 166 F2
    - 1,596.258 cc – 200 PS (147 kW) at 10.000 rpm (Bore 86 mm X Stroke 45.8 mm) 266.043 cc and 33.33 PS per cylinder – 125.3 PS/litre
  - 1966–1968 –– 246 F1-66, Dino 246 Tasmania
    - 2,404.74 cc – 285 PS (210 kW) at 8.900 rpm (Bore 90 mm X Stroke 63 mm) 400.79 cc and 47.5 PS per cylinder – 118.52 PS/litre
  - 1969–1974 –– Dino 246 GT, Fiat Dino, Lancia Stratos (iron-block version developed by Franco Rocchi and Aurelio Lampredi)
    - 2,419.2 cc – 195 PS (143 kW) at 7.600 rpm (Bore 92.5 mm X Stroke 60 mm) 403.2 cc and 32.5 PS per cylinder – 80.60 PS/litre
- Dino 60° SOHC
  - 1959 –– Dino 196 S
    - 1,983.72 cc – 195 PS (143 kW) at 7,800 rpm (Bore 77 mm X Stroke 71 mm) 330.62 cc and 32.5 PS per cylinder – 98.3 PS/litre
  - 1959–1960 –– Dino 246 S
    - 2,417.34 cc – 250 PS (184 kW)250 PS at 7,500 rpm (Bore 85 mm X Stroke 71 mm) 402.89 cc and 41.67 PS per cylinder – 103.42 PS/litre
  - 1962 –– 196 SP
    - 1,983.72 cc – 210 PS (154 kW) at 7,500 rpm (Bore 77 mm X Stroke 71 mm) 330.62 cc and 35 PS per cylinder – 105.86 PS/litre
  - 1962 –– 286 SP
    - 2,862.78 cc – 260 PS (191 kW) at 6,800 rpm (Bore 90 mm X Stroke 75 mm) 477.13 cc and 43.33 PS per cylinder – 90.82 PS/litre
- Chiti 120°
  - 1961–1962 –– 156 F1
    - 1,476.6 cc – 190 PS (140 kW) at 9,500 rpm (Bore 73 mm X Stroke 58.8 mm) 246.10 cc and 31.67 PS per cylinder – 128.674 PS/litre
  - 1963–1964 –– 156 F1-63
    - 1,476.6 cc – 205 PS (151 kW) at 10,500 rpm (Bore 73 mm X Stroke 58.8 mm) 246.10 cc and 34.17 PS per cylinder – 138.85 PS/litre
- Turbocharged Formula One V6 engines
  - Tipo 021, 031 & 032 (120° V angle) – designed by Mauro Forghieri and Nicola Materazzi
    - 1980–1986 1496 cc turbocharged – Ferrari 126C, Ferrari 156/85, Ferrari F1-86
  - Tipo 033 (90° V angle) – designed by Jean-Jacques His
    - 1987–1988 1496 cc turbocharged – Ferrari F1-87, Ferrari F1-87/88C
- Turbocharged Formula One V6 turbo-hybrid engines
  - Tipo 059 (90° V angle, 1600 cc turbocharged) – designed by Luca Marmorini
    - 2014–2015 1598 cc –– turbocharged – Ferrari F14 T, Ferrari SF15-T, Marussia MR-03, Marussia MR-03B, Sauber C33, Sauber C34
  - Tipo 060 (90° V angle, 1600 cc turbocharged)
    - 2016 – Toro Rosso STR11
  - Tipo 061 (90° V angle, 1600 cc turbocharged)
    - 2016 – Ferrari SF16-H, Haas VF-16, Sauber C35
    - 2017 – Sauber C36
  - Tipo 062 (90° V angle, 1600 cc turbocharged)
    - 2017 – Ferrari SF70H, Haas VF-17
    - 2018 (062 EVO) – Sauber C37, Haas VF-18, Ferrari SF71H
  - Tipo 064 (90° V angle, 1600 cc turbocharged)
    - 2019 – Ferrari SF90, Alfa Romeo C38, Haas VF-19
  - Tipo 065 (90° V angle, 1600 cc turbocharged)
    - 2020 (065) – Ferrari SF1000, Alfa Romeo C39, Haas VF-20
    - 2021 (065/6) – Ferrari SF21, Alfa Romeo C41, Haas VF-21
  - Tipo 066 (90° V angle, 1600 cc turbocharged)
    - 2022 (066/7) – Ferrari F1-75, Alfa Romeo C42, Haas VF-22
    - 2023 – 2024 (066/10) – Ferrari SF-23, Alfa Romeo C43, Haas VF-23, Haas VF-24
    - 2024 (066/12) – Ferrari SF-24, Kick Sauber C44
    - 2025 (066/15) – Ferrari SF-25, Kick Sauber C45, Haas VF-25
  - Tipo 067 (90° V angle, 1600 cc turbocharged)
    - 2026 (067/6) – Ferrari SF-26, Cadillac MAC-26, Haas VF-26
- Tipo F163 (120° V angle, turbocharged)
  - 2022 2,992.4 cc – Ferrari 296 GTB

== V8 ==
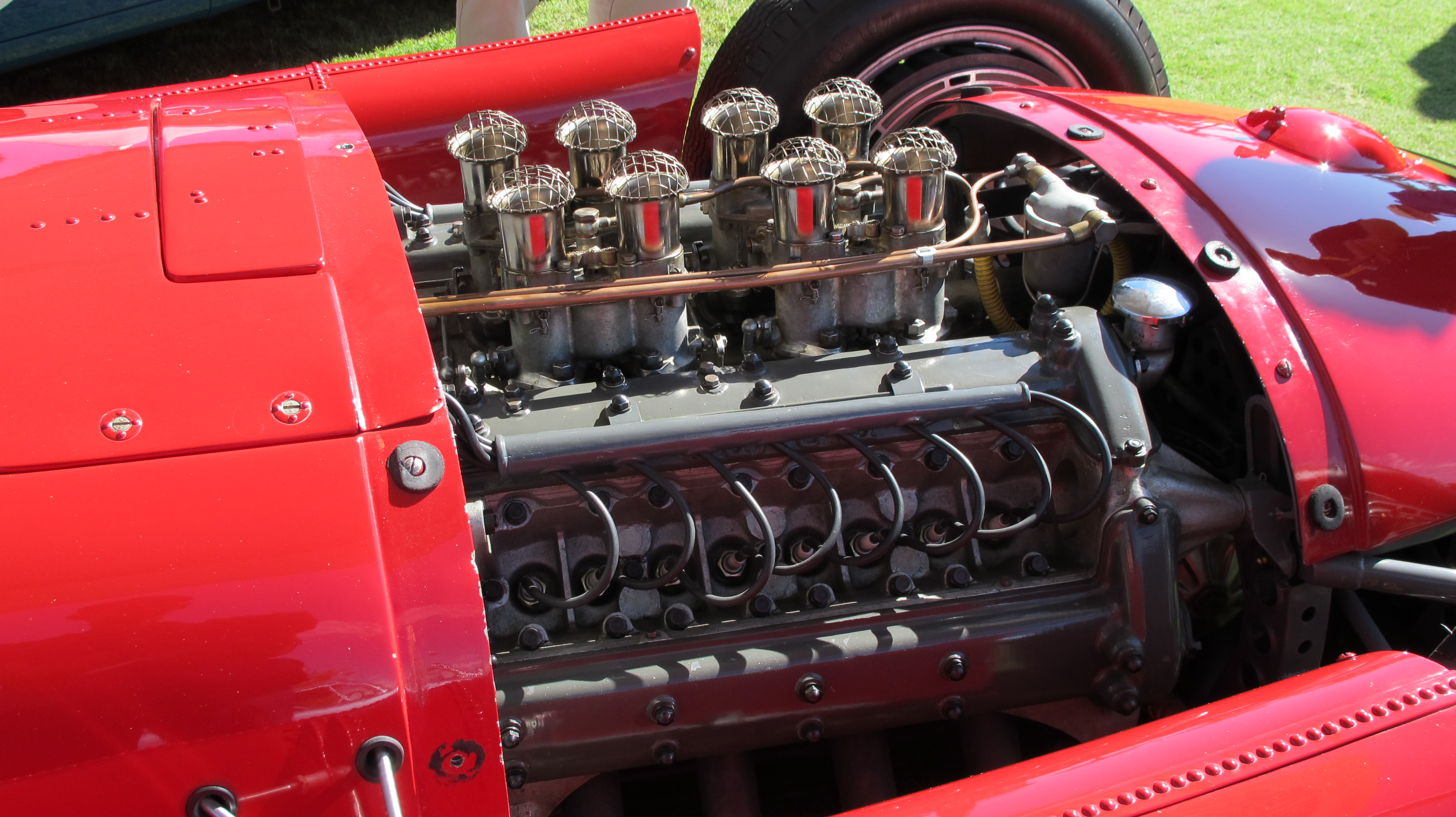
Lancia - Ferrari D50 engine

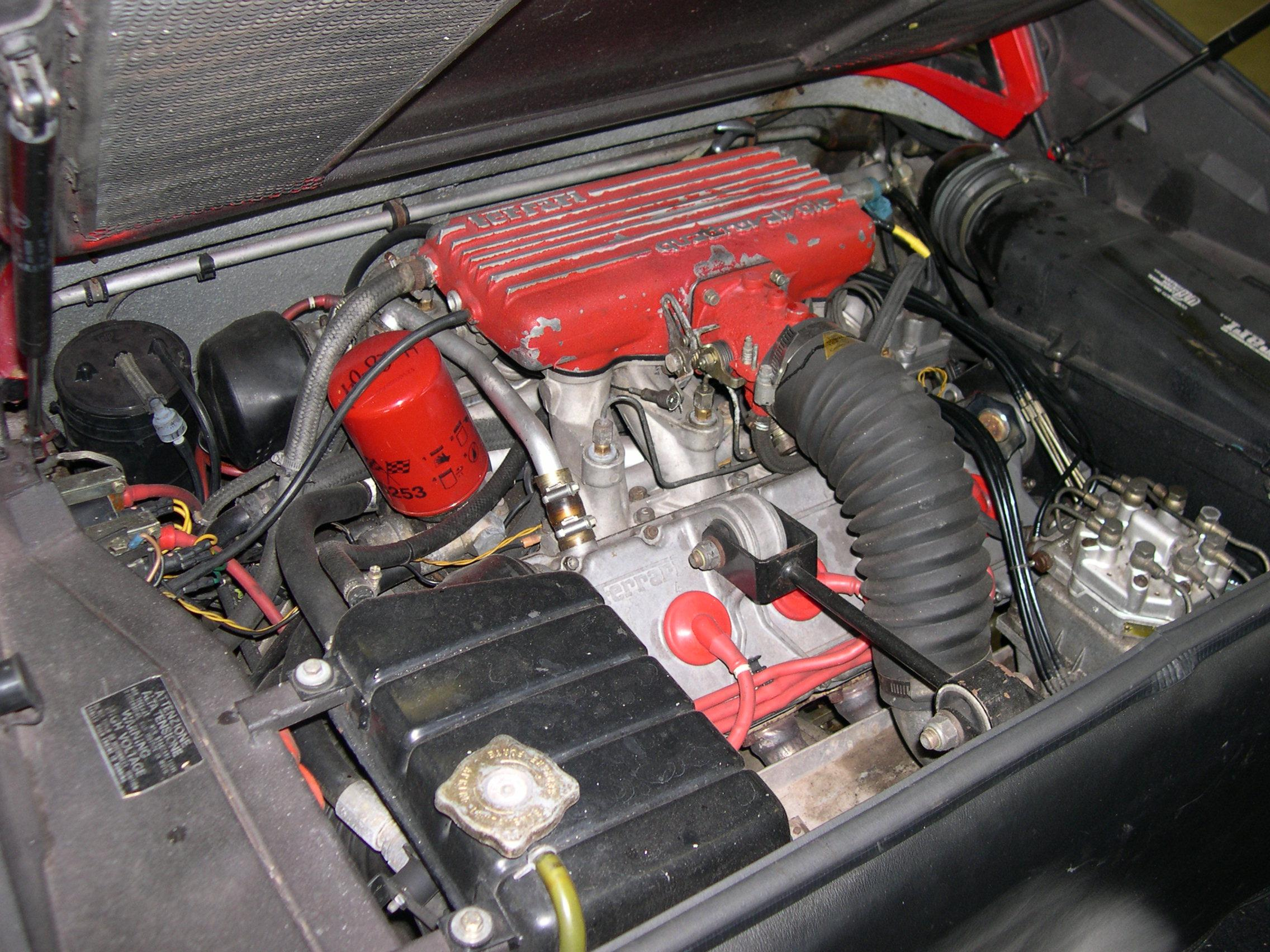
2.9 L Quattrovalvole V8 in a 1984 Ferrari 308 GTB

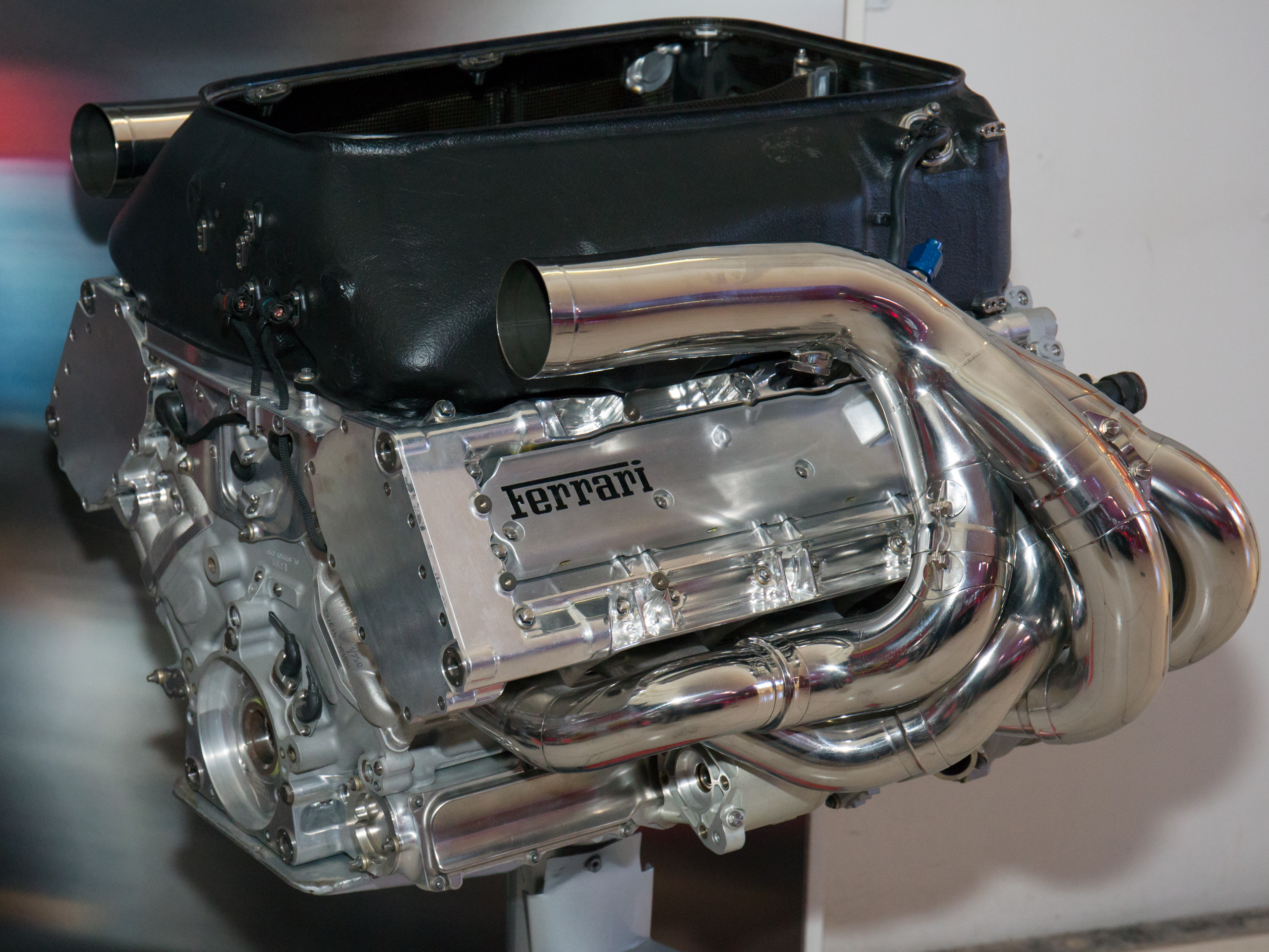
Ferrari Tipo 056 F1 racing engine (2008).

The first Ferrari V8 engine was derived from a Lancia project, used in D50 F1 racecar. The Dino V8 family lasted from the early 1970s through 2004 when it was replaced by a new Ferrari/Maserati design.

- Lancia derived (Jano)
  - 1955 2488 cc – DS50
  - 1956 2485 cc – DS50, 801
  - 1957 2499 cc – 801
- Chiti
  - 1962 –– Tipo 199 – 248 SP
    - 2458.70 cc – 250 PS (184 kW) at 7,400 rpm (Bore 77 mm X Stroke 66 mm) 307.337 cc and 31.25 PS per cylinder – 101.68 PS/litre
  - 1962 –– Tipo 202 – 268 SP
    - 2644.96 cc – 265 PS (195 kW)265 PS at 7,000 rpm (Bore 77 mm X Stroke 71 mm) 330.62 cc and 33.125 PS per cylinder – 100.19 PS/litre
- Tipo 205/B (designed by Franco Rocchi and Angelo Bellei)
  - 1964–1965 –– 158 F1
    - 1489.23 cc – 210 PS (154 kW) at 11,000 rpm (Bore 67 mm X Stroke 52.8 mm) 186.15 cc and 26.25 PS per cylinder – 141 PS/litre
- Dino
  - 1973–1983 –– 308 GT4, 308 GTB/GTS
    - 2926.9 cc – 255 PS (188 kW) at 7,700 rpm (Bore 81 mm X Stroke 71 mm) 365.86 cc and 31.875 PS per cylinder – 86.83 PS/litre
  - 1975–1981 –– 208 GT4, 208 GTB/GTS
    - 1990.63 cc – 170 PS (125 kW) (for 208 GT4) or 155 PS (for 208 GTB/GTS models) at 7,700 rpm (Bore 66.8 mm X Stroke 71 mm) 248.83 cc and 21.25 PS per cylinder – 85.4 PS/litre
  - 1982–1989 1990 cc turbocharged –– 208 GTB/GTS Turbo, GTB/GTS Turbo
  - 1984–1985 2855 cc turbocharged –– Tipo F114B – 288 GTO (designed by Nicola Materazzi)
  - 1980–1982 2926 cc fuel injection –– 308 GTBi/GTSi, Mondial 8
  - 1982–1985 2926 cc quattrovalvole –– 308 GTB/GTS qv, Mondial qv
  - 1985–1989 3185 cc –– 328 GTB/GTS, 3.2 Mondial
  - 1987–1988 2936 cc turbocharged –– Tipo F120A – F40(designed by Nicola Materazzi)
  - 1989–1995 3405 cc –– Mondial t, 348 tb/ts, GTB/GTS, Spider
  - 1994–1999 3496 cc 5-valve –– F355 GTB, GTS, Spider
  - 1999–2004 3586 cc 5-valve –– 360 Modena, Spider, Challenge Stradale
- Tipo F136 Ferrari/Maserati engine
  - 2001–2019 4244 cc –– Maserati Coupé, Maserati Spyder, Maserati Quattroporte V, Maserati GranTurismo
  - 2004–2009 4308 cc –– F430
  - 2007–2019 4691 cc –– Maserati Quattroporte V, Maserati GranTurismo, Alfa Romeo 8C Competizione
  - 2008–2014 4297 cc –– California
  - 2009–2015 4499 cc –– 458
- Tipo 056 (F1 engine) (designed by Gilles Simon)
  - 2006–2013 2398 cc –– 248 F1, F2007, F2008, F60, F10, 150° Italia, F2012, F138, Force India VJM01, Red Bull RB2, Spyker F8-VII/VIIB, Toro Rosso STR2/2B, STR3, STR4, STR5, STR6, STR7, STR8, Sauber C29, C30, C31, C32
- Tipo F154 (turbocharged)
  - 2013–present 3797 cc –– Maserati Quattroporte GTS/Trofeo, Maserati Levante GTS/Trofeo, Maserati Ghibli Trofeo
  - 2014–present 3855 cc –– California T, GTC4Lusso T, Portofino, Roma
  - 2015–present 3902 cc –– 488, F8
  - 2020–present 3990 cc –– SF90 Stradale

== V10 ==
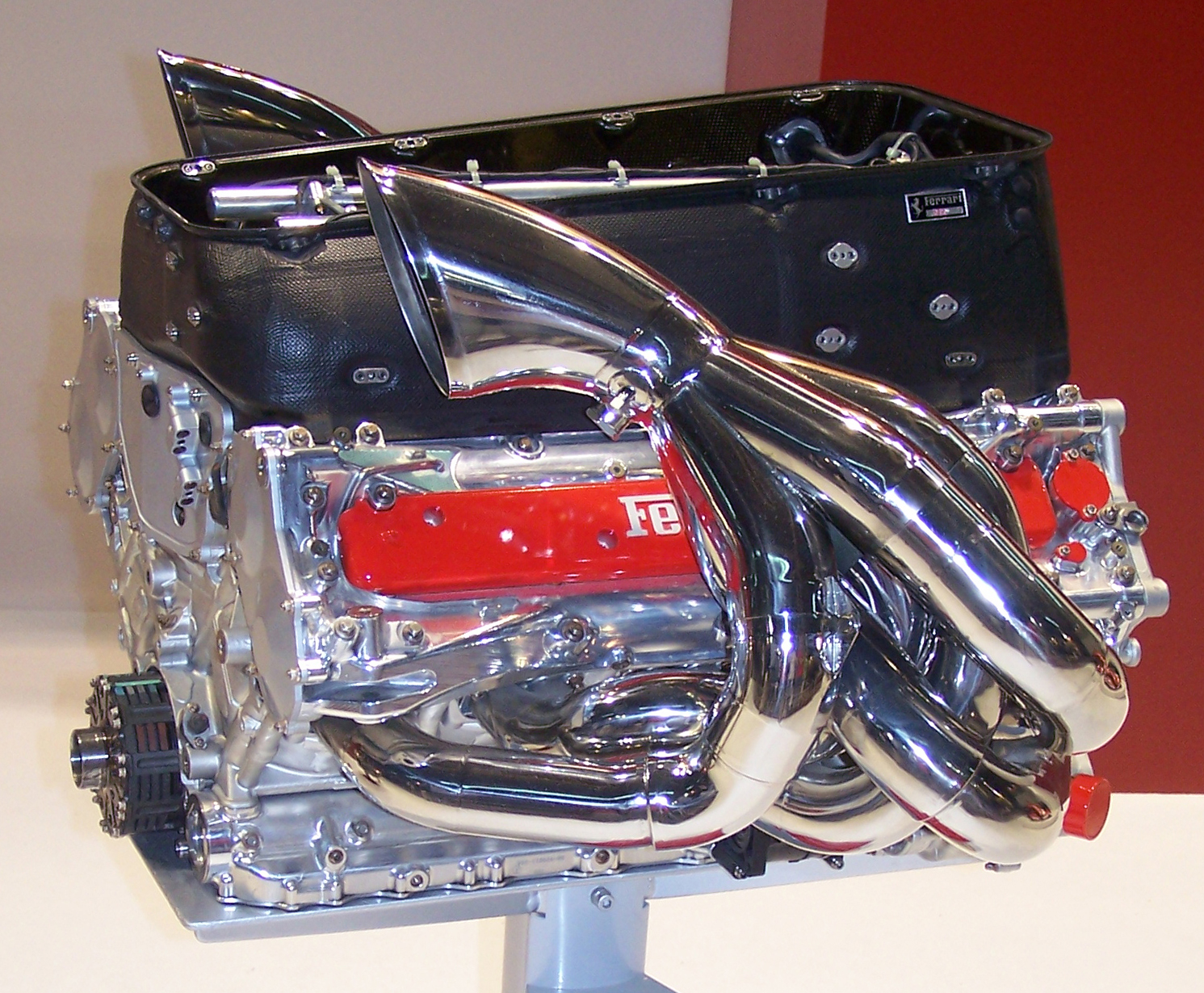
A 2004 Ferrari model 053 V10 engine of the Ferrari F2004

Ferrari used V10 engines only for F1 racecars, between 1996 and 2005.

- 75°
  - 1996–1997 2998 cc – F310, F310B
- 80°
  - 1998–1999 2997 cc – F300, F399
- 90°
  - 2000–2005 2997 cc – F1-2000, F2001, F2002, F2003-GA, F2004, F2005

== V12 ==
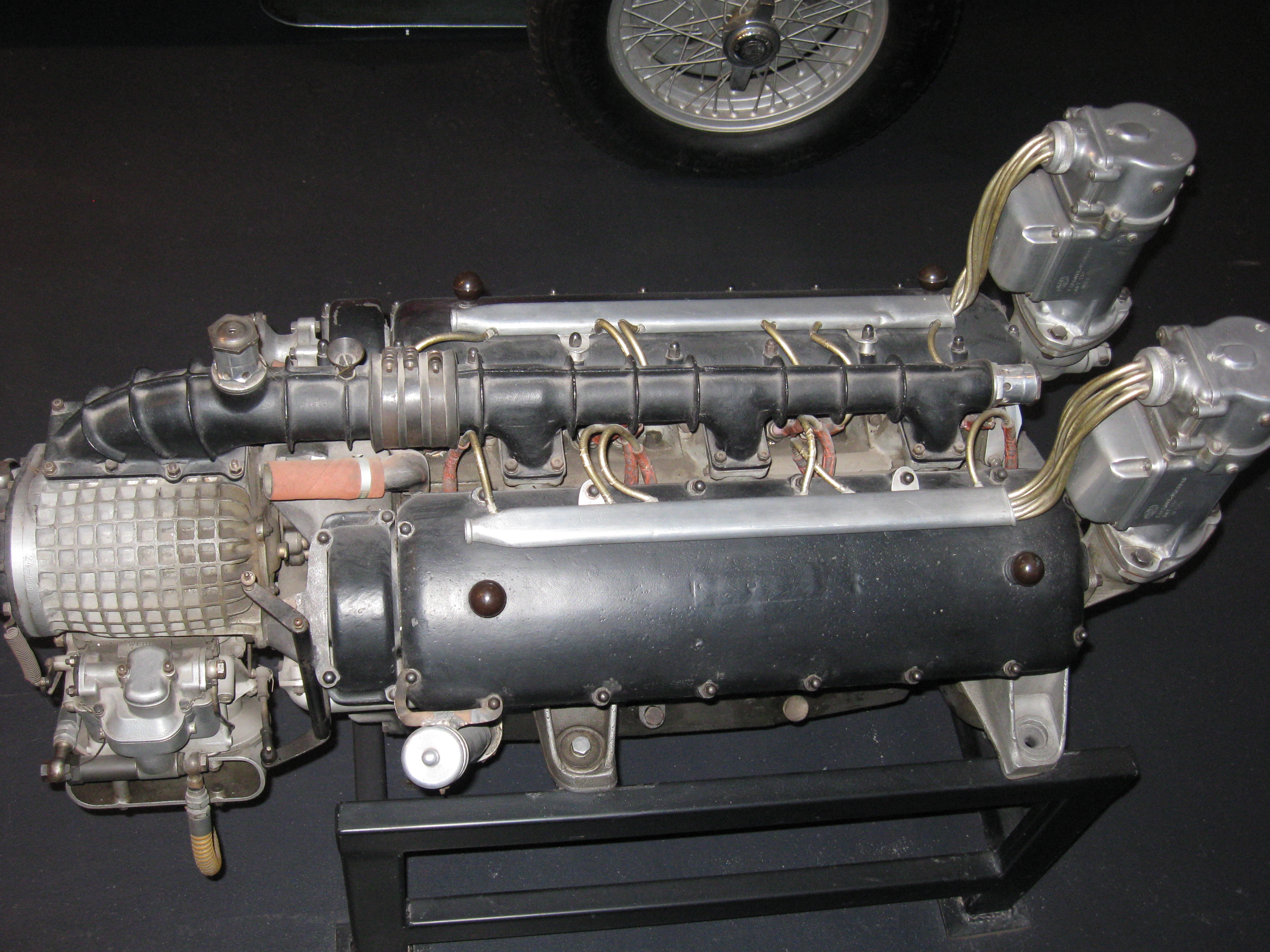
Supercharged Columbo V12 125 F1 (early version)

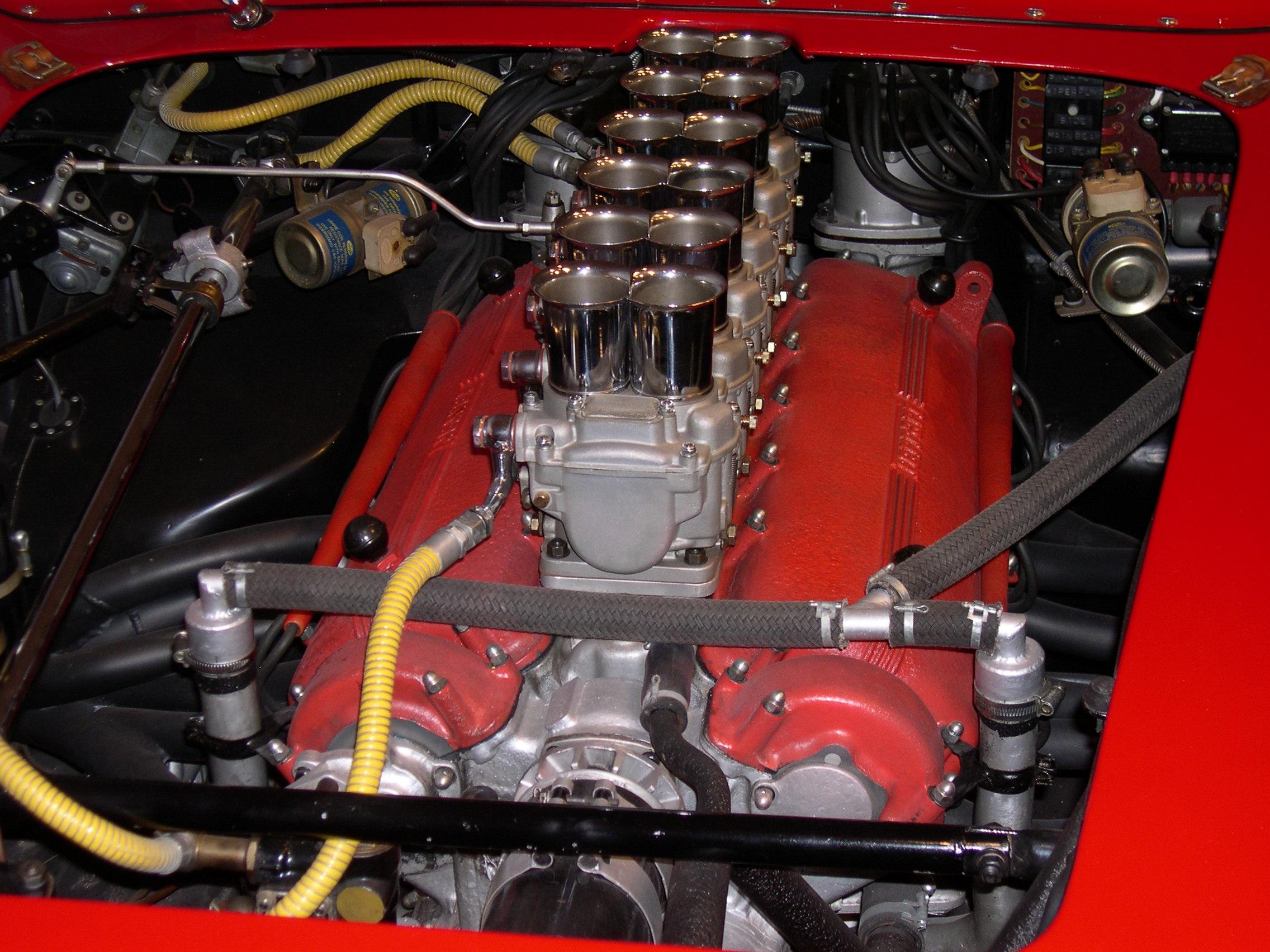
Colombo engine in a 1961 Ferrari 250 Testa Rossa

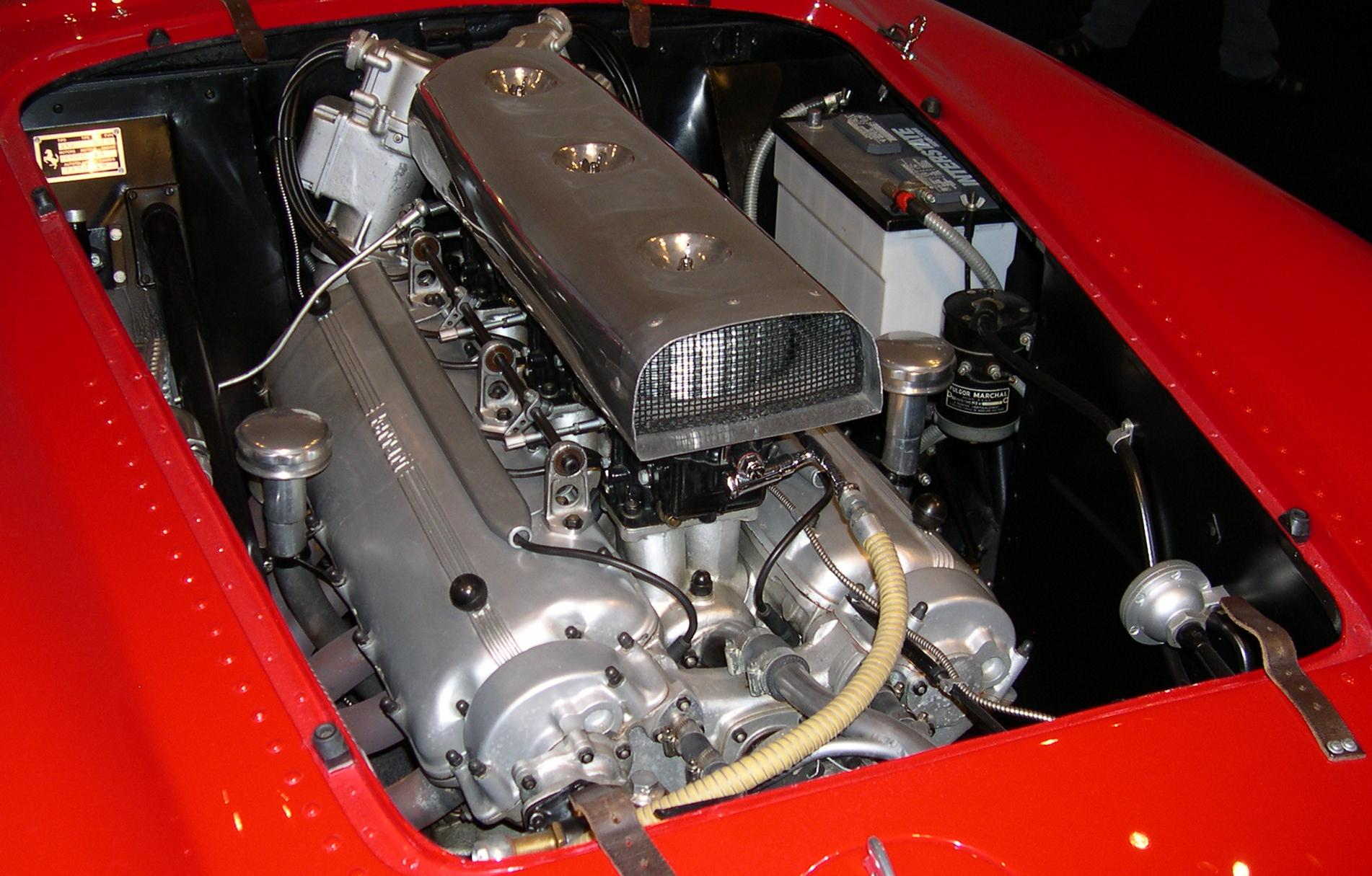
Lampredi V12 in a 1954 Ferrari 375 Plus

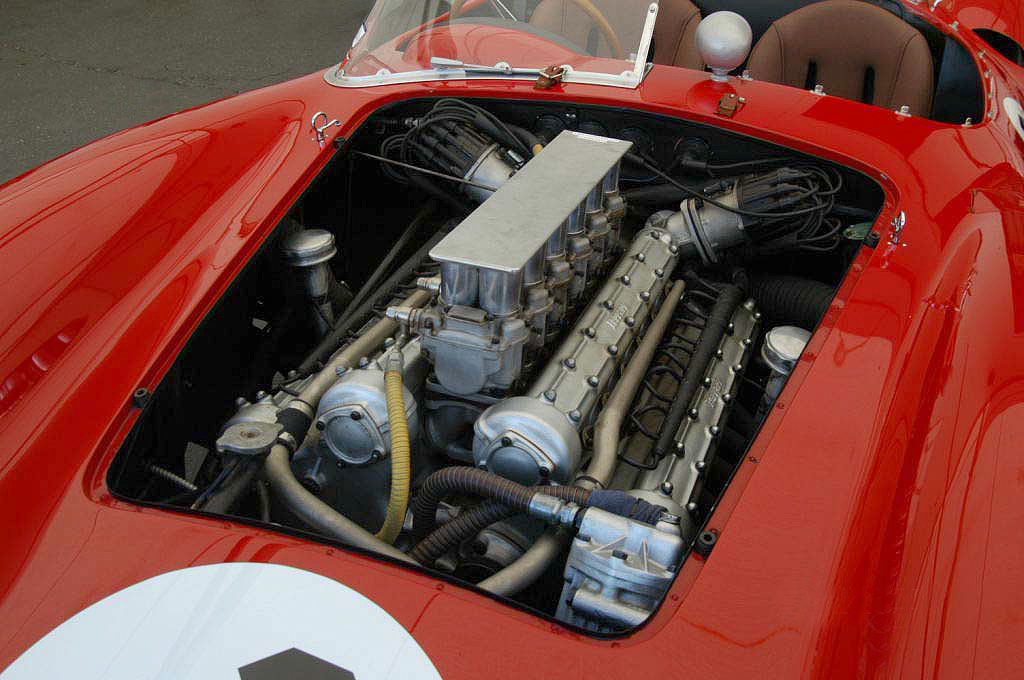
Jano V12 in a 1958 Ferrari 412 S

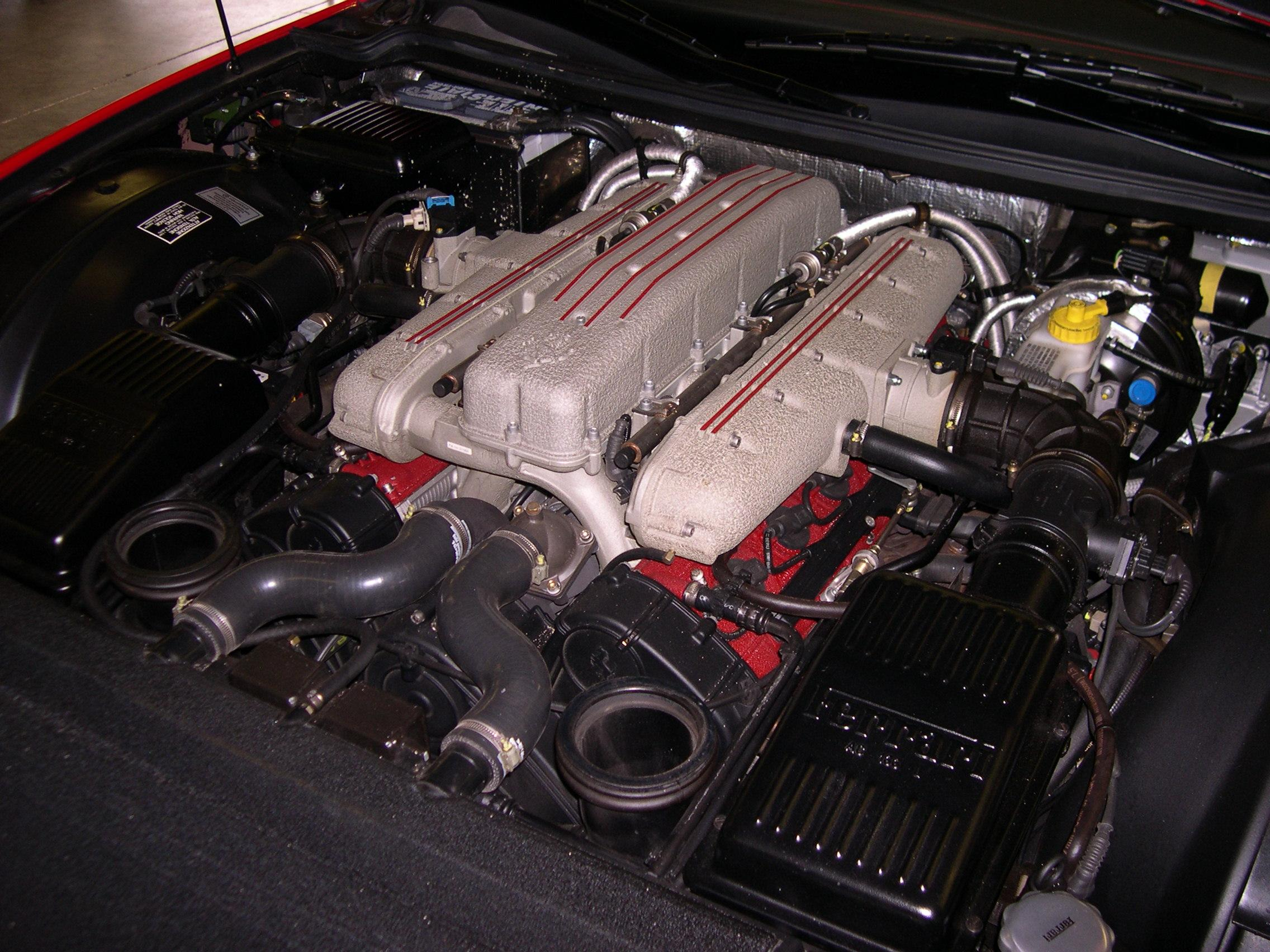
Tipo 133 V12 in a 2001 Ferrari 550

Ferrari is best known for its V12 engines.

- Colombo (60° V angle)
  - 1947 1497 cc – 125 S
  - 1947 1903 cc – 159 S
  - 1947–1953 1995 cc – 166
  - 1948–1950 1497 cc supercharged – 125 F1
  - 1949–1952 1995 cc supercharged – 166 FL
  - 1950–1951 2341 cc – 195
  - 1950–1953 2563 cc – 212
  - 1952 2714 cc – 225 S
  - 1952–1954 2953 cc – 250 S, 250 MM
  - 1954 2953 cc – Tipo 117/107 – 250 Monza
  - 1954–1956 2953 cc – Tipo 112 – 250 Europa GT
  - 1956–1963 2953 cc – Tipo 128 – 250 GT Coupé, 250 GT LWB/GTE
  - 1959–1964 2953 cc – Tipo 168 – 250 GT SWB/GTO/GTL
  - 1959–1964 3967 cc – Tipo 163 – 400 Superamerica, 330 TRI/LM, 330 LMB
  - 1964–1966 4962 cc – Tipo 208 – 500 Superfast
  - 1964–1967 3286 cc – Tipo 213 – 275 GTB/GTS
  - 1966–1968 3967 cc – Tipo 209 – 330 America, 330 GTC
  - 1967–1968 3286 cc – Tipo 226 – 275 GTB/4
  - 1966–1976 4390 cc – 365, 365 GTC/4, Daytona
  - 1969–1970 2991 cc – Ferrari 312 P
  - 1976–1984 4823 cc – 400
  - 1985–1989 4943 cc – 412
- Lampredi (60° V angle)
  - 1950 3322 cc – 275 S, 275 F1
  - 1950–1953 4101 cc – 340 F1, 340/342 America, Ferrari 340 Mexico/MM
  - 1950–1954 4493 cc – 375 F1/375 MM
  - 1952 4382 cc – 375 Indianapolis
  - 1953–1955 4522 cc – 375 America/375 MM
  - 1953 2963 cc – 250 Europa
  - 1954 4954 cc – 375 Plus
  - 1955–1959 4962 cc – 410 S, 410 Superamerica
- Jano (60° V angle) – designed by Vittorio Jano, Vittorio Bellentani and Alberto Massimino
  - 1956 3490 cc – Tipo 130 – 290 MM
  - 1957 3490 cc – Tipo 136 – 290 S
  - 1957 3783 cc – Tipo 140 – 315 S
  - 1957 2953 cc – Tipo 142 – 312 S
  - 1957–1958 4023 cc – Tipo 141 – 335 S, 412 MI, 412 S
- 3.5L F1 engines (65° V angle)
  - 1989–1994 3500 cc – Ferrari 640, Ferrari 641, Ferrari 642, Ferrari 643, Ferrari F92A, Ferrari F93A, Ferrari 412 T1
- 3.5/3.0L F1 engines (75° V angle)
  - 1995 3000 cc – Ferrari 412 T2
- Tipo F116 & F133 (65° V angle)
  - 1992–2001 5474 cc – 456/456 M, 550 Maranello/ 550 Barchetta Pininfarina
  - 2002–2011 5748 cc – 575M Maranello/ Superamerica, 612 Scaglietti
- Ferrari iron block (Tipo F130 and F310) (65° V angle)
  - 1994–1999 –– 333 SP
    - 3,997.12 cc – 480 kW (650 PS) at 11,000 rpm (Bore 85 mm X Stroke 58.7 mm) 333.1 cc and 54.17 PS per cylinder – 162.62 PS/litre
  - 1995–1997 –– F50, F50 GT
    - 4,698.49 cc – 551 kW (749 PS) at 10,500 rpm (Bore 85 mm X Stroke 69 mm) 391.54 cc and 62,42 PS per cylinder – 159.42 PS/litre
- Tipo F140 (65° V angle)
  - 2003–2012 5998 cc – Enzo Ferrari, 599 GTB Fiorano/ 599 GTO, Maserati MC12
  - 2005–present 6262 cc – FF, GTC4Lusso, F12berlinetta/F12tdf, LaFerrari
  - 2017–present 6496 cc – 812, Daytona SP3, Purosangue, 12Cilindri

== Flat-12 ==
- Mauro Forghieri-designed racing flat-12s
  - 1964–1965 1490 cc – Tipo 207 – 512 F1
  - 1969 1991 cc – Tipo 232 – 212 E Montagna
  - 1970–1974 2992 cc – Tipo 001 – Ferrari 312B series
  - 1971–1973 2992 cc – Tipo 001 – Ferrari 312PB
  - 1975–1980 2992 cc – Tipo 015 – Ferrari 312T series
- Roadgoing flat-12s, designed by Giuliano de Angelis and Angelo Bellei
  - 1971–1976 4390 cc – Tipo F102A – 365 GT4 BB
  - 1976–1981 4942 cc – Tipo F102B – 512 BB
  - 1981–1984 – Tipo F110A – 512 BBi
  - 1984–1991 – Tipo F113A/B – Testarossa
  - 1991–1994 – Tipo F113/D – 512 TR
  - 1994–1996 – Tipo F113/G – F512 M

== See also ==
- Ferrari
- List of Ferrari road cars
- List of Ferrari competition cars
