= Ferrari flat-12 engine =

Tipo 207/232/001/015
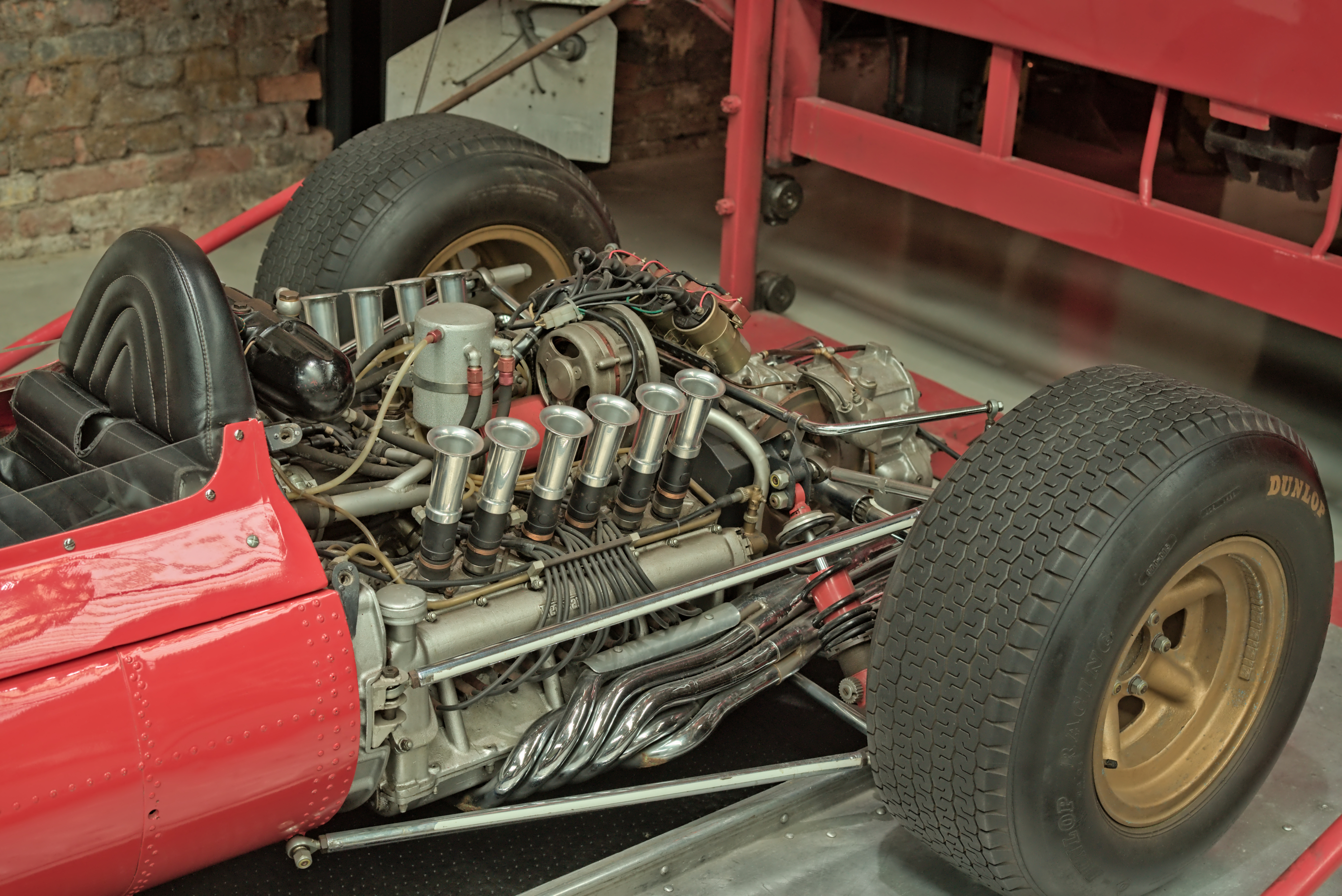
- Ferrari 1512 Tipo 207 engine

Overview
- Manufacturer: Ferrari
- Designer: Mauro Forghieri
- Production: 1964–1980

Layout
- Configuration: 180° Flat-12
- Displacement: 1.5 L (1,489.63 cc); 2.0 L (1,999.08 cc); 3.0 L (2,991 cc)
- Cylinder bore: 56 mm (2.2 in); 65 mm (2.6 in); 78.5 mm (3.09 in); 80 mm (3.1 in)
- Piston stroke: 50.4 mm (1.98 in); 50 mm (2.0 in); 51.5 mm (2.03 in); 49.6 mm (1.95 in)
- Cylinder block material: aluminum
- Cylinder head material: aluminum
- Valvetrain: DOHC

Combustion
- Fuel type: Petrol
- Cooling system: Water cooled

Chronology
- Predecessor: Ferrari Colombo engine
- Successor: Ferrari V12 F1 engine

The Ferrari flat-12 engine family is a series of flat-12 DOHC petrol engines produced by Ferrari from 1964 to 1996. The first racing Ferrari flat-12, the Mauro Forghieri-designed Tipo 207, was introduced in the Ferrari 1512 F1 car in 1964. Later flat-12 racing engines were used in Ferrari Formula One and sports racing cars from 1968 until 1980, including the 212 E Montagna, 312 B series, 312 PB and 312 T series. The roadgoing flat-12 engines were introduced with the 365 GT4 BB and were produced in various versions until the end of F512 M production in 1996.

== Configuration and nomenclature ==
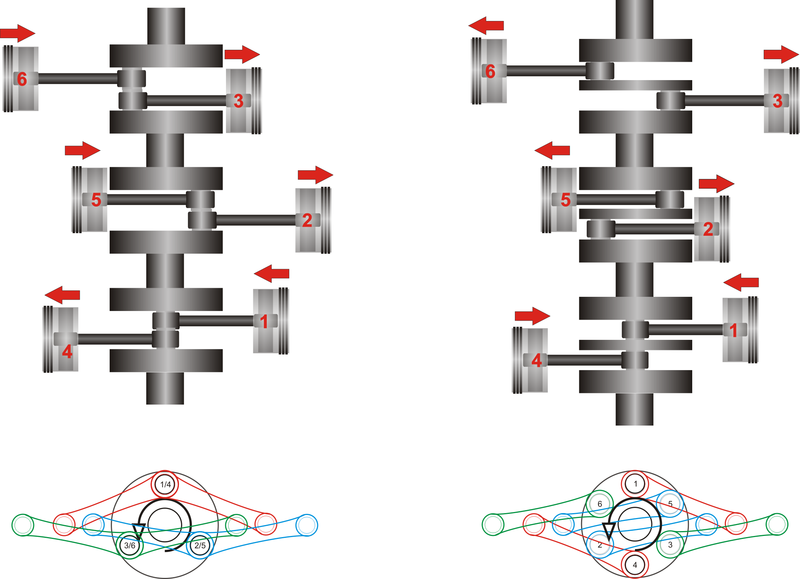
Difference between two example flat 6 cylinder engines: 180° V on the left, boxer on the right. Ferrari flat-12s follow the configuration on the left.

Ferrari flat-12 engines have two banks of 6 cylinders oriented at 180 degrees from each other in a horizontally opposed or "flat" layout. This layout was first utilized in a Ferrari engine by engineer Mauro Forghieri in the 1964 Ferrari 1512 Formula One racing car, which was the first flat-12 car of any type to race. Ferrari had previously only manufactured engines with V or straight cylinder layouts. The flat-12 engine was initially developed for use in Ferrari racing cars because the shape of the engine resulted in a lower center of gravity, which improved various handling dynamics. In the later 312 B and 312 T F1 cars, the low height of the flat-12 was aerodynamically advantageous, as it allowed additional airflow to reach the rear spoiler.

All Ferrari flat-12 engines have a crankshaft design where each pair of opposing connecting rods use the same crank pin, a trait shared with earlier Ferrari V12 engines. This distinguishes this engine design from a boxer engine. According to engine designer Forghieri:

“Please, don’t call it boxer. Technically, it is correct to say that this engine is a flat-12, or has 12 cylinders with the heads at a vee angle of 180°. The difference between this engine and a true ‘boxer’ is that on the Ferrari engine the corresponding connecting rods of each bank are coupled on the same crankpin, so the two pistons move in the same direction, whereas in a true boxer engine (for example the flat-six Porsche engine) the pistons move in opposite directions.”

— Mauro Forghieri, quoted in Ferrari Engines by Reggiani and Bluemel

Three names for the Ferrari flat-12 engines are in common use: "flat-12", "180° V12" and "boxer." "Flat" does not specify crankshaft design and therefore can refer to either a non-boxer engine like the Ferrari or a true boxer engine like a Porsche flat-6. Alternatively, some sources prefer to call Ferrari flat-12 engines a "180° V12", referring to the V12-derived crankshaft design and the 180° angle between cylinder banks. Other sources refer to them as "boxer" engines. Despite the technical inaccuracy of "boxer", this term is widely used both in the press and official Ferrari publications, including the factory-issued specifications of the 312 B F1 and sales brochures for the BB 512 road car.

== Racing engines ==
=== Tipo 207 ===
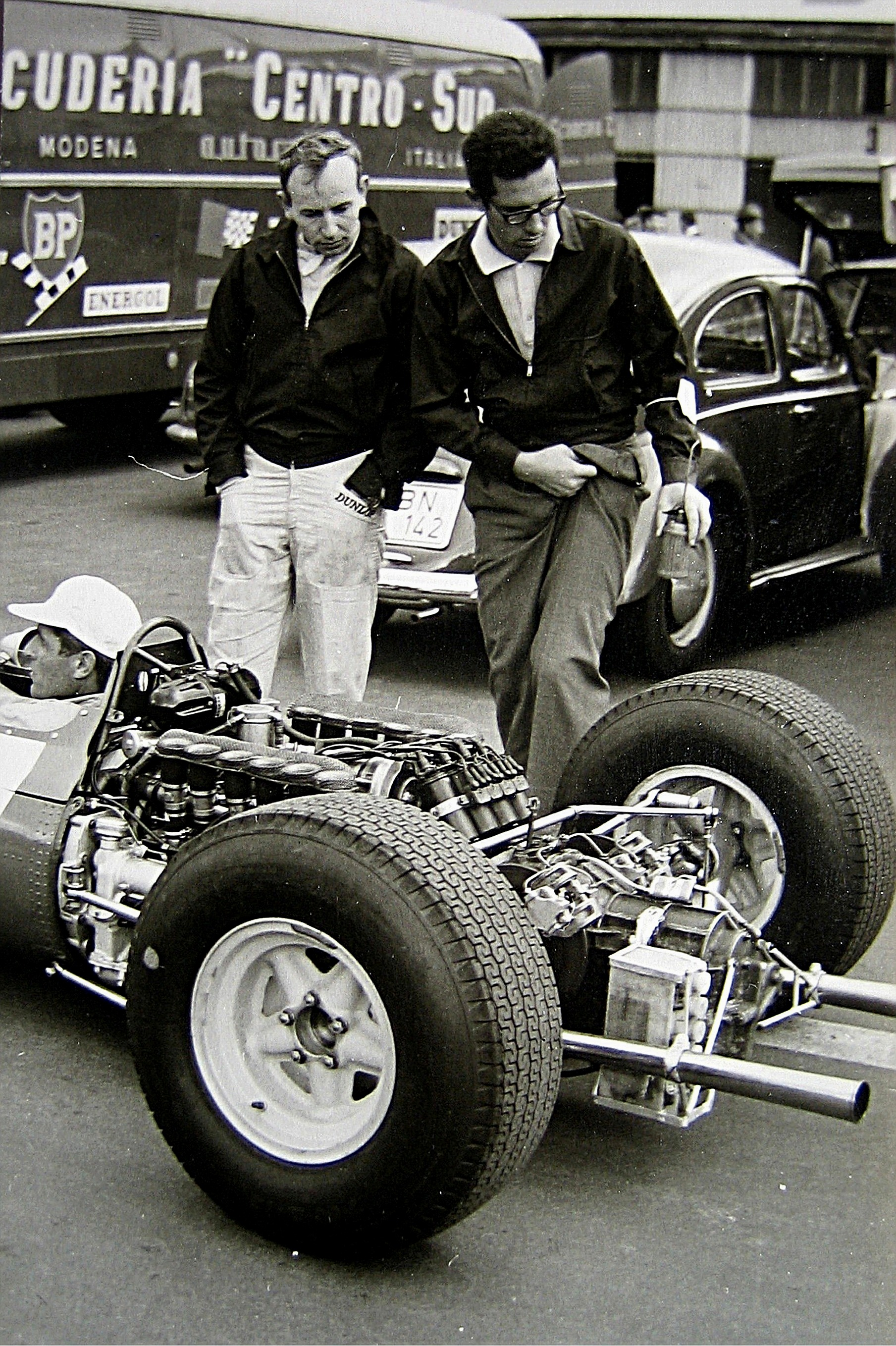
John Surtees (standing, left) and Mauro Forghieri (right) inspect the Tipo 207 engine in a 1964 Ferrari 1512

Ferrari's first flat-12 engine design was the 1.5-liter Tipo 207, used in the 1964-65 Ferrari 1512 Formula One car (also known as the 512 F1). The Tipo 207 flat-12 engine was designed by Mauro Forghieri and displaced 1,489.63 cc (90.903 cu in) with a bore and stroke of 56.0 mm × 50.4 mm (2.20 in × 1.98 in) and a compression ratio of 9.8:1. The crankcase was cast from aluminum alloy. The crankshaft ran in seven main bearings. Four gear-driven overhead camshafts operated one intake and one exhaust valve per cylinder. The ignition system used twin distributors (chain-driven off the timing gears) and a single spark plug per cylinder. Ancillary components such as the alternator, fuel pump and injection pumps were placed on top of the engine. The first version of the Tipo 207 engine, presented to the press at Ferrari's December 1963 press conference, was equipped with an indirect fuel injection system manufactured by Lucas. This was changed to a full Bosch injection and ignition system prior to the car's competition debut in 1964. In 1965, the engine was revised with a new cylinder head design and revised injection trumpets.

The engine developed 220 PS (162 kW; 217 hp) at 12,000 rpm, compared to the 210 PS (154 kW; 207 hp) at 11,000 rpm of the 158's V8 engine. This power output made it one of the most powerful contemporary 1.5-litre Formula One engines, possibly surpassed by Honda's RA271 V12. However, the engine's torque curve was not broad enough to provide a significant advantage over other cars and the 1512 was not competitive by the end of the 1965 season.

=== Tipo 232 ===
The 2-liter Tipo 232 flat-12 engine was developed for the 1968 Ferrari Sport 2000 (later called 212 E Montagna) sports racing car. The engine was designed by Ferrari engineer Stefano Jacoponi, based on the earlier Forghieri-designed Tipo 207 flat-12. Overall capacity of this engine was 1,990.08 cc (121.442 cu in), bore and stroke was 65 mm x 50 mm and the compression ratio was 11:1. The crankcase was aluminum alloy with cast-iron cylinder liners. While the displacement was increased over the Tipo 207, the Tipo 232 was more compact. It had four main bearings (instead of the seven used on the earlier engine), the 27° included angle between the intake and exhaust valves was narrower and ancillary ignition/fuel injection components were mounted lower. Like the Tipo 207, the engine used four gear-driven overhead camshafts, but now operating two intake and two exhaust valves per cylinder. Fuel was delivered by a Lucas indirect injection system. A Magneti Marelli transistorized ignition system was equipped, using a single spark plug per cylinder.

When first installed in the Sport 2000, the engine produced 290 bhp (220 kW) at 11,500 rpm. Later during the 1969 racing season the engine was further developed and the compression ratio increased to 11.3:1. and could produce 315–320 bhp (235–239 kW) for short bursts and 295 bhp (220 kW) consistently. The engine was specialized for the short courses of the European Hill Climb Championship (where it was extremely successful in 1969) and was not intended for endurance events, although sufficient water and oil cooling systems were incorporated to prevent frequent engine rebuilds.

=== Tipo 001 ===
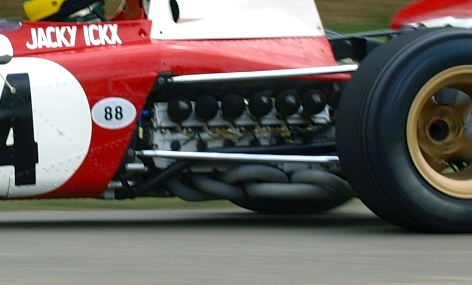
Ferrari Tipo 001 installed in a 312B2

The Tipo 001 was a 3-litre flat-12 used in 312 B Formula One cars and 312 PB sports racing cars between 1970 and 1974. Designed by Mauro Forghieri, this engine was intended to replace the aging Colombo V12 used in the 312 F1 and 312 P sports racing cars. The Tipo 001 was the first Ferrari F1 engine funded by Fiat, after Fiat took a 50% stake in the company in 1969. Fiat's restructuring of the racing program and additional funding led Forghieri to create a new, separate R&D department where the 312 B F1 car and Tipo 001 engine were developed. Forgheri was strongly influenced by the Cosworth DFV V8 engine when designing the Tipo 001, particularly in how the movement of oil inside the crankcase was optimized to reduce oil pumping losses and the design of the combustion chamber.

The overall capacity of the engine was 2,991 cc (182.5 cu in), with a bore and stroke of 78.5 mm x 51.5 mm and a compression ratio of 11.8:1. Later versions used in the 312 B2 and B3 had a bore and stroke of 80 mm x 49.6 mm and a compression ratio of 11.5:1. The aluminum alloy crankcase (with cast iron liners) was made in two pieces, with a vertical split at the center of the case. In order to reduce weight, shot-peened titanium connecting rods were used. The one-piece machined crankshaft ran in four main bearings and was coupled to the flywheel with a rubber coupling (developed by Pirelli) that reduced stress on the crankshaft, preventing breakage. Like the previous Tipo 232, four overhead camshafts were driven by gears and operated two intake and two exhaust valves per cylinder. The included angle between the valves was further reduced to 20°. Lucas indirect fuel injection and single-plug Marelli transistor ignition were equipped. The overall engine height was reduced compared to the earlier Tipo 207 F1 engine and the engine was only 15 kg (33 lb) heavier than the rival Cosworth DFV V8, despite having 4 additional cylinders and larger overall dimensions.

Ferrari initially reported the Tipo 001 produced a power output of 455 bhp (339 kW) at 11,500 rpm, which exceeded the power output of both the earlier 312's V12 and the DFV by almost 20 bhp (15 kW). By the end of the 1970 Formula One season, further development increased the Tipo 001's output to 480 bhp (360 kW) at 12,600 rpm. In its final version in the 1974 312 B3, the engine produced 485 bhp (362 kW) at 12,500 rpm.

Alongside the engine's use in the 312 B F1 cars, a detuned version of the Tipo 001 was used in 1971-1973 312 PB sports racing cars. This version initially produced 440 bhp (330 kW) at 10,800 rpm, increasing in 1973 to 470 bhp (350 kW) at 11,500 rpm.

=== Tipo 015 ===
The 3-liter Tipo 015 flat-12 engine was used in the Ferrari 312 T series of Formula One cars between 1975 and 1980. It was heavily derived from the Tipo 001, but was adapted to fit the 312 T's new transverse gearbox. The overall capacity of the engine was 2,991 cc (182.5 cu in) with a bore and stroke of 80 mm x 49.6 mm and a compression ratio of 11.5:1. The engine's design was continuously improved during its years of competition, including increased use of lightweight magnesium and titanium components and refinements to the cylinder heads, combustion chambers and intake ducting. The first 312 T engines produced approximately 500 bhp (370 kW) at 12,200 rpm. This increased to 510 bhp (380 kW) at 12,200 rpm in the 1978 312 T3 and finally 515 bhp (384 kW) at 12,300 rpm in the 1979 312 T4.

The Tipo 015 was succeeded by the Tipo 021 turbocharged V6 in the 1980 126C. The Tipo 015 was Ferrari's last naturally aspirated engine until 1989.

== Roadgoing engines ==
F102, F110, F113
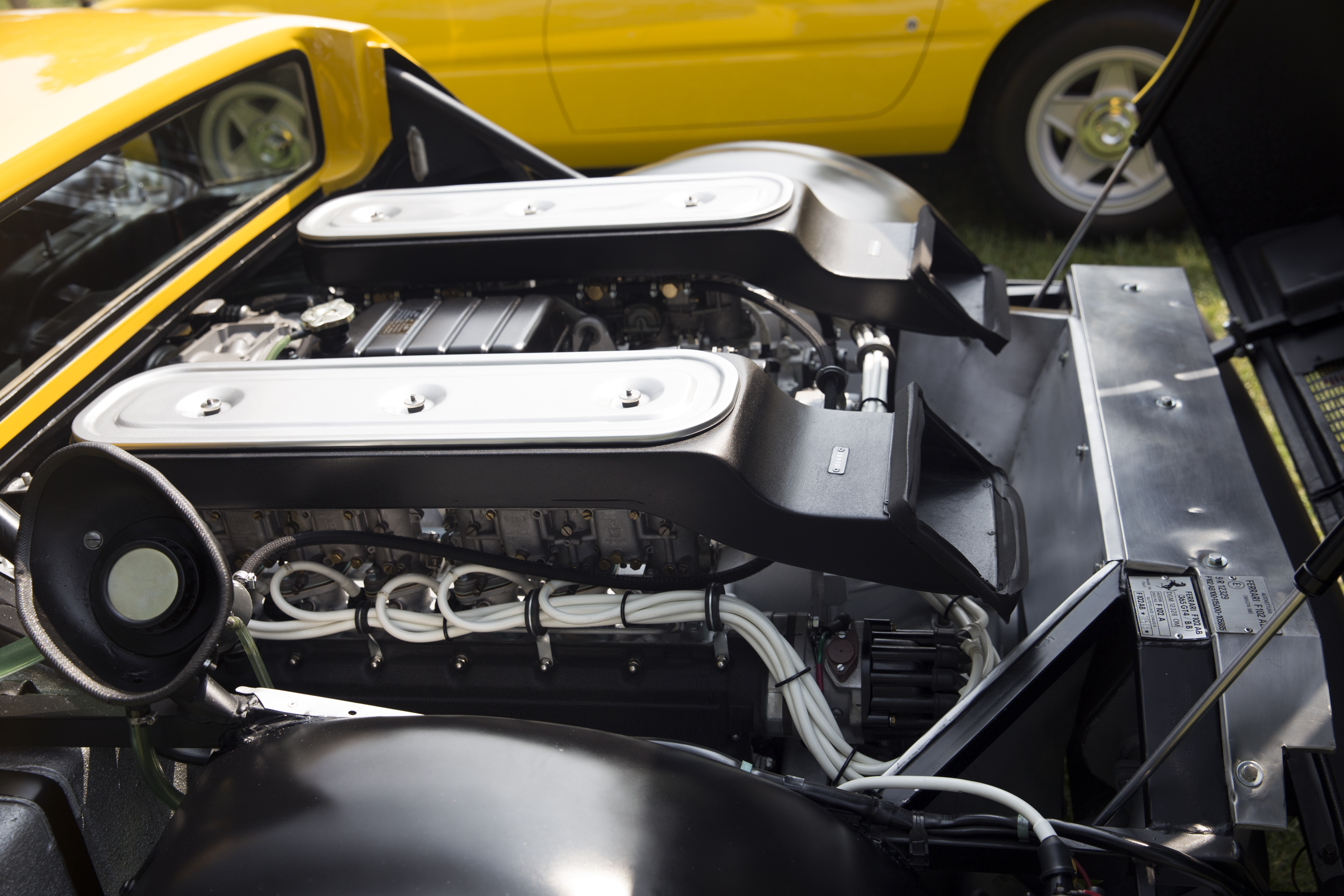
- Ferrari F102 A engine in a 365 GT4 BB

Overview
- Manufacturer: Ferrari
- Designer: Giuliano De Angelis
- Production: 1973–1996

Layout
- Configuration: Flat-12
- Displacement: 4.4 L (270 cu in) (F102A); 4.9 L (300 cu in) (F102B, F110, F113)
- Cylinder bore: 81 mm (3.2 in) (F102); 82 mm (3.2 in) (F102B, F110, F113)
- Piston stroke: 71 mm (2.8 in) (F102); 78 mm (3.1 in) (F102B, F110, F113)
- Cylinder block material: Silumin
- Cylinder head material: Silumin
- Valvetrain: DOHC

Combustion
- Fuel type: Petrol
- Cooling system: Water cooled

Chronology
- Predecessor: Ferrari Colombo engine
- Successor: Ferrari F133 engine

Ferrari introduced a roadgoing flat-12 engine with the 1973 365 GT4 BB. This engine was further developed for use in 512 BB, 512 BBi, Testarossa, 512 TR and F512 M models, remaining in production until 1996.

=== Tipo F102A ===
The Tipo F102A engine was the first flat-12 cylinder configuration fitted in a Ferrari road car, the 1973-1976 365 GT4 BB. Design and development of the new engine was overseen by Ferrari engineer Giuliano de Angelis and Angelo Bellei. The F102A engine's was derived from the Tipo 001 Formula One engine as well as earlier Ferrari Colombo V12 engines. The engine's displacement, bore & stroke, rods and pistons were the same as the Tipo 251 60° V12 Colombo engine powering the 365 GTB/4 Daytona it replaced. The F102A had two valves per cylinder and twin overhead camshafts per bank, although these were now belt driven, instead of by chain as on earlier Ferrari 12-cylinder engines. Belt drive was chosen to reduce noise, improve reliability and reduce manufacturing and servicing costs. The engine fitted with two banks of two triple-choke Weber 40IF3C carburettors and an electronic Magneti Marelli "Dinoplex" ignition system. In contrast to both the Tipo 251 and the Tipo 001, the spark plugs enter the combustion chamber from the top, rather than the sides. The block and cylinder heads were constructed from Silumin light alloy, with Borgo light alloy pistons, shrunk-in cast iron cylinder liners and a cross-plane, forged steel crankshaft. As was standard Ferrari practice, the crankshaft was machined from a single billet of steel, which was aged prior to machining in order to improve structural stability. The engine was lubricated by a wet sump with a capacity of 12 litres (13 US qt) and twin oil filters.

According to de Angelis and Bellei, the first prototype F102 A engine produced 380 bhp (280 kW) at 7,100 rpm and propelled the prototype to 302 km/h (188 mph) during testing. Some Ferrari sales materials quote this 380 bhp figure, while others reported the production version of the F102 A engine produced 360 bhp (268 kW) at 7,500 rpm and 311 ft⋅lb (422 N⋅m) of torque at 4,500 rpm. Figures reported in other factory and press publications vary, with the owner's manual reporting 344 PS (253 kW; 339 hp) at 7200 rpm.

=== Tipo F102B ===
In 1976 Ferrari launched a revised version of the BB, the BB 512. This car was equipped with a Tipo F102B flat-12 engine, based on the preceding F102A but enlarged to 4942 cc. Bore and stroke were now 82 mm x 78 mm and the compression ratio was increased to 9.2:1. Camshaft timing was also altered.

Ferrari initially claimed a peak power output of 360 bhp (270 kW) at 6800 rpm and 331 lb⋅ft (449 N⋅m) of torque. Later Ferrari publications revised this to 340 bhp (250 kW). Despite the loss in peak power, the flatter torque curve of the 4.9 liter engine provided a smoother and more user friendly power delivery. The larger displacement engine also allowed Ferrari to meet more stringent pollution and noise regulations without losing performance. A dry sump lubrication system was now used to prevent oil starvation and surge issues, which were exacerbated by the higher cornering forces generated by the BB 512's wider tires.

The F102B engine was also used in 512 BB LM racing cars. In series 1 cars, the engines were modified with new pistons, camshafts and carburetors, resulting in a power output of approximately 400 bhp (300 kW). Series 2 cars also had a Lucas mechanical fuel injection system, fed by dual Turolla fuel pumps. In this form, the engine generated approximately 475–480 bhp (354–358 kW)

=== Tipo F110A ===
In 1981 the BB 512 was replaced by the BB 512i, powered by the Tipo F110A engine. This engine was based on the F102B but was now equipped with Bosch K-Jetronic fuel injection. It had the same dimensions and overall capacity as the F102B. The fuel injection system allowed Ferrari to meet stricter emissions regulations. Overall power output was now 340 bhp (250 kW) at 6,000 rpm. The Dinoplex electronic ignition system now had a built-in rev limiter that activated at 6,600 rpm.

Ferrari F110 A Engine

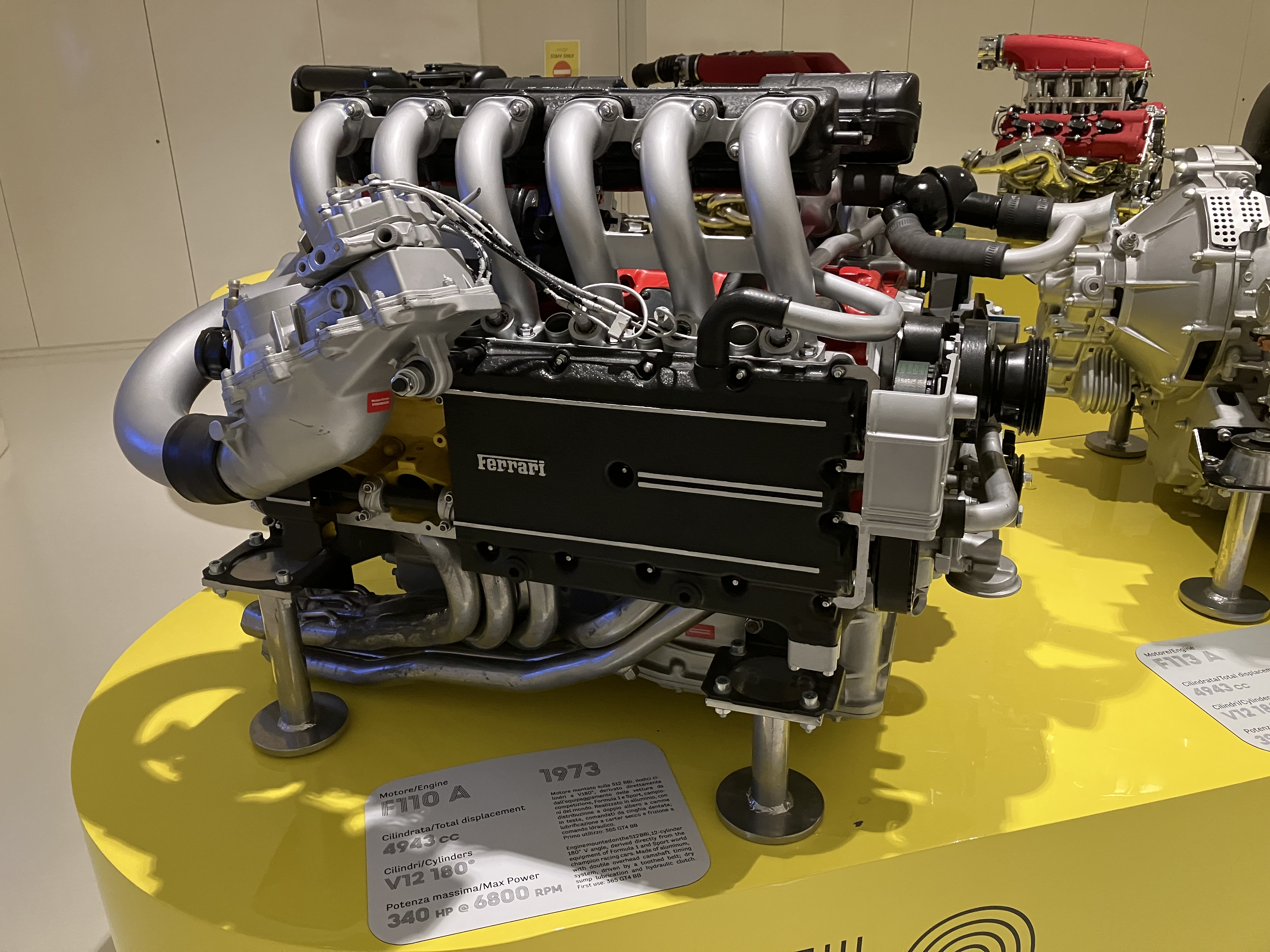
F110 A engine, with Bosch K-Jetronic air/fuel metering unit visible at left

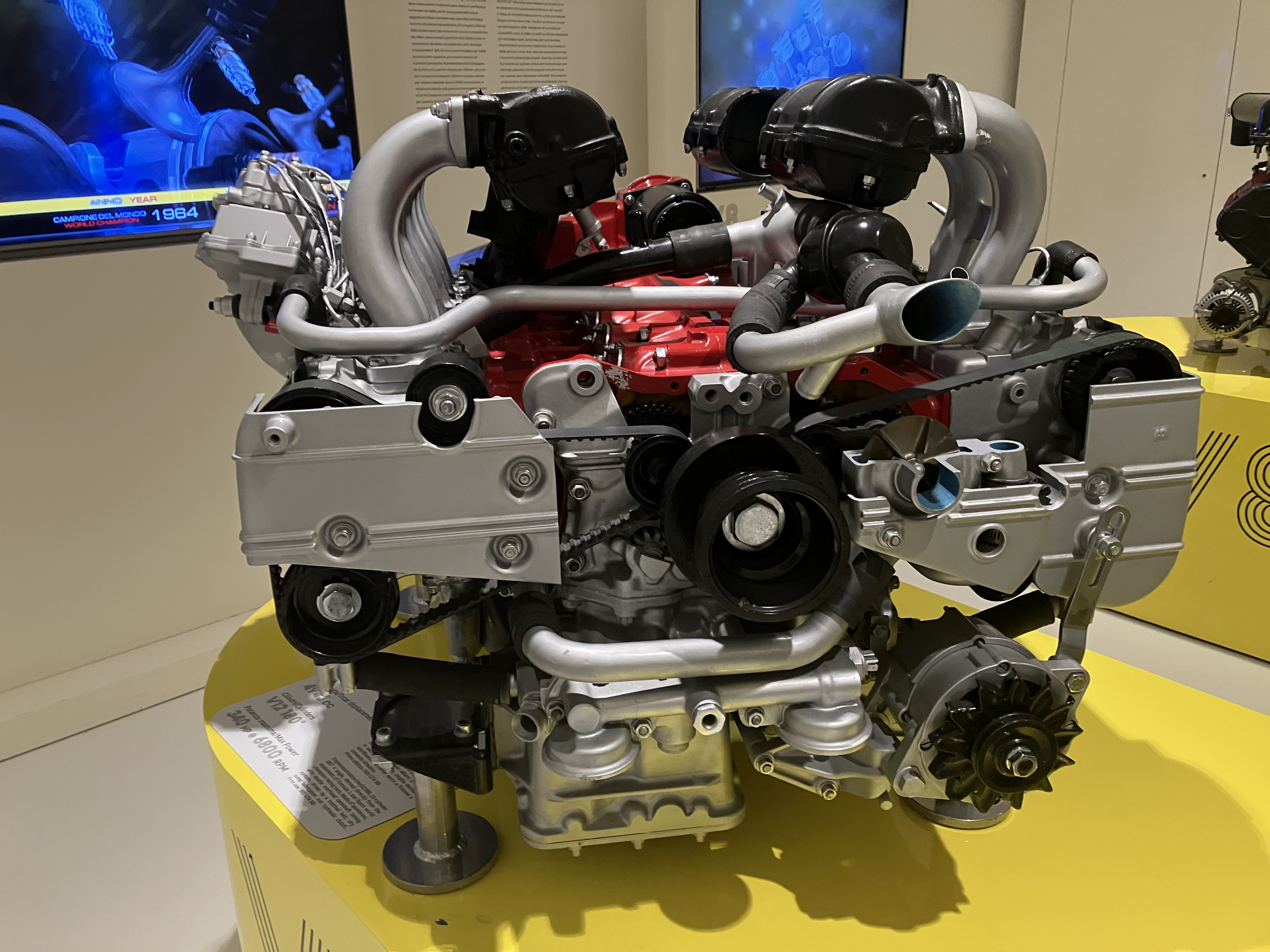
F110 A engine with covers partially cut away to show timing belt arrangement

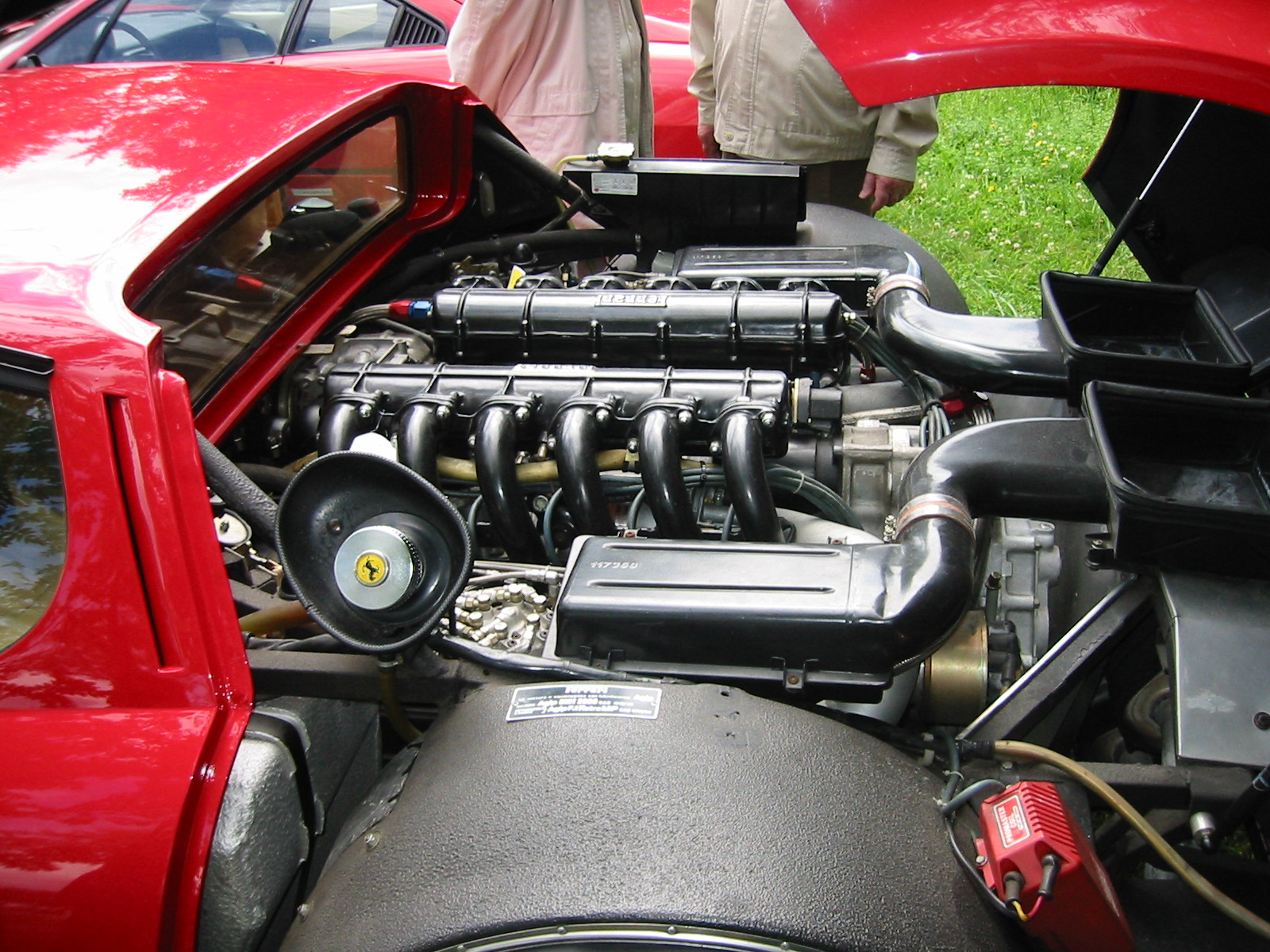
F110 A engine in a BB 512i

=== Tipo F113A/B/D/G ===
The Testarossa was introduced in 1984, replacing the BB 512i. It was equipped with the Tipo F113A engine. This engine was the first roadgoing Ferrari flat-12 engine with four valves per cylinder. The power output was 390 PS (287 kW; 385 hp), making it the most powerful engine mounted on a production sports car at the time of its launch. The bore and stroke and 4942 cc cubic capacity was identical to the preceding F110A engine. The F113A was fitted with a Marelli Microplex MED120 electronic ignition system and Bosch K-Jetronic fuel injection. Export versions for United States, Canada and Japan had catalytic converter and KE-Jetronic fuel injection. European versions got those features in 1986 and the revised engine was known as F113B.

The 1991 512 TR was equipped with the Tipo F113D engine. This was an upgraded version of the F113A in the Testarossa, maintaining the same cubic capacity of 4.9 L. Changes were made to the porting, with redesigned inlet plenums and larger valves providing more efficient fuel/air mix ingress, whilst the fuel injection and ignition system were changed to a combined Bosch Motronic M2.7 system. The engine was further improved with new shallow-skirt pistons and a modified crankshaft design. This engine produced 422 bhp (315 kW) at 6,750 rpm and 362 lb⋅ft (491 N⋅m) at 5,500 rpm.

For the 1994 F512 M the engine was further upgraded and designated Tipo F113G. This engine had a lightened crankshaft, titanium alloy connecting rods, new pistons and a stainless steel low backpressure exhaust system. The compression ratio increased to 10.4:1. The F113G produced 434 bhp (324 kW) at 6,750 rpm.

The flat-12 production ceased with the F512 M, being replaced by the front-engined 550 Maranello which featured the new 65° V12 F133 engine.

Ferrari F113 A Engine

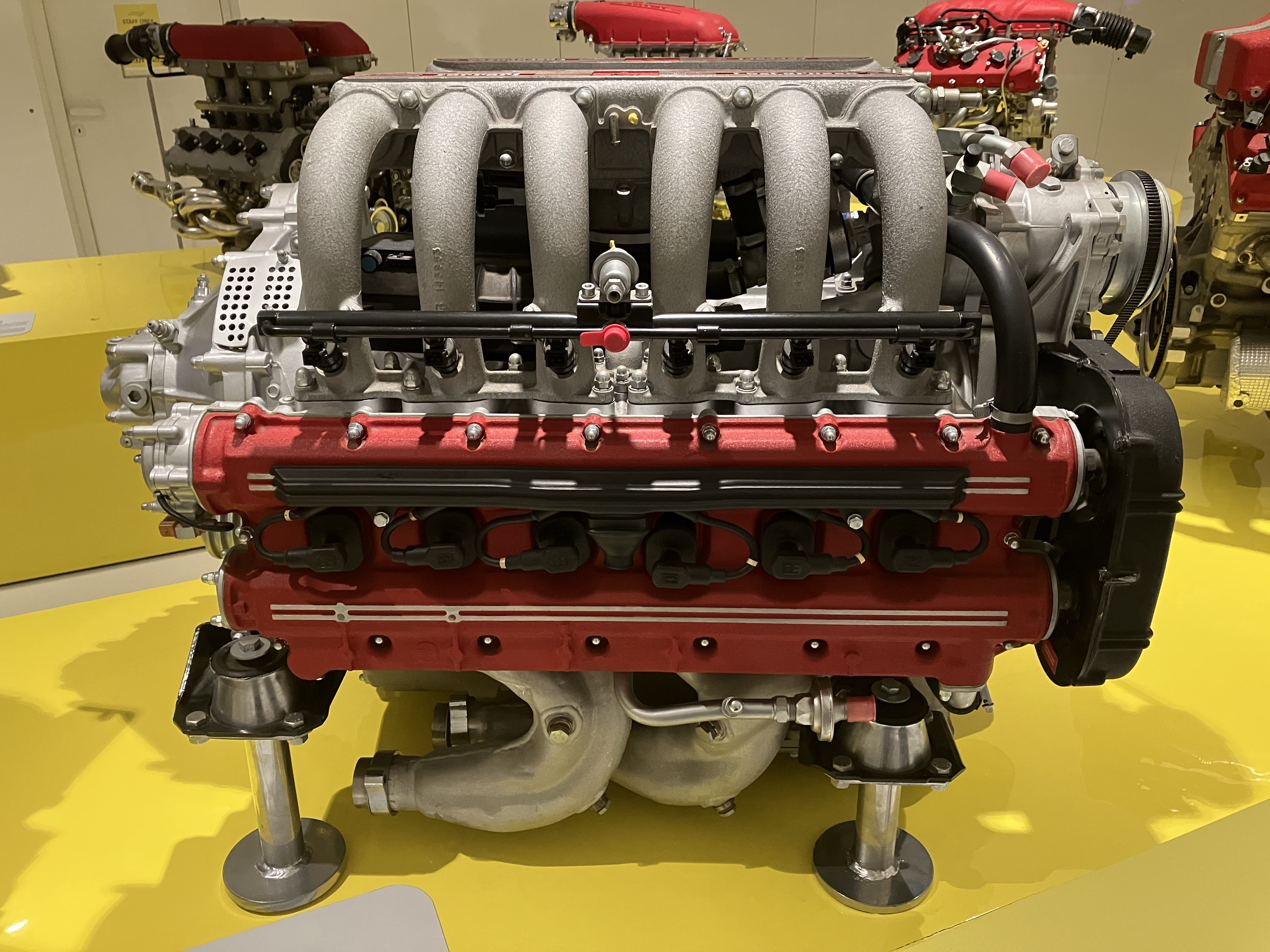
Right side of a F113 A engine

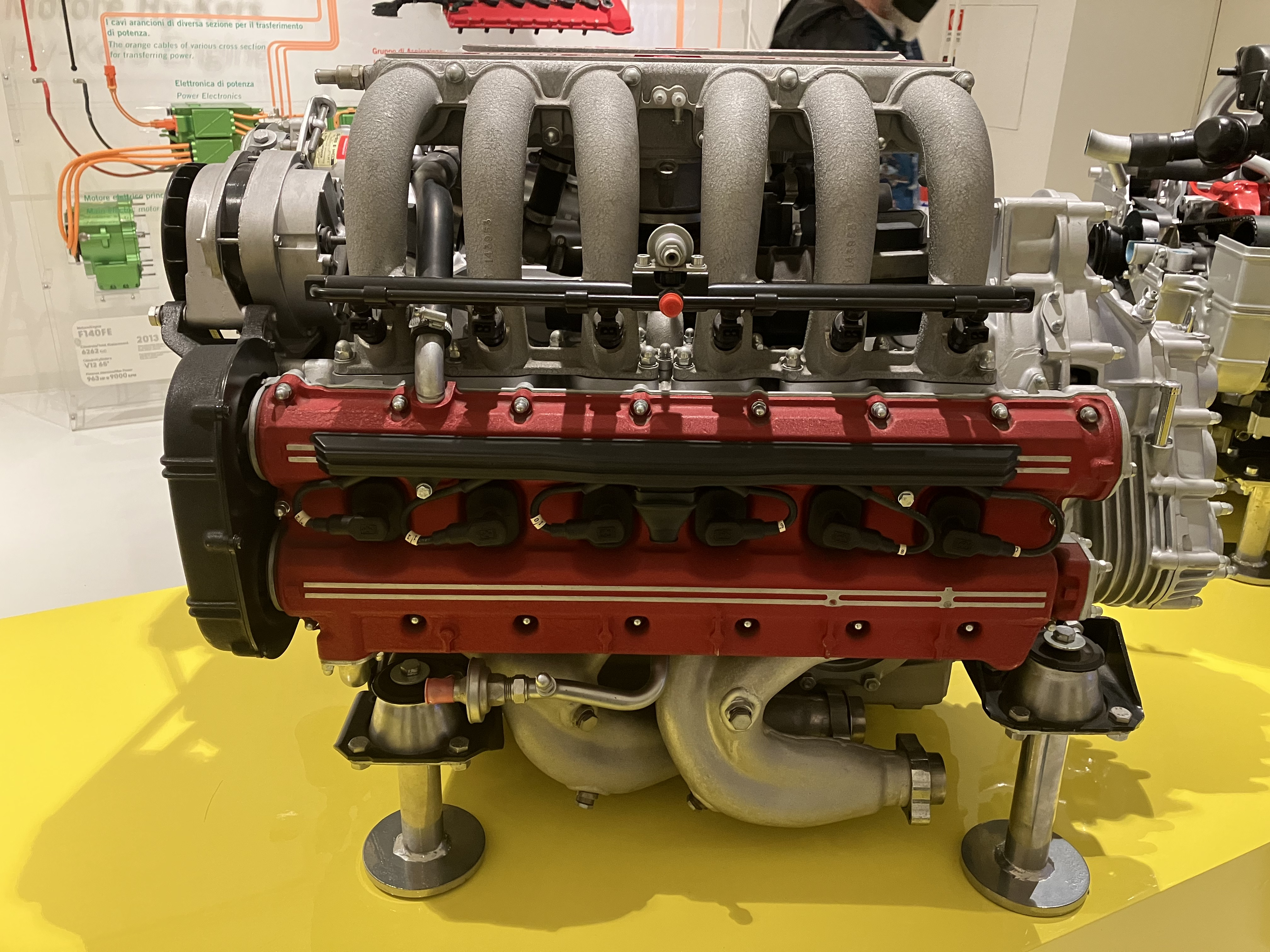
Left side of a F113 A engine

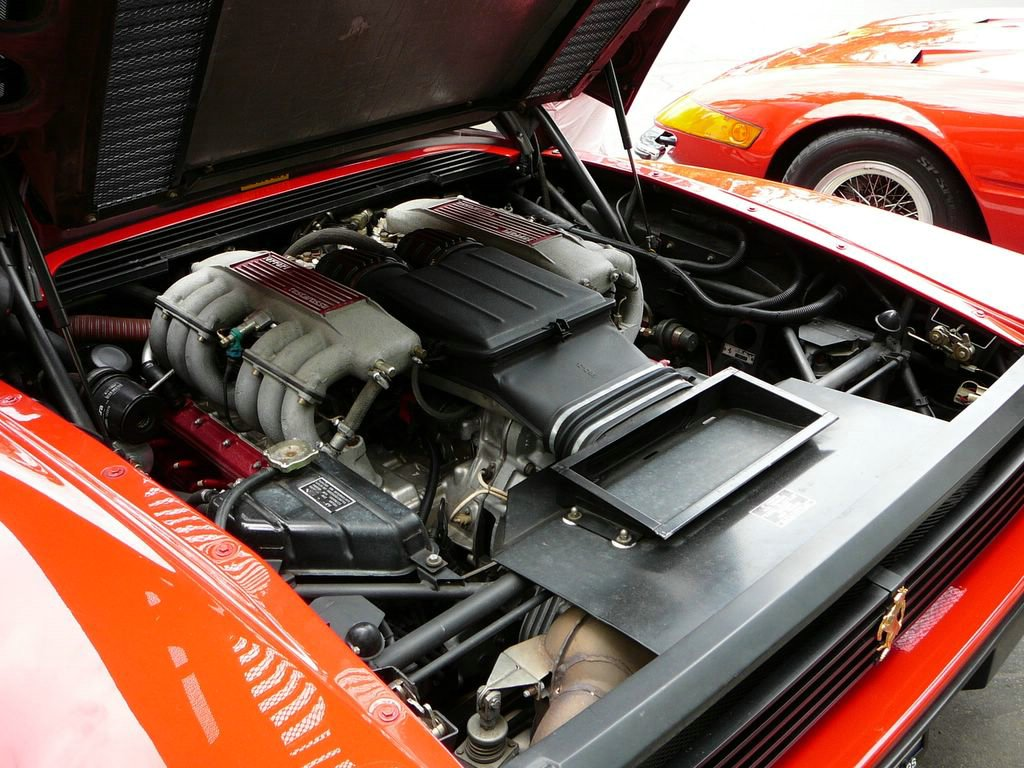
F113 A engine in a Testarossa

== Aircraft engine ==
In the late 1960s, Ferrari was approached by Franklin Engine Company with an order for an engine that could be installed in a small twin-engined aircraft. Mauro Forghieri began adapting a flat-12 engine design for this purpose, as this configuration would fit within a wing. However, the project was quickly cancelled when Franklin entered receivership. Forghieri's design work on the aircraft engine was incorporated into the 1970 Tipo 001 racing flat-12 engine.

== Specifications ==
Eng. code	Displ.	Bore × stroke	Years	Usage	Peak power	Notes
F102 A	4.4 L (4,390 cc)	81 mm × 71 mm (3.2 in × 2.8 in)	1973–1976	365 GT4 BB	344 PS (253 kW; 339 hp) at 7200 rpm	wet-sump, carburettors
F102 B	4.9 L (4,943 cc)	82 mm × 78 mm (3.2 in × 3.1 in)	1976–1981	512 BB	340 PS (250 kW; 340 hp) at 6200 rpm	dry-sump, carburettors
F110 A	4.9 L (4,943 cc)	82 mm × 78 mm (3.2 in × 3.1 in)	1981–1984	512 BBi	340 PS (250 kW; 340 hp) at 6000 rpm	dry-sump, K-Jetronic fuel injection
F113 A	4.9 L (4,943 cc)	82 mm × 78 mm (3.2 in × 3.1 in)	1984–1986	Testarossa (European markets)	390 PS (290 kW; 380 hp) at 6300 rpm	dry-sump, K-Jetronic fuel injection
F113 A 040	4.9 L (4,943 cc)	82 mm × 78 mm (3.2 in × 3.1 in)	1984–1991	Testarossa (North America and Japan)	385 PS (283 kW; 380 hp) at 5750 rpm	dry-sump, KE-Jetronic fuel injection, catalytic converters
F113 B	4.9 L (4,943 cc)	82 mm × 78 mm (3.2 in × 3.1 in)	1986–1991	Testarossa (European markets)	390 PS (290 kW; 380 hp) at 6300 rpm	dry-sump, KE-Jetronic fuel injection, catalytic converters
F113 D	4.9 L (4,943 cc)	82 mm × 78 mm (3.2 in × 3.1 in)	1991–1994	512 TR	428 PS (315 kW; 422 hp) at 6750 rpm	dry-sump, Motronic fuel injection, catalytic converters
F113 G	4.9 L (4,943 cc)	82 mm × 78 mm (3.2 in × 3.1 in)	1994–1996	F512 M	440 PS (320 kW; 430 hp) at 6750 rpm	dry-sump, Motronic fuel injection, catalytic converters

== See also ==
- List of Ferrari engines
