= Ferrari 158 =

Ferrari 158 Ferrari 1512
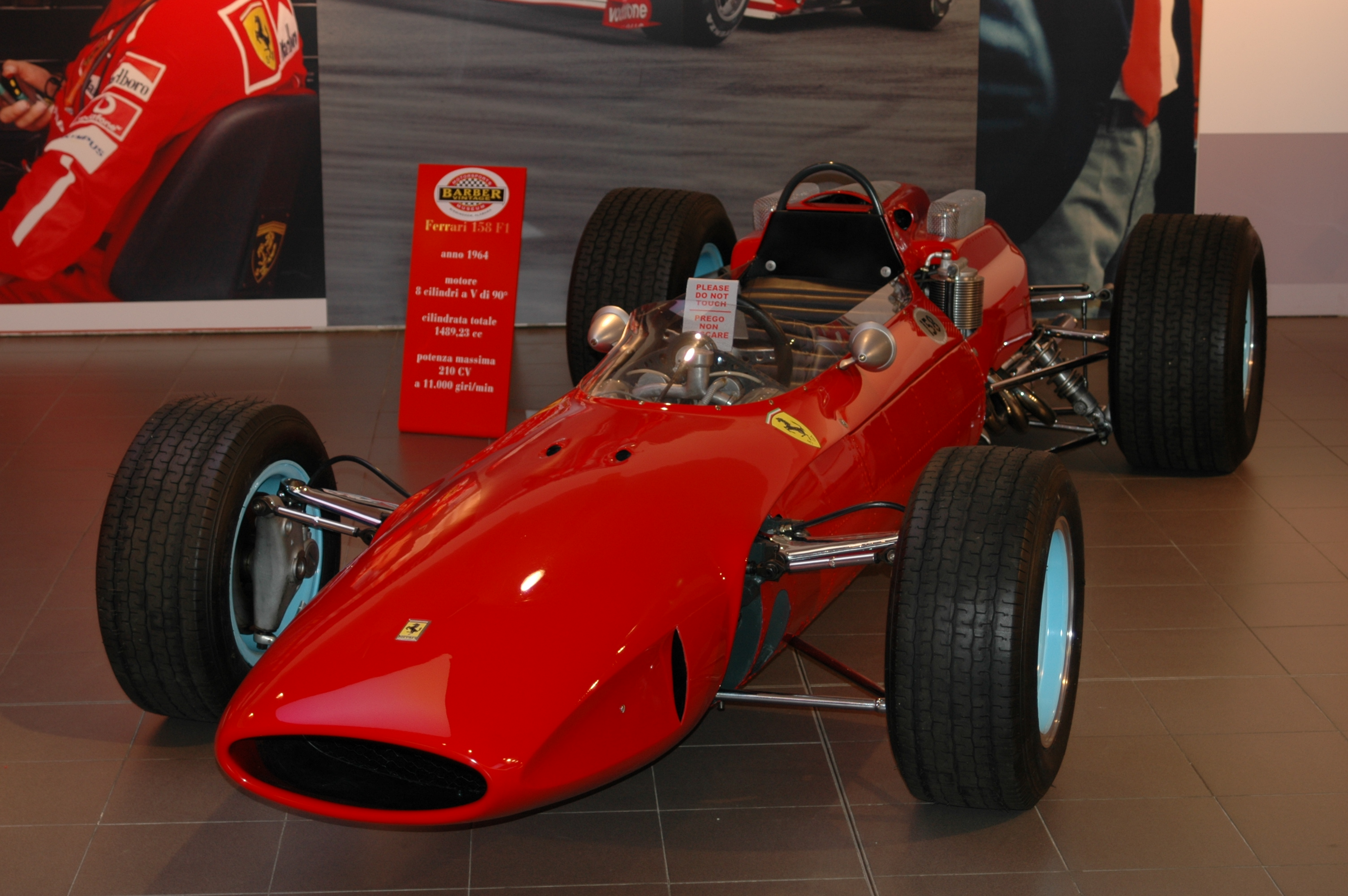
- Category: Formula One
- Constructor: Ferrari
- Designer: Mauro Forghieri
- Predecessor: Ferrari 156 F1
- Successor: Ferrari 246 F1-66

Technical specifications
- Chassis: Type 579, aluminum panels with double wall riveted to a tubular steel structure to form a stress-bearing semi-monocoque
- Suspension (front): Double wishbones, upper rocker arm, lower wishbone, co-axial inboard coil springs and dampers
- Suspension (rear): Upper arm, reversed lower wishbone, co-axial springs/dampers, 2 longitudinal radius arms per side
- Length: 3,950 mm (155.5 in)
- Width: 1,697 mm (66.8 in)
- Height: 768 mm (30.2 in)
- Axle track: 1,350 mm (53.1 in)
- Wheelbase: 2,380 mm (93.7 in)
- Engine: Ferrari Type 205/B, 1,489 cc (90.9 cu in), 90° V8, naturally-aspirated, rear-mounted.
- Transmission: Ferrari Type 543/C, 6-speed manual
- Weight: 468 kg (1,032 lb) (with water and oil)
- Fuel: Shell
- Tyres: Dunlop

Competition history
- Notable entrants: Scuderia Ferrari, North American Racing Team
- Notable drivers: (United Kingdom) John Surtees (Italy) Lorenzo Bandini (Italy) Nino Vaccarella
- Debut: 1964 Monaco Grand Prix
Races	Wins	Poles	F/Laps
20	2	2	2
- Constructors' Championships: 1 (1964)
- Drivers' Championships: 1 (1964 – John Surtees)
- Unless otherwise stated, all data refer to Formula One World Championship Grands Prix only.

The Ferrari 158 was a Formula One racing car made by Ferrari in 1964 as a successor to the V6-powered Ferrari 156 F1.

== Ferrari 158 ==
The 158 was equipped with a 1.5-litre V8 engine, with a bore and stroke of 67.0 mm × 52.8 mm (2.64 in × 2.08 in).

It was the first Ferrari Formula One car to use a monocoque chassis. John Surtees drove the Ferrari 158 to win his only Formula One Drivers' World Championship, in 1964.

Ferrari won the 1964 Formula One World Championship by competing in the last two races in cars painted not in the traditional Rosso corsa but in white and blue. These cars were entered by the factory-supported but unofficial NART team, rather than the Scuderia Ferrari factory team. This was done as a protest concerning arguments between Ferrari and the Automobile Club d'Italia regarding the homologation of a new mid-engined Ferrari race car.

== Ferrari 1512 ==
Ferrari also built a flat-12 powered Formula One car using the same chassis as the 158, designated the Ferrari 1512 or Ferrari 512 F1. The Tipo 207 flat-12 engine was designed by Mauro Forghieri and displaced 1,489.63 cc (90.903 cu in) with a bore and stroke of 56.0 mm × 50.4 mm (2.20 in × 1.98 in). This engine developed 220 PS (162 kW; 217 hp) @ 12,000 rpm compared to the 210 PS (154 kW; 207 hp) @ 11,000 rpm of the 158's V8 engine. This power output made it one of the most powerful 1.5-litre Formula One engines, second to Honda's RA271 V12. A total of three 1512 chassis were produced, numbered 0007, 0008 and 0009.

The 1512, with its larger, more powerful engine, was designed to be competitive on the longest, fastest circuits of the Formula One season, such as Reims, Spa, and Monza. In this role it complemented the lighter, nimbler V8-powered 158 which was more competitive on small, twisty circuits. The 1512 made its racing debut at the 1964 US Grand Prix at Watkins Glen, and raced alongside the 158 during the remainder of 1964 and into 1965.

== Technical data ==
Technical data	158	1512
Engine:	90° 8-cylinder V-engine	180° 12-cylinder V-engine
displacement:	1489 cm^{3}	1490 cm^{3}
Bore x stroke:	67 x 52.8 mm	56 x 50.4 mm
Compression:	10.5:1	9.8:1
Max power at rpm:	210 hp at 11 000 rpm	220 hp at 12 000 rpm
Valve control:	Double Overhead Camshafts per cylinder bank, 2 valves per cylinder	
Fuel system:	Bosch fuel injection	Lucas fuel injection
Gearbox:	5-speed manual	
suspension front:	Double cross links, coil springs	
suspension rear:	Upper transverse link, lower triangle link, double longitudinal links, coil springs, anti-roll bars	
Brakes:	Hydraulic disc brakes	
Chassis & body:	Self-supporting monocoque	
Wheelbase:	238 cm	240 cm
Dry weight:	470 kg	
Dry speed:	270 km/h	

== Gallery ==
- Ferrari 158 chassis with the two different engines
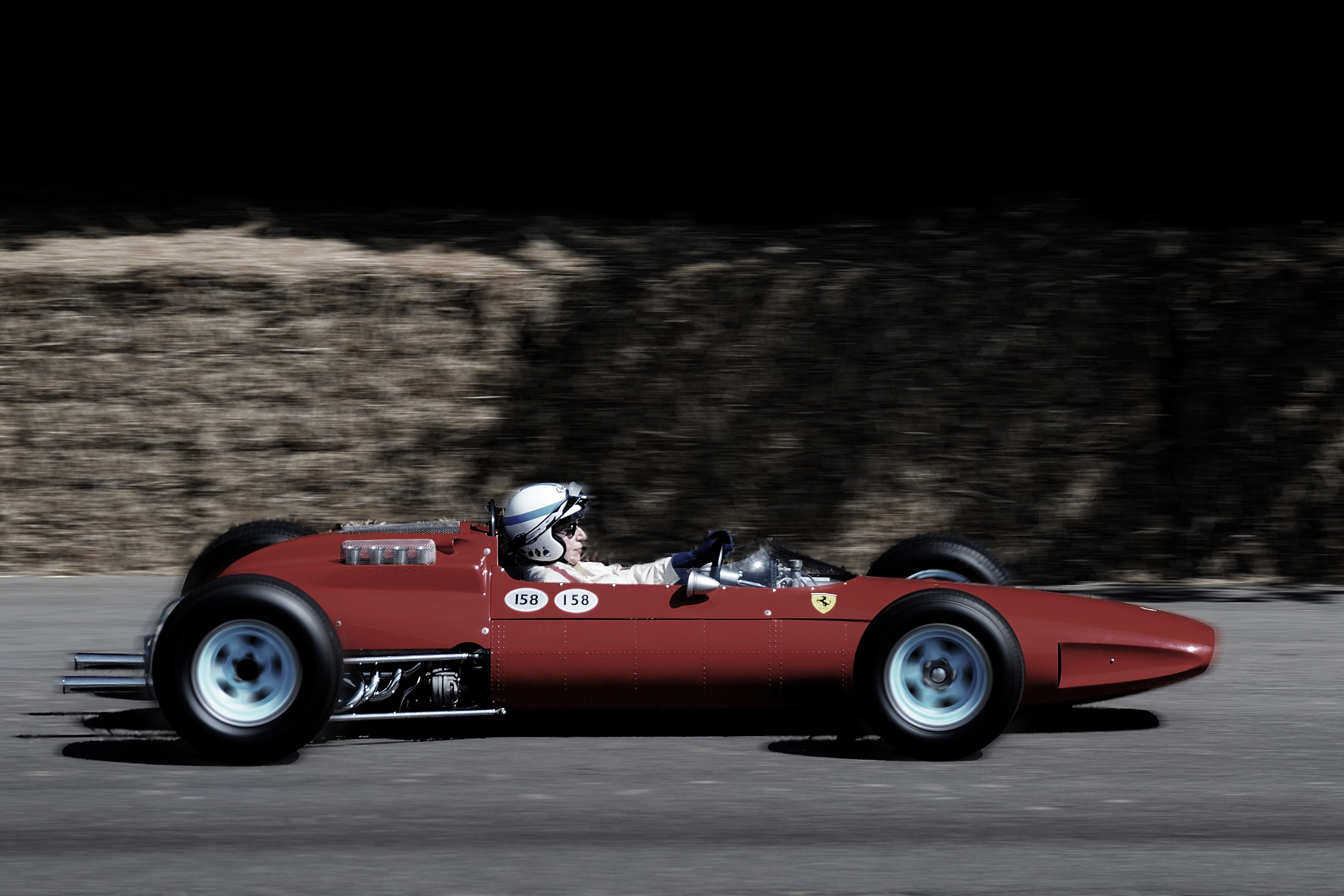
John Surtees drives a Ferrari 158 at Goodwood

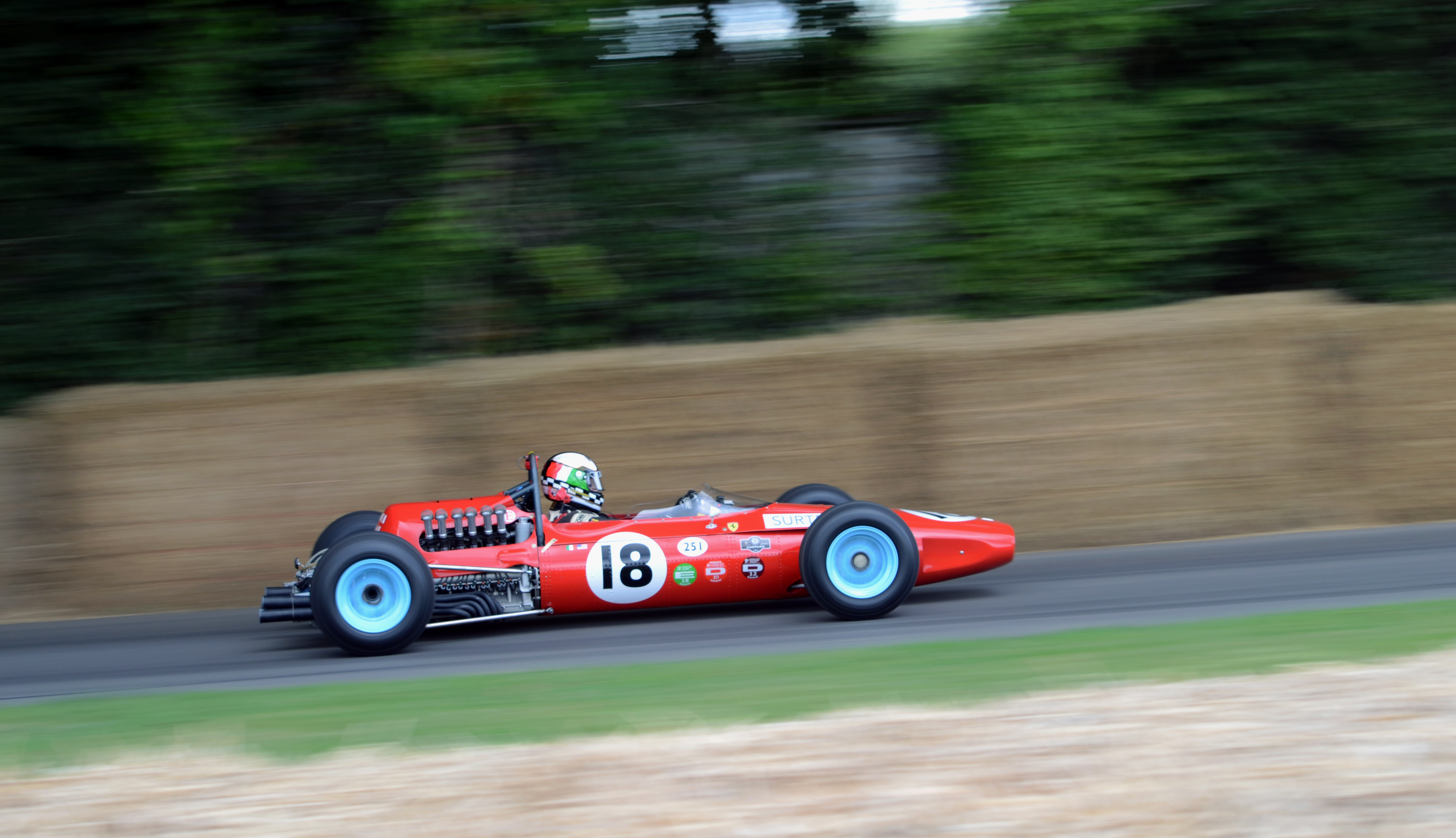
Ferrari 1512 at Goodwood

== Complete Formula One World Championship results ==
(key) (results in bold indicate pole position; results in italics indicate fastest lap)

Year	Entrant	Chassis	Engine	Tyres	Drivers	1	2	3	4	5	6	7	8	9	10	Points	WCC
1964	Scuderia Ferrari SpA SEFAC	158	Ferrari 205/B 1.5 V8	D		MON	NED	BEL	FRA	GBR	GER	AUT	ITA	USA	MEX	45 (49)	1st
1964	Scuderia Ferrari SpA SEFAC	158	Ferrari 205/B 1.5 V8	D	Lorenzo Bandini		Ret	Ret	9				3			45 (49)	1st
1964	Scuderia Ferrari SpA SEFAC	158	Ferrari 205/B 1.5 V8	D	John Surtees	Ret	2	Ret	Ret	3	**1**	Ret	**1**			45 (49)	1st
1964	North American Racing Team	158	Ferrari 205/B 1.5 V8	D	John Surtees									2	2	45 (49)	1st
1964	North American Racing Team	1512	Ferrari 207 1.5 Flat-12	D	Lorenzo Bandini									Ret	3	45 (49)	1st
1965	Scuderia Ferrari SpA SEFAC	158	Ferrari 205/B 1.5 V8	D		RSA	MON	BEL	FRA	GBR	NED	GER	ITA	USA	MEX	26 (27)	4th
1965	Scuderia Ferrari SpA SEFAC	158	Ferrari 205/B 1.5 V8	D	John Surtees	2	4	Ret	3							26 (27)	4th
1965	Scuderia Ferrari SpA SEFAC	1512	Ferrari 207 1.5 Flat-12	D	John Surtees					3	7	Ret	Ret	WD	WD	26 (27)	4th
1965	Scuderia Ferrari SpA SEFAC	1512	Ferrari 207 1.5 Flat-12	D	Lorenzo Bandini	15	2	9	8				4	4	8	26 (27)	4th
1965	Scuderia Ferrari SpA SEFAC	158	Ferrari 205/B 1.5 V8	D	Lorenzo Bandini					Ret	9	6				26 (27)	4th
1965	Scuderia Ferrari SpA SEFAC	158	Ferrari 205/B 1.5 V8	D	Nino Vaccarella								12			26 (27)	4th
1965	Scuderia Ferrari SpA SEFAC	1512	Ferrari 207 1.5 Flat-12	D	Ludovico Scarfiotti								WD			26 (27)	4th
1965	North American Racing Team	1512	Ferrari 207 1.5 Flat-12	D	Pedro Rodriguez									5	7	26 (27)	4th
1965	North American Racing Team	158	Ferrari 205/B 1.5 V8	D	Bob Bondurant									9		26 (27)	4th
