= Ferrari F116/F133 engine =

F116, F133
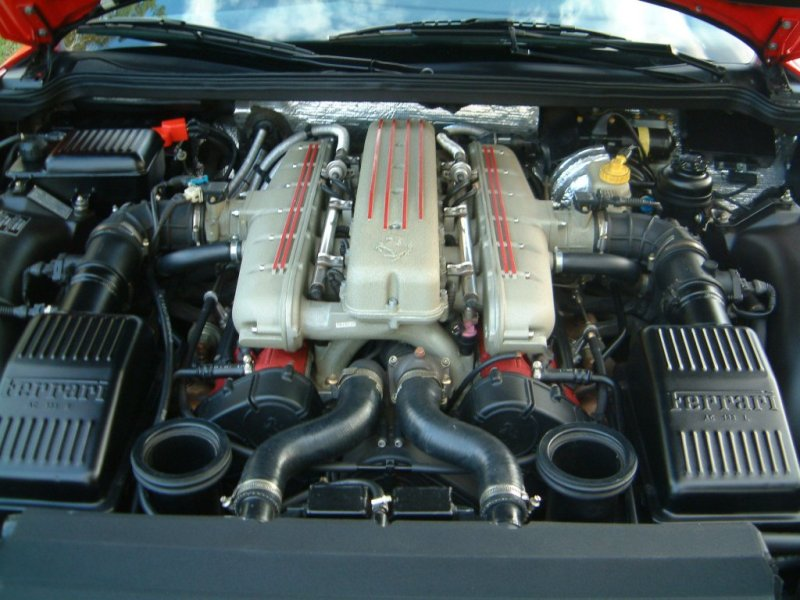
- Ferrari 550 Maranello engine, type F133A

Overview
- Manufacturer: Ferrari
- Production: 1992–2011

Layout
- Configuration: 65° V12
- Displacement: 5.5 L (5,474 cc); 5.7 L (5,748 cc); 6.0 L (5,997 cc)
- Cylinder bore: 88 mm (3.465 in); 89 mm (3.504 in); 90 mm (3.543 in)
- Piston stroke: 75 mm (2.953 in); 77 mm (3.031 in); 78.56 mm (3.093 in)
- Cylinder block material: Aluminium
- Cylinder head material: Aluminium
- Valvetrain: DOHC, 48-valve

Combustion
- Fuel system: Fuel injection
- Fuel type: Petrol
- Cooling system: Water cooled

Chronology
- Predecessor: Ferrari flat-12 engine Ferrari F101 60° V12 engine
- Successor: Ferrari F140 engine

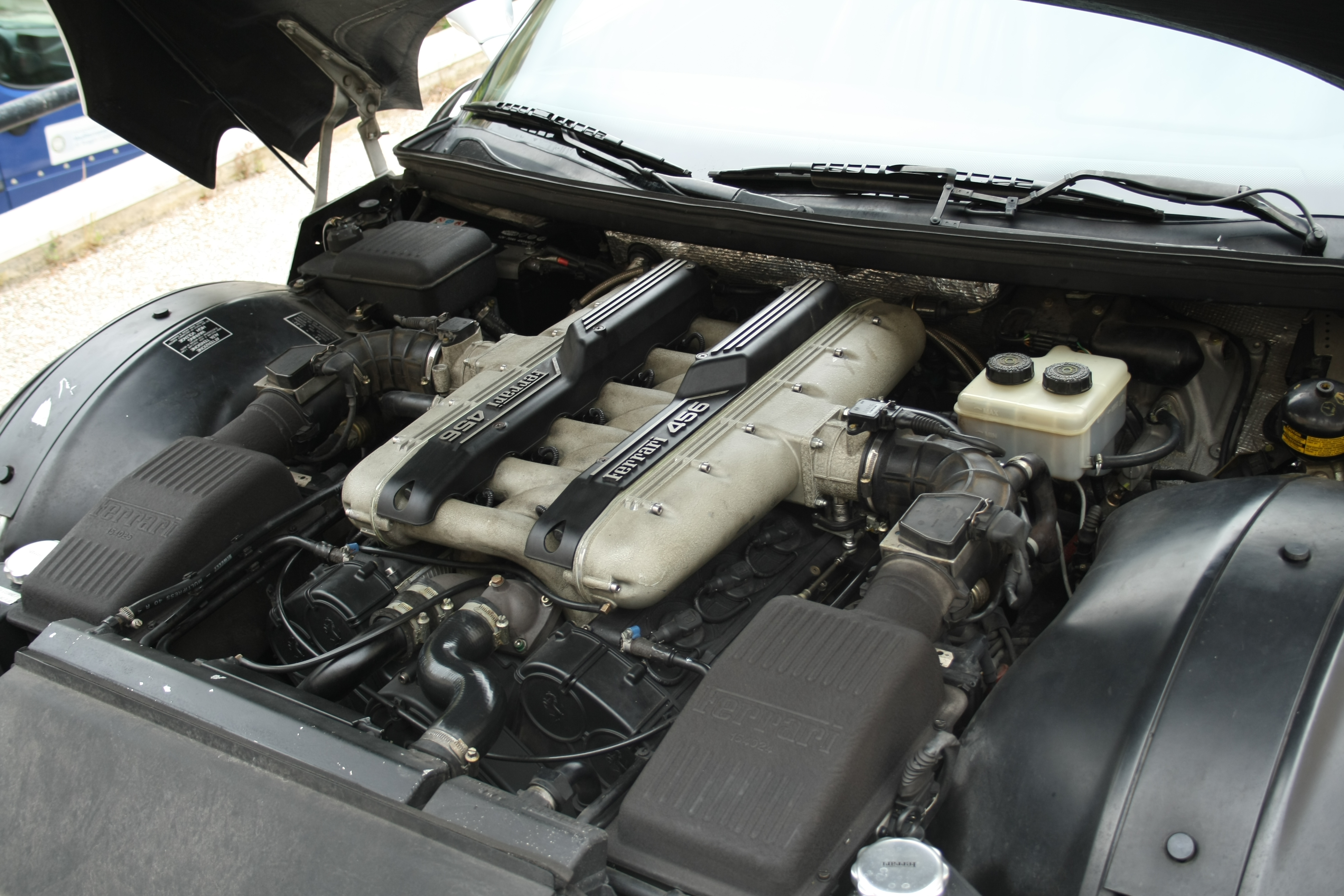
Type F116 engine in Ferrari 456

The F116 engine family is a series of 65° DOHC V12 petrol engines produced by Ferrari between 1992 and 2011. Introduced with the 456 GT, this engine had a displacement of 5.5 L and was a fresh new design which replaced the previous Colombo-derived F101 60° V12 engines used in Ferrari 412 four-seater. A more performant variant named F133 debuted in 1996 with the 550 Maranello, replacing the F113 flat-12 engines.

The production of the F116 ceased in 2003; in the same period the F133's displacement was increased to 5.7 L and lasted until 2011. It was then replaced by the F140 engine family.

All those engines featured dry sump lubrication and 48 valves driven by dual overhead camshafts per bank. The block and cylinder heads were constructed from light alloy, featuring Nikasil treated alloy cylinder liners. A Bosch Motronic 2.7 combined fuel injection/ignition engine management system was initially fitted, superseded by a Motronic 5.2 unit in 1996 and by a Motronic ME7 system for the 5.7 L versions.

== Motorsport ==
Some engineering companies built racing versions based on the F133A engine, without any support from the Ferrari factory. Those engines were used in various 550 GT racecars, most notably the Prodrive-developed 550 GTS who took many victories in the FIA GT Championship, the European Le Mans Series and the 24 Hours of Le Mans.

A factory 6.0 L racing version of the F133 engine was jointly developed by Ferrari and N.Technology for the 575 GTC.

== Applications ==
Eng. code	Displ.	Bore × stroke	Years	Usage	Peak power	Peak torque
F116 B	5.5 L (5,473.91 cc)	88 mm × 75 mm (3.465 in × 2.953 in); 0.46 L (456.16 cc)	1992–1996	Ferrari 456	442 PS (325 kW; 436 hp) at 6250 rpm	550 N⋅m (406 lbf⋅ft) at 4500 rpm
F116 C	5.5 L (5,473.91 cc)	88 mm × 75 mm (3.465 in × 2.953 in); 0.46 L (456.16 cc)	1996–2003	Ferrari 456; Ferrari 456M	442 PS (325 kW; 436 hp) at 6250 rpm	550 N⋅m (406 lbf⋅ft) at 4500 rpm
F133 A	5.5 L (5,473.91 cc)	88 mm × 75 mm (3.465 in × 2.953 in); 0.46 L (456.16 cc)	1996–2001	Ferrari 550 Maranello	485 PS (357 kW; 478 hp) at 7000 rpm	569 N⋅m (420 lbf⋅ft) at 5000 rpm
F133 C	5.5 L (5,473.91 cc)	88 mm × 75 mm (3.465 in × 2.953 in); 0.46 L (456.16 cc)	2000–2001	Ferrari 550 Barchetta Pininfarina	485 PS (357 kW; 478 hp) at 7000 rpm	569 N⋅m (420 lbf⋅ft) at 5000 rpm
F133 E	5.7 L (5,748.33 cc)	89 mm × 77 mm (3.504 in × 3.031 in); 0.48 L (479.03 cc)	2002–2006	Ferrari 575M Maranello	515 PS (379 kW; 508 hp) at 7250 rpm	588 N⋅m (434 lbf⋅ft) at 5250 rpm
F133 F	5.7 L (5,748.33 cc)	89 mm × 77 mm (3.504 in × 3.031 in); 0.48 L (479.03 cc)	2004–2007	Ferrari 612 Scaglietti	540 PS (397 kW; 533 hp) at 7250 rpm	588 N⋅m (434 lbf⋅ft) at 5250 rpm
F133 G	5.7 L (5,748.33 cc)	89 mm × 77 mm (3.504 in × 3.031 in); 0.48 L (479.03 cc)	2005–2006	Ferrari Superamerica	540 PS (397 kW; 533 hp) at 7250 rpm	588 N⋅m (434 lbf⋅ft) at 5250 rpm
F133 H	5.7 L (5,748.33 cc)	89 mm × 77 mm (3.504 in × 3.031 in); 0.48 L (479.03 cc)	2008–2011	Ferrari 612 Scaglietti	540 PS (397 kW; 533 hp) at 7250 rpm	588 N⋅m (434 lbf⋅ft) at 5250 rpm
F133 GT	6.0 L (5,997.33 cc)	90 mm × 78.56 mm (3.543 in × 3.093 in); 0.50 L (499.777 cc)	2003–2005	Ferrari 575 GTC	605 PS (445 kW; 597 hp) at 6300 rpm	730 N⋅m (538 lbf⋅ft) at 5200 rpm

== Awards ==
The 5.5 L variant of the F116/F133 engine family was awarded "Above 4.0-litre" recognition in the 2000 and 2001 International Engine of the Year competition.

== See also ==
- List of Ferrari engines
