= Ferrari F14 T =

Formula One racing car

- Fernando Alonso driving the F14 T at the British Grand Prix
- Category: Formula One
- Constructor: Scuderia Ferrari
- Designers: James Allison (Technical Director); Pat Fry (Engineering Director); Nikolas Tombazis (Chief Designer); Tiziano Battistini (Head of Chassis Design); Simone Resta (Deputy Chief Designer); Fabio Montecchi (Project Leader); Nick Collett (Head of R&D); Giacomo Tortora (Head of Performance Development); Loïc Bigois (Head of Aerodynamics); Dirk de Beer (Chief Aerodynamicist); Rory Byrne (Technical Consultant); Luca Marmorini (Power Unit Director); Mattia Binotto (Deputy Power Unit Director)
- Predecessor: Ferrari F138
- Successor: Ferrari SF15-T

Technical specifications
- Chassis: Carbon fibre and honeycomb structure
- Suspension (front): Independent suspension, pull rod-activated torsion springs
- Suspension (rear): Independent suspension, pull rod-activated torsion springs
- Engine: Ferrari Tipo 059/3 1.6 L (97.6 cu in) V6 turbocharged, 15,000 RPM limited with ERS, Middle
- Electric motor: KERS, ERS, MGU-H and MGU-K
- Transmission: Bespoke 8-speed semi-automatic 8- speed forward + reverse semi-automatic sequential electronically-controlled gearbox, quick-shift, with servo-controlled hydraulic limited-slip differential
- Power: 600hp of V6 engine + 120kW of KERS
- Weight: 691 kg (1,523.4 lb) (with driver)
- Fuel: Shell V-Power
- Lubricants: Shell Helix Ultra
- Tyres: Pirelli P Zero (dry), Cinturato (wet)

Competition history
- Notable entrants: Scuderia Ferrari
- Notable drivers: 7. (Finland) Kimi Räikkönen; 14. (Spain) Fernando Alonso
- Debut: 2014 Australian Grand Prix
- Last event: 2014 Abu Dhabi Grand Prix
Races	Wins	Podiums	Poles	F/Laps
19	0	2	0	1

The Ferrari F14 T (also known by its internal name, Project Code 665) is a Formula One racing car used by Ferrari to compete in the 2014 Formula One season. It was driven by former World Drivers' Champions Fernando Alonso and Kimi Räikkönen, who came from a two-year stint at Lotus Renault to rejoin the team after a five-year absence. The F14 T was designed to use Ferrari's new 1.6-litre V6 turbocharged engine, the 059/3, replacing the 2.4 litre V8 from the F138. The name of the car was chosen by fans in a poll organised by Ferrari. The "14" represents the year of competition, and the "T" reflects the series' shift to a turbocharged engine formula.

== Development ==
The chassis was designed by James Allison, Pat Fry, Nikolas Tombazis and Loïc Bigois with Rory Byrne serving a design consultant and Luca Marmorini leading the powertrain design.

The F14 T was the first turbo powered Formula One car for Ferrari since the Gustav Brunner designed F1/87/88C driven by Michele Alboreto and Gerhard Berger in 1988. Even with the lineup of Alonso and Räikkönen, the car was not successful, scoring only two podium finishes (both by Alonso) in the entire season. It was also the first Ferrari machine since the Ferrari F93A, from 1993, that failed to score at least one Grand Prix win. Many technical changes were made, with the KERS and ERS systems working with the 1.6 litre V6 turbocharged engine, an 8-speed gearbox and a more powerful DRS system.

== Design ==
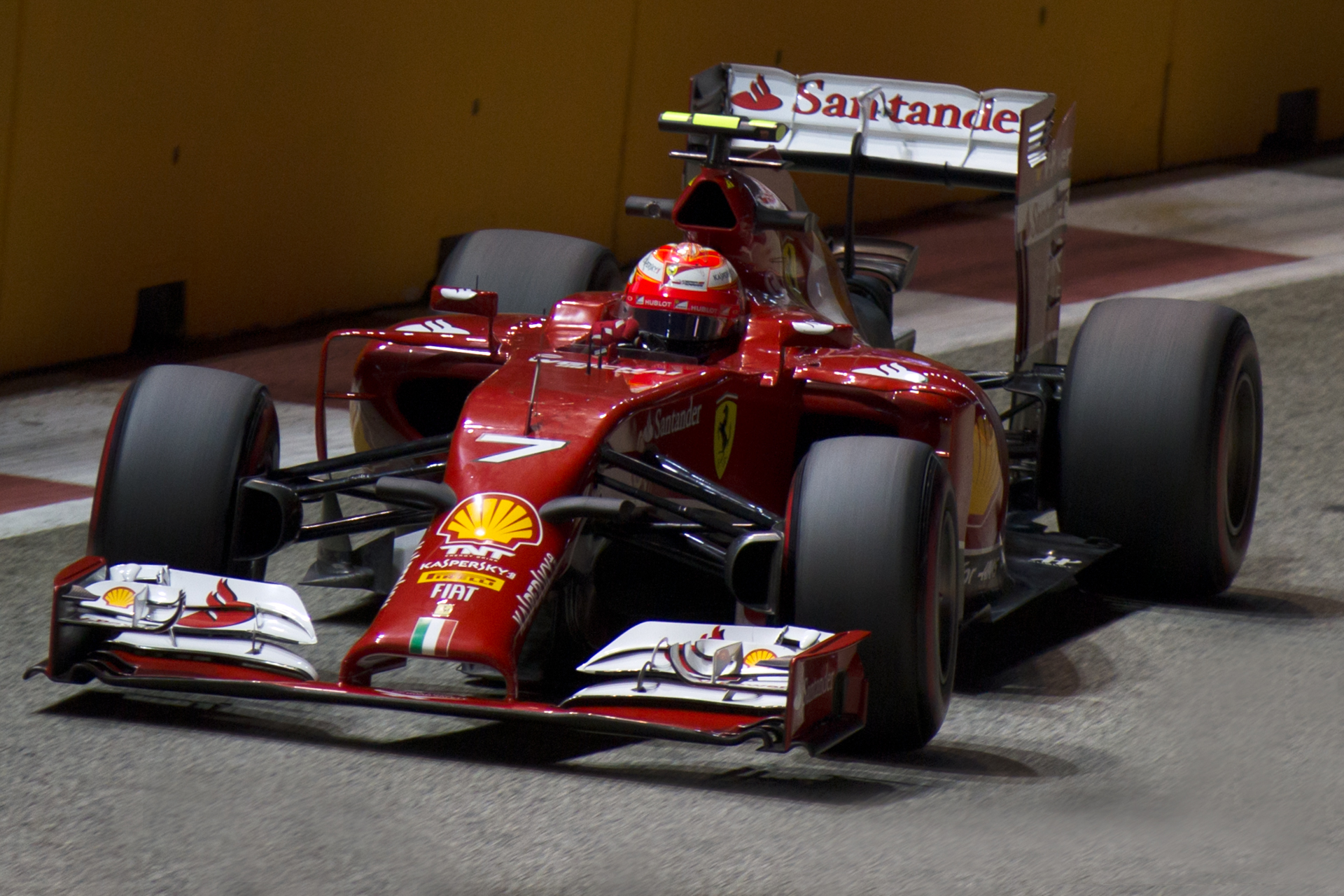
Kimi Räikkönen driving the F14 T at the Singapore Grand Prix

The F14 T was unveiled on 25 January 2014. Like all 2014 Formula One cars, the F14 T featured a lower nose, with a flatter concept compared to other 2014 cars. Ferrari retained their pullrod front suspension, despite reports that it would be dropped. The rear was revised to accommodate the new powerplant and rear wing rules.

== Sponsorship and livery ==
Compared to the stylistic canons of the Maranello single-seaters, the livery of the F14 T shows, combined with the historic racing red, a wider use of black, which this season, in addition to touching the lower part of the car as already happened on the F138, now also covers the entire rear area; the use of this color has a dual function, that is, both to improve the readability of the technical sponsors' brands, and to hide from view the technical solutions adopted by Ferrari in this area of the car.

The two red and black sections of the bodywork are also separated by a thin tricolour stripe. White inserts are finally the prerogative of the front wing as well as the flow deviators located in front of the side pods.

== In video games ==
The Ferrari F14 T was a playable vehicle in F1 2014, F1 2015 (via its 2014 season mode) and Real Racing 3 as part of the "Scuderia Ferrari Update".

== Complete Formula One results ==
(key) (results in italics indicate fastest lap)

Year	Entrant	Engine	Tyres	Drivers	Grands Prix																			Points	WCC
Year	Entrant	Engine	Tyres	Drivers	AUS	MAL	BHR	CHN	ESP	MON	CAN	AUT	GBR	GER	HUN	BEL	ITA	SIN	JPN	RUS	USA	BRA	ABU‡	Points	WCC
2014	Scuderia Ferrari	Ferrari 059/3	P	Kimi Räikkönen	7	12	10	8	7	12	10	10	Ret	11	6	4	9	8	12	9	13	7	10	216	4th
2014	Scuderia Ferrari	Ferrari 059/3	P	Fernando Alonso	4	4	9	3	6	4	6	5	6	5	2	7	Ret	4	Ret	6	6	6	9	216	4th

‡ — Teams and drivers scored double points at the Abu Dhabi Grand Prix.
