= Ferrari F138 =

Formula One racing car

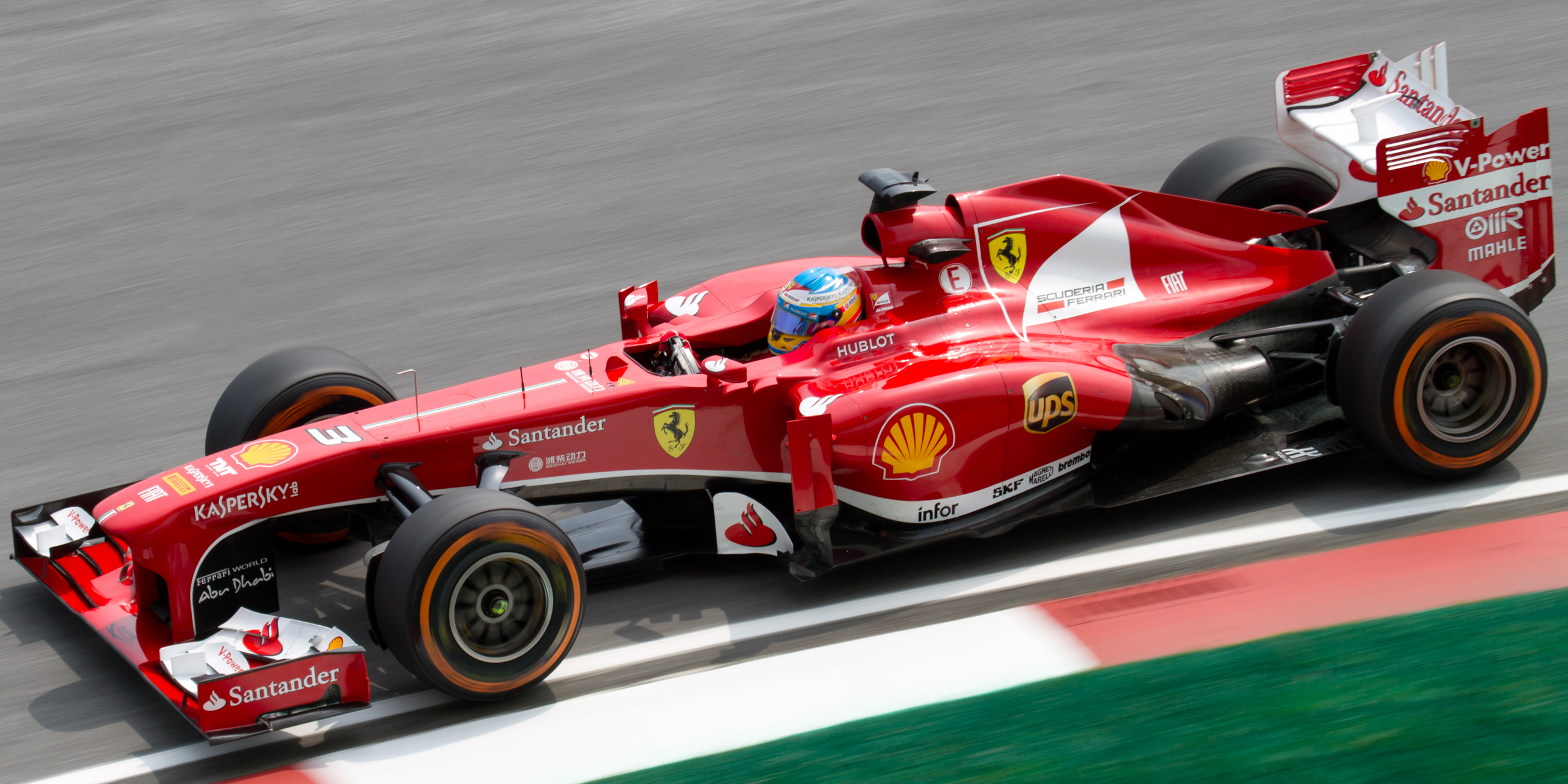
- Fernando Alonso driving the F138 at the Malaysian Grand Prix
- Category: Formula One
- Constructor: Ferrari
- Designers: Pat Fry (Technical Director); Nikolas Tombazis (Chief Designer); Tiziano Battistini (Head of Chassis Design); Simone Resta (Project Leader); Nick Collett (Head of R&D); Giacomo Tortora (Head of Performance Development); Loïc Bigois (Head of Aerodynamics); Nicolas Hennel (Chief Aerodynamicist); Luca Marmorini (Engine and Electronics Director); Guido di Paola (Engine Chief Designer)
- Predecessor: Ferrari F2012
- Successor: Ferrari F14 T

Technical specifications,
- Chassis: Carbon fibre and honeycomb composite structure
- Suspension (front): Independent suspension, pull-rod activated torsion springs
- Suspension (rear): as front
- Engine: Ferrari Tipo 056-2013 2,398 cc (146 cu in) 90° V8 Naturally aspirated, 18,000 RPM limited with KERS, mid-mounted.
- Transmission: Ferrari 7 forward + 1 reverse Semi automatic sequential electronically controlled gearbox, quick-shift Limited-slip differential
- Weight: 642 kg (1,415 lb) (including water, lubricant and driver)
- Fuel: Shell V-Power Fuel; Shell Helix Ultra Lubricant
- Tyres: Pirelli P Zero (dry), Cinturato (wet); OZ Wheels (front and rear): 13"

Competition history
- Notable entrants: Scuderia Ferrari
- Notable drivers: 3. (Spain) Fernando Alonso; 4. (Brazil) Felipe Massa
- Debut: 2013 Australian Grand Prix
- First win: 2013 Chinese Grand Prix
- Last win: 2013 Spanish Grand Prix
- Last event: 2013 Brazilian Grand Prix
Races	Wins	Podiums	Poles	F/Laps
19	2	10	0	2

The Ferrari F138 (originally known as the Ferrari F2013, and sometimes referred to by its project number, the Ferrari 664) is a Formula One racing car designed and built by Scuderia Ferrari for use in the 2013 Formula One season. It was driven by two time World Champion Fernando Alonso and his teammate Felipe Massa in his final season at the Scuderia. The chassis was designed by Pat Fry, Nikolas Tombazis and Loic Bigois with Luca Marmorini leading the engine and electronics design. The car was named the "F138" to represent the year that it would be raced, 2013, and to mark the final season that Formula One would use V8 engines.

Ferrari were developing their car for the 2014 season in parallel with the F138.

== Season summary ==
As winter testing had suggested, the F138 immediately proved to be much more competitive than the F2012 at the start of the season. In Australia, Massa and Alonso qualified 4th and 5th, respectively. In the race, the F138 had better race pace than its rivals so they finished with Alonso taking second place and Massa 4th.

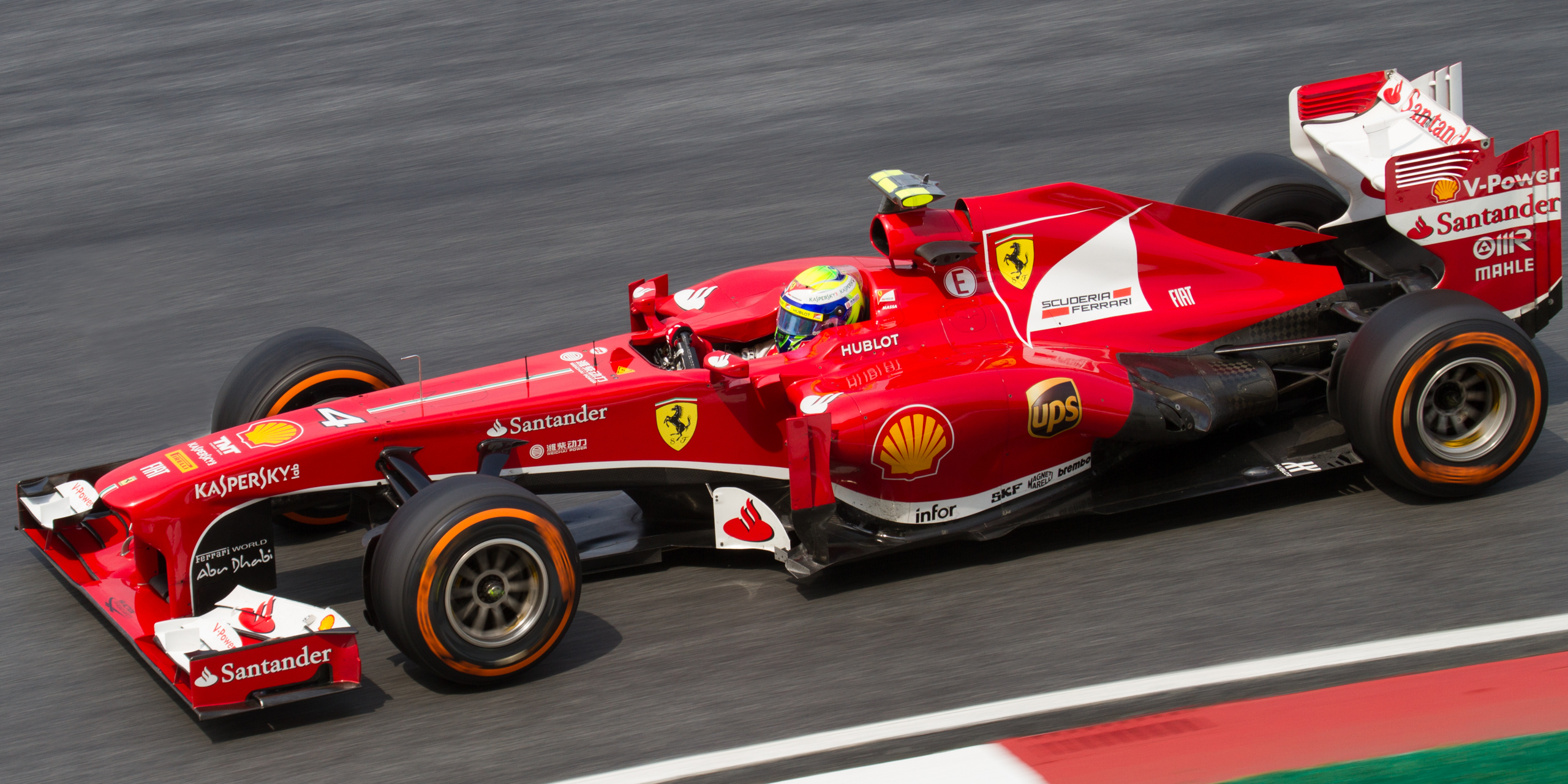
Felipe Massa during the Malaysian Grand Prix

Malaysia also saw the qualifying taking place in wet weather; Massa and Alonso took advantage of this situation to qualify 2nd and 3rd respectively. This was the fourth straight time that Massa had out-qualified his teammate.

The race was started on intermediates because of wet track conditions. Off the line Alonso had a good start while Massa was suffering from degradation on his intermediate tyres, due to which he lost couple of places at the start. Alonso had a slight contact with Vettel going into turn 2 enough to damage his front wing. The team decided to keep Alonso out thinking that the wing would hold up and they could change it when he comes to pit for dry tyres. At the start of lap 2 the wing gave way on the back straight and Alonso ended up retiring in the gravel. Massa had a good race pace on dry weather tyres which helped him to end up in fifth position.

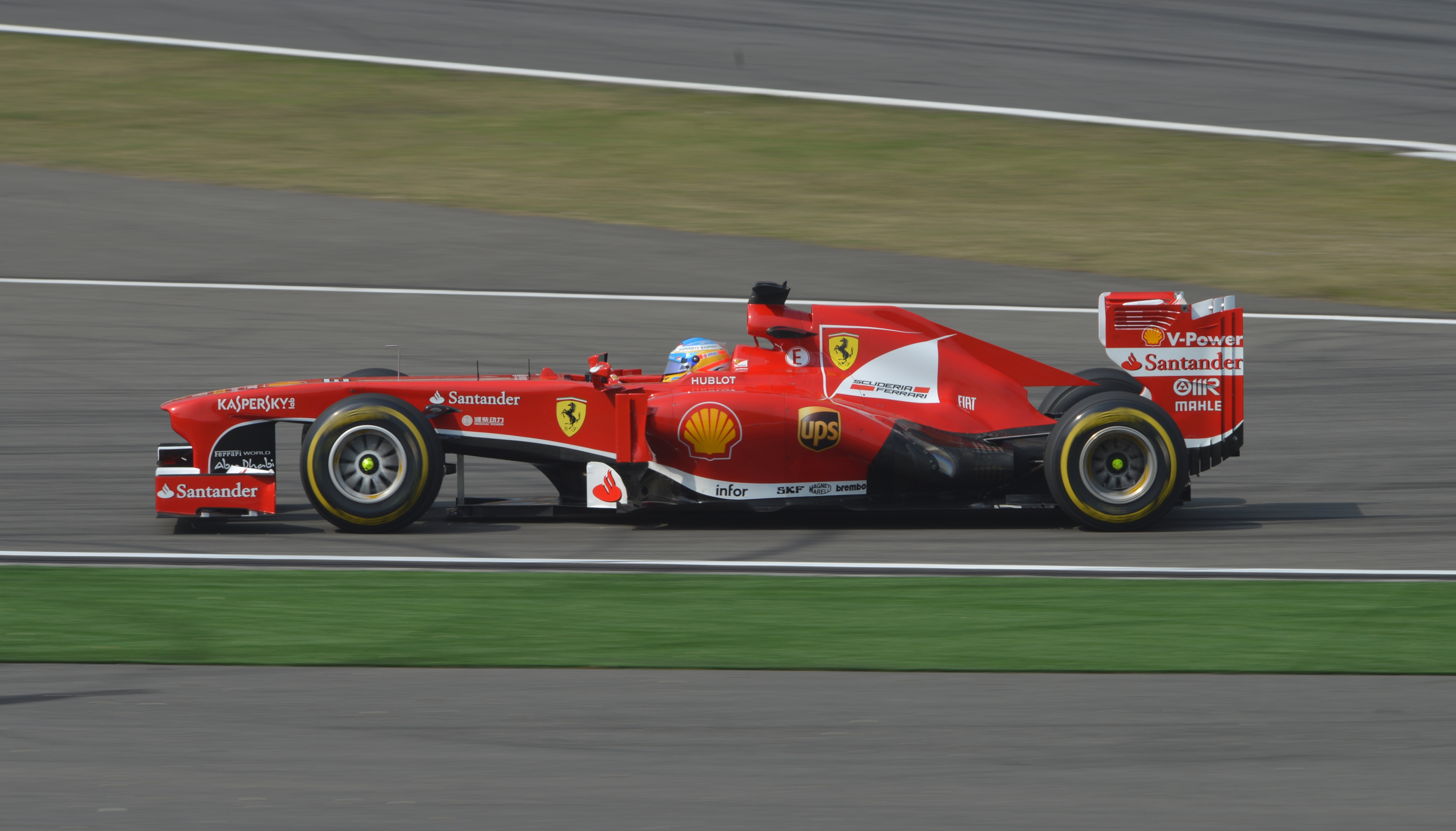
Fernando Alonso took his 31st Grand Prix victory at the Chinese Grand Prix

In China, Ferrari brought upgrades for the F138 which had varied effects. However, during practice sessions it appeared that the F138 had improved single lap pace, compared to the first two rounds of 2013. Alonso and Massa managed to qualify 3rd and 5th. In the race, within five laps both Alonso and Massa managed to overtake Hamilton for first and second place until both swapped for prime tyres from where on Alonso managed to hold his lead but Massa struggled for pace and slid down the order. Alonso went on to take his and the F138's first win of the season, while Massa finished in 6th. Ferrari were pleased with the F138's race pace and Alonso admitted to having withheld his car's full pace during the race.

In Bahrain, the F138 received more improvements to the car's aero package. Alonso qualified 3rd and Massa managed 6th on the harder tyre compound, thus splitting race strategy between both cars. In the race, Alonso dropped down the order due to a repeated malfunction of his DRS while Massa picked up two punctures, resulting in finishes of 8th and 15th respectively.

In Spain, both F138s seemed highly competitive during practice sessions but that did not transfer into a much improved single lap pace during qualifying, relative to other teams. Alonso qualified 5th and Massa posted the 6th best time, however, Massa was relegated to 9th due to having impeded Webber's flying lap during the qualifying session. In the race, Ferrari went for a four pit-stop strategy for both cars which was the optimal strategy for a sustained pace and reasonable tyre conservation for the F138. Having passed Räikkönen and Hamilton impressively in the third corner of the first lap, Alonso dominated the race and took his second win of the season while Massa finished in 3rd.

During the weekend in Monaco, once again both Ferraris seemed reasonably competitive during free practice sessions despite Massa's crash into a barrier during FP3 after hitting a bump on the track before the entry into the first corner. In qualifying, Alonso, however, managed only the 6th best time while Massa did not compete at all due to the team not managing to repair the car on time which resulted in him having to start 23rd. During the course of the race, the F138s clearly lacked pace, compared to that of the Mercedes and Red Bull cars. Moreover, Alonso could not keep up with the top four cars during the middle part of the race due to having debris stuck under the front of his car, hampering the aerodynamic performance of the F138. Meanwhile, Massa struggled to fight his way through the rear of the field until crashing into the same barrier as in FP3 due to a damaged suspension, as confirmed by Ferrari. Alonso thus finished in 7th, having been passed along the way by Sutil and Button but gaining places because of a retirement from Pérez and a puncture for Räikkönen that was caused by Pérez. Overall, the race was a disappointment for the Ferrari F1 team as the car struggled on a high downforce track. Despite that, Ferrari remained adamant that this drop in form was an exception due to the Monaco track's unique characteristics.

In Canada, the Ferraris seemed unable to challenge the Red Bull or Mercedes cars for high grid positions in qualifying but, as usual, they recorded decent race pace. In qualifying, Alonso managed a distant 6th but Massa crashed his F138 on the entry into the third corner in Q2, resulting in a grid position of 16th. Driver error was blamed in the incident as the chassis Massa used was brand new following the Monaco incident. During the race, both Alonso and Massa made up several places to finish in 2nd and 8th respectively.

In Britain, both F138s struggled from the outset in free practice with both cars challenging only for the middle of the field positions. Ferrari admitted lack of pace due to several failed upgrade packages, and Alonso publicly encouraged the team to improve the car's pace as soon as possible. The Ferraris had a disastrous qualifying with Alonso achieving 10th and Massa recording only the 12th fastest time. However, both were promoted one place after di Resta received a penalty for his combined driver-car mass being underweight. In the race, Massa made a remarkable start to charge up to 5th while Alonso improved his grid position more gradually. The race was marked by severe tyre exposure to high stress in the fast sweeping corners with high kerbs on the sides which caused cuts and deformations of tyres. During the race, four cars suffered left rear tyre explosions, one of them being Massa who managed to recover from the back of the field to 6th at the finish. Alonso, meanwhile, enjoyed a decent race while clearly having a slower car than the two front running teams of Red Bull and Mercedes. Alonso finished in 3rd due to a strategy of pitting for fresh tyres in the final 10 laps that allowed him to overtake several cars, and after Hamilton's left rear tyre failure and Vettel's retirement with a gearbox issue.

In Germany, the F138s continued to struggle despite a few upgrades. Both F138s looked pretty good at the beginning of the weekend, but still not fast enough for the top positions. They finished 7th and 8th in Q3 with a different strategy compared to the other teams. Massa did not finish the race due to a gearbox problem and Alonso managed to pick up a few positions to finish 4th.

In Hungary, Ferrari did not bring any updates for the F138, so they again struggled. Alonso and Massa finished 5th and 7th in Q3, but they did not pick up any places in race as usual. The F138 lost its race pace. Team principal Stefano Domenicali said that they did not know why were they so slow in the race.

In Belgium, Ferrari showed very good pace in practice as the F138 showed to be only threat to Red Bull. It was the result of a package of upgrades which worked as expected. Qualifying did not go well for both F138s, due to being caught out by mixed conditions, but Alonso drove an incredible race and finished 2nd. Massa had a problem with his steering wheel and a bad start, finishing 7th.

In Italy, Ferrari brought a new low downforce package and most parts of it worked as expected. The F138 showed good pace by using towing in both practice sessions and qualifying. They finished 4th and 5th in Q3, but good starts and reasonably good pace gave them 2nd and 4th at the end of the race.

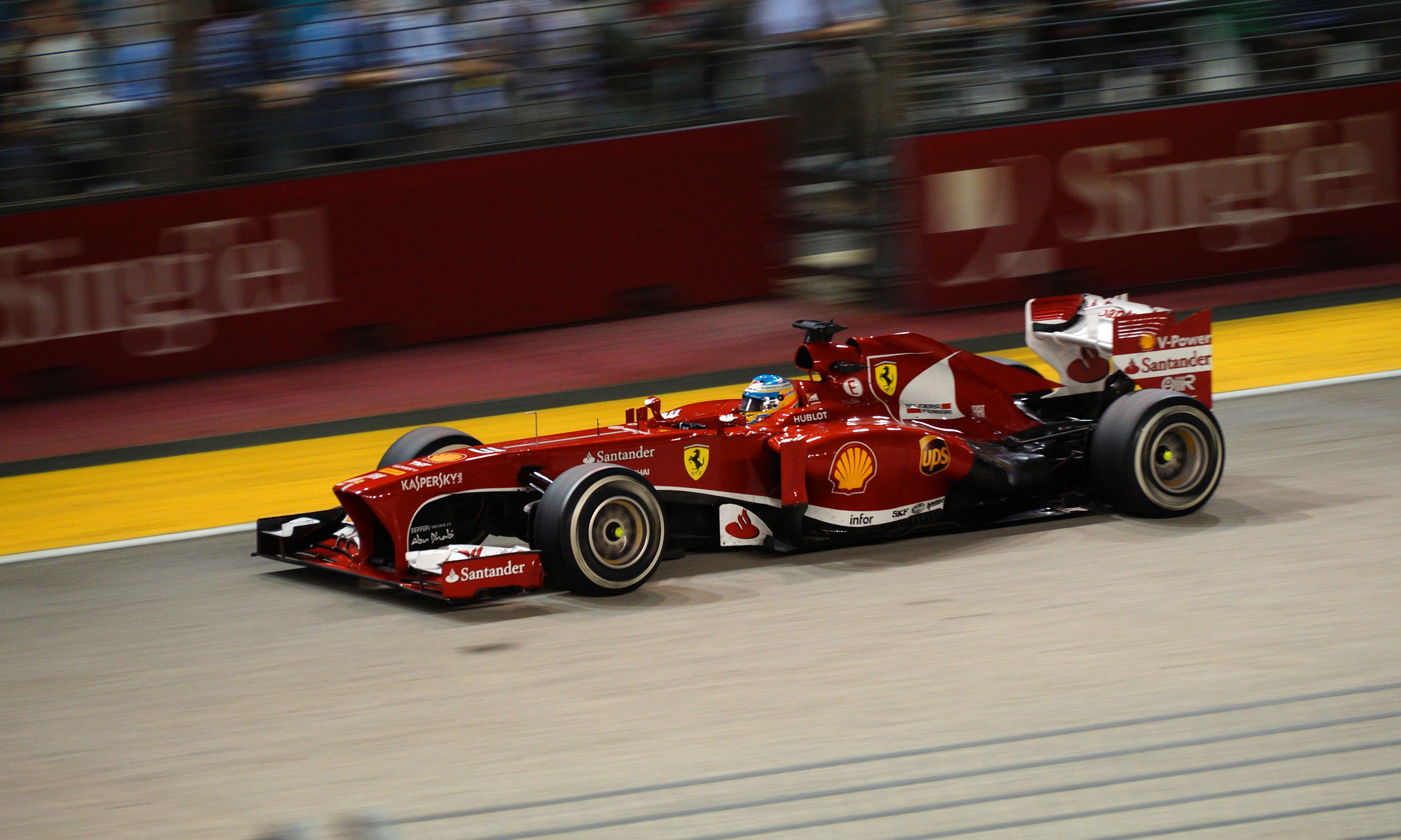
Fernando Alonso during the Singapore Grand Prix

In Singapore, Ferrari continued to struggle in a similar vein to before Italy. They were typically a second off the fastest time in practice and qualifying, lining up on the grid in 6th (Massa) and 7th (Alonso) places. Alonso made a great start and was third behind race leader Sebastian Vettel and second place Nico Rosberg. As the night race progressed, Alonso made the most of a safety car period and finished in a very creditable 2nd place, albeit 30 seconds behind the winner, Vettel. Mark Webber's Red Bull expired near the end of the race and Alonso gave the Australian a lift back to the pits, incurring a reprimand for both drivers.

== Complete Formula One results ==
(key) (results in bold indicate pole position; results in italics indicate fastest lap)

Year	Entrant	Engine	Tyres	Drivers	Grands Prix																			Points	WCC
Year	Entrant	Engine	Tyres	Drivers	AUS	MAL	CHN	BHR	ESP	MON	CAN	GBR	GER	HUN	BEL	ITA	SIN	KOR	JPN	IND	ABU	USA	BRA	Points	WCC
2013	Scuderia Ferrari	Ferrari Type 056	**P**	Fernando Alonso	2	Ret	1	8	1	7	2	3	4	5	2	2	2	6	4	11	5	5	3	**354**	**3rd**
2013	Scuderia Ferrari	Ferrari Type 056	**P**	Felipe Massa	4	5	6	15	3	Ret	8	6	Ret	8	7	4	6	9	10	4	8	12	7	**354**	**3rd**

== Other ==
The Ferrari F138 has been featured in the racing simulations F1 2013 and Assetto Corsa in the 'Red Pack' DLC.
