= Ferrari SF16-H =

Formula One car for the 2016 season

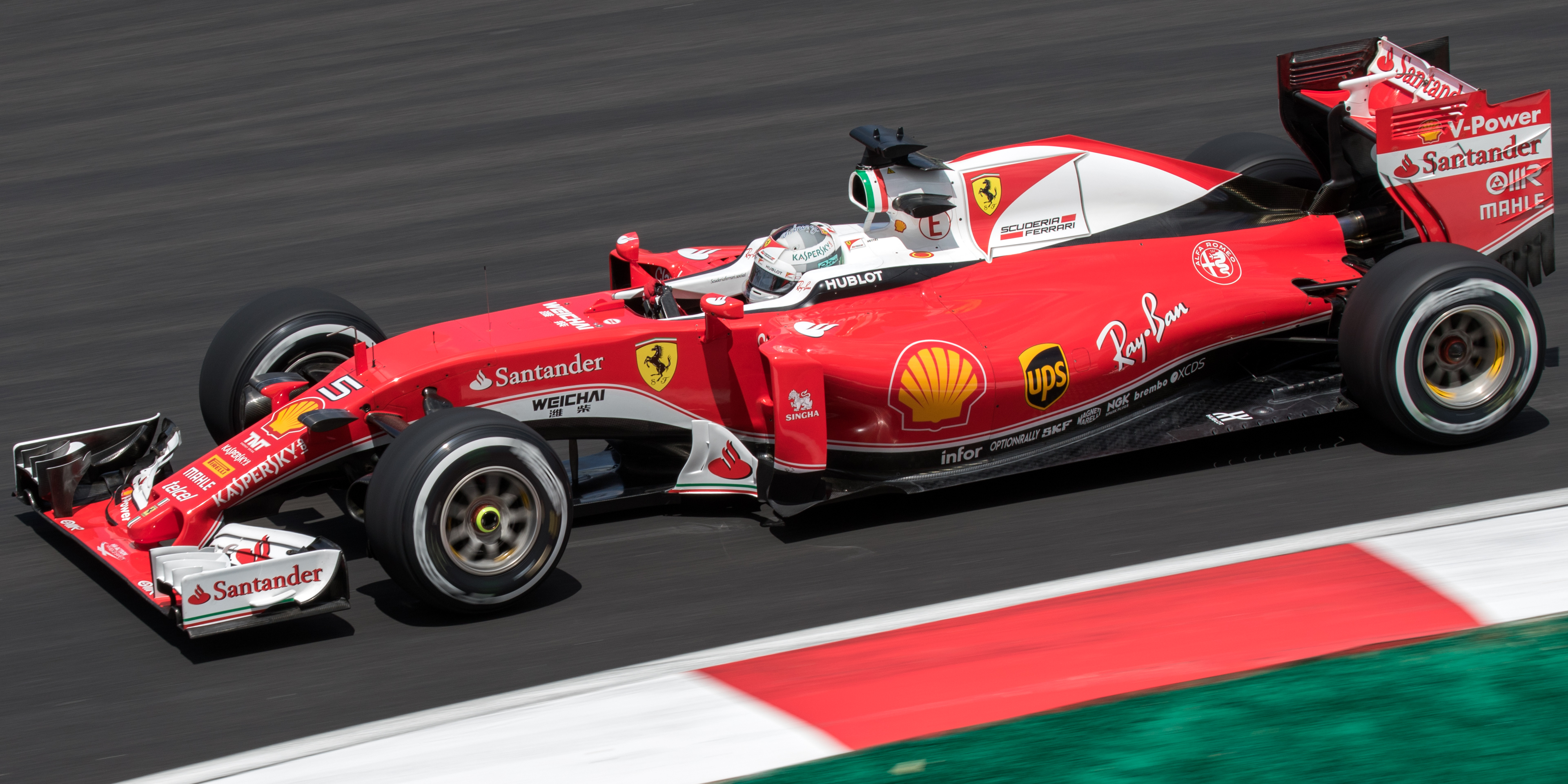
- The Ferrari SF16-H driven by Sebastian Vettel during the Malaysian Grand Prix
- Category: Formula One
- Constructor: Ferrari
- Designers: James Allison (Technical Director); Simone Resta (Chief Designer); Fabio Montecchi (Deputy Chief Designer); Andrea De Zordo (Deputy Chief Designer); Corrado Onorato (Deputy Chief Designer); Tiziano Battistini (Head of Chassis Design); Nick Collett (Head of R&D); Giacomo Tortora (Head of Performance Development); Daniele Casanova (Head of Performance Systems); Loïc Bigois (Head of Aerodynamics); Dirk de Beer (Chief Aerodynamicist); Mattia Binotto (Power Unit Director); Lorenzo Sassi (Chief Designer, Power Unit)
- Predecessor: Ferrari SF15-T
- Successor: Ferrari SF70H

Technical specifications
- Chassis: Carbon fibre and honeycomb composite structure
- Suspension (front): Push-rod
- Suspension (rear): Pull-rod
- Engine: Ferrari 061 1.6 L (98 cu in) direct injection V6 turbocharged engine, 900 hp limited to 15,000 rpm in a mid-mounted, rear-wheel drive layout
- Electric motor: Kinetic and thermal energy recovery systems
- Transmission: Ferrari sequential shift gearbox with 8 forward gears, 1 reverse gear
- Weight: 702 kg (1,548 lb)
- Fuel: Shell V-Power

Competition history
- Notable entrants: Scuderia Ferrari
- Notable drivers: 5. (Germany) Sebastian Vettel; 7. (Finland) Kimi Räikkönen
- Debut: 2016 Australian Grand Prix
- Last event: 2016 Abu Dhabi Grand Prix
| Races | Wins | Podiums | Poles | F/Laps |
|---|---|---|---|---|
| 21 | 0 | 11 | 0 | 4 |

The Ferrari SF16-H is a Formula One racing car designed and built by Ferrari to compete in the 2016 Formula One season, during which it was driven by four-time World Champion Sebastian Vettel and 2007 World Champion Kimi Räikkönen.

== Design ==
=== Naming and chassis ===
The SF16-H was launched on 19 February 2016. The "H" in the name of the car stands for "Hybrid". The chassis was designed by James Allison, Simone Resta and Dirk de Beer with Mattia Binotto leading the powertrain design. Ferrari were quick to adapt to new rules surrounding a single paddle clutch, noted as one of the few teams to make a significant adjustment to their steering wheel.

=== Sponsorship and livery ===
The SF16-H had a predominantly red and white livery, similar to that used on the Ferrari 312T and F93A. Despite a ban on tobacco advertising, Marlboro were still a key sponsor for the team alongside long term partners Santander and Shell. Haas sponsorship departed as they became their own team.

=== Miscellaneous ===
In accordance with his habit of giving his cars female nicknames, Vettel dubbed his SF16-H "Margherita", in reference to Margherita of Savoy, the Queen consort of the Kingdom of Italy from 1878 to 1900.

== Season summary ==
The season started positively for Vettel who secured third place and a podium in Australia, whilst Räikkönen was forced to retire due to a damaged turbo that caused a fire. In Bahrain, the drivers luck swapped and Vettel retired on the formation lap, whilst Räikkönen managed to secure second place. Across the first five races of the season, at least one of the SF16-H drivers finished on the podium. In Monaco, Räikkönen retired after an accident in challenging weather conditions. He briefly continued driving, but the damage was too great. He later escaped penalty for continuing to drive with a severely damaged car.

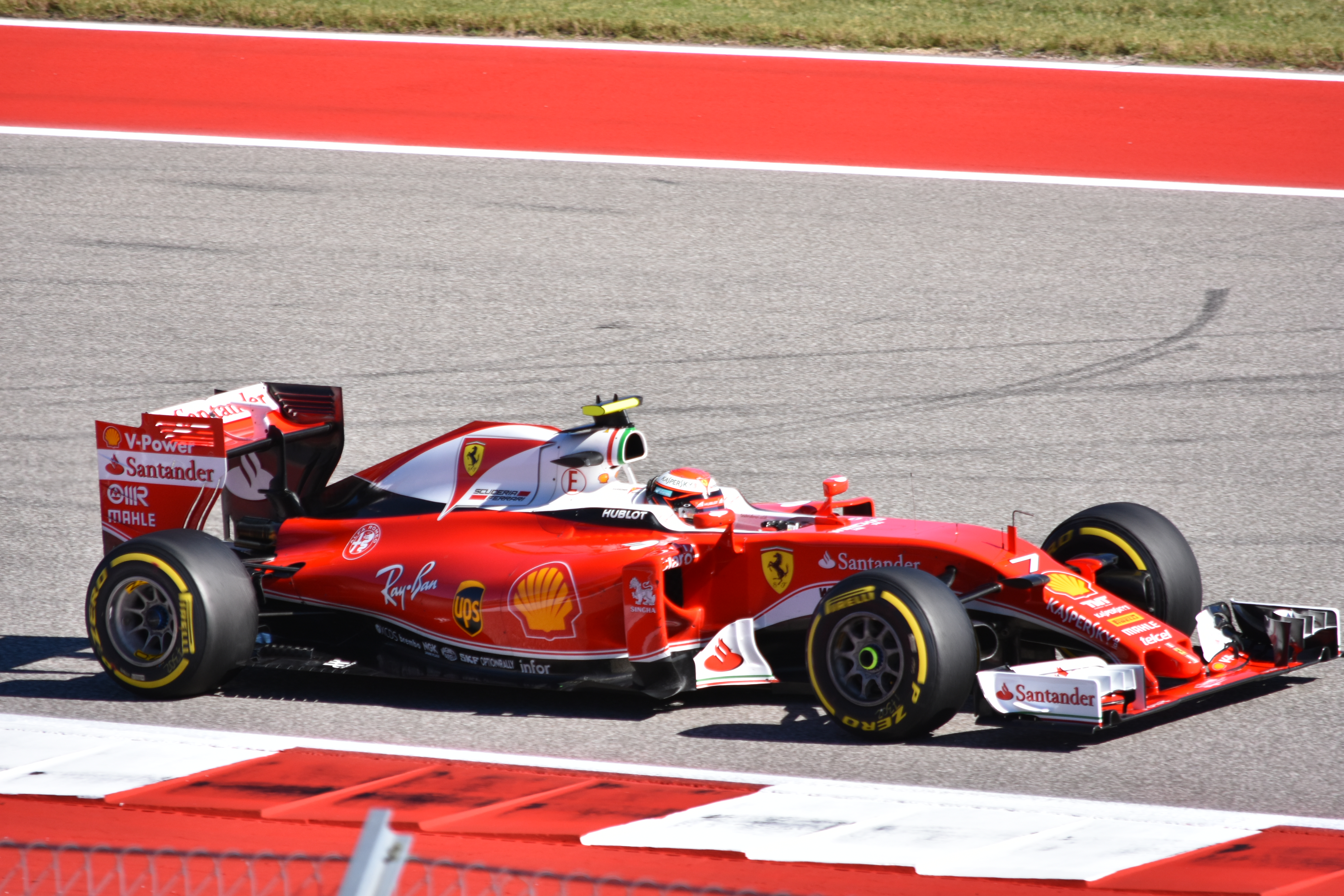
Räikkönen at the United States Grand Prix

In season developments came, including a fix for the fragile turbocharger ahead of the 2016 Canadian Grand Prix. However, a failure at Silverstone saw the rules change to increase the depth of the turbocharger casing, and as a result an additional 2kg was added to the SF16-H weight. As the season continued, both Vettel and Räikkönen scored points regularly, albeit usually outside of the podium positions with a handful of retirements, as they were generally outpaced by the resurgent Red Bull team. Vettel finished the season on a high, delivering the cars first podium in Abu Dhabi since Monza, 7 races earlier.

The SF16-H took the team to third place in the Constructors Championship standings, with a total point score of 398. Overall, the car scored eleven podiums and four fastest laps, but failed to win a Grand Prix or secure pole position at any round of the season.

== Halo device ==
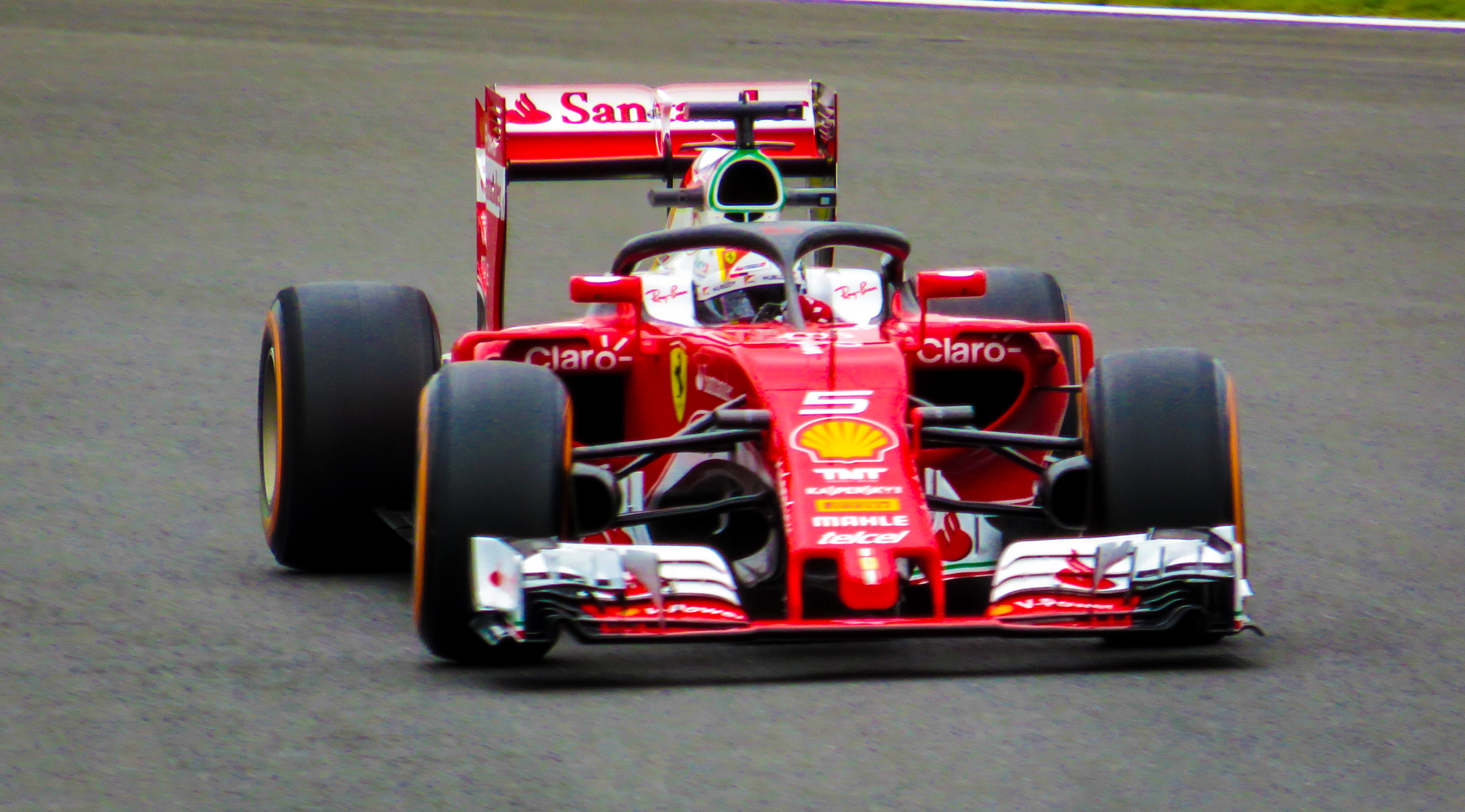
Vettel testing the new Halo device at the British Grand Prix

In early 2015, a meeting of the FIA to discuss forthcoming rules for Formula One had included increased cockpit protection from the 2017 season. This came following a number of incidents which severely injured or cost the lives of racing drivers including Jules Bianchi and Justin Wilson. Various options were considered, including the Halo device which would ultimately be pursued. At the British Grand Prix, Vettel tested the Halo device on the SF16-H during free practice.

== Complete Formula One results ==
(key) (results in bold indicate pole position; results in italics indicate fastest lap)

| Year | Entrant | Engine | Tyres | Drivers | Grands Prix | | | | | | | | | | | | | | | | | | | | | Points | WCC |
| Year | Entrant | Engine | Tyres | Drivers | AUS | BHR | CHN | RUS | ESP | MON | CAN | EUR | AUT | GBR | HUN | GER | BEL | ITA | SIN | MAL | JPN | USA | MEX | BRA | ABU | Points | WCC |
|---|---|---|---|---|---|---|---|---|---|---|---|---|---|---|---|---|---|---|---|---|---|---|---|---|---|---|---|
| 2016 | Scuderia Ferrari | Ferrari 061 | **P** | Sebastian Vettel | 3 | DNS | 2 | Ret | 3 | 4 | 2 | 2 | Ret | 9 | 4 | 5 | 6 | 3 | 5 | Ret | 4 | 4 | 5 | 5 | 3 | **398** | **3rd** |
| 2016 | Scuderia Ferrari | Ferrari 061 | **P** | Kimi Räikkönen | Ret | 2 | 5 | 3 | 2 | Ret | 6 | 4 | 3 | 5 | 6 | 6 | 9 | 4 | 4 | 4 | 5 | Ret | 6 | Ret | 6 | **398** | **3rd** |
