= Ferrari SF15-T =

Formula One racing car

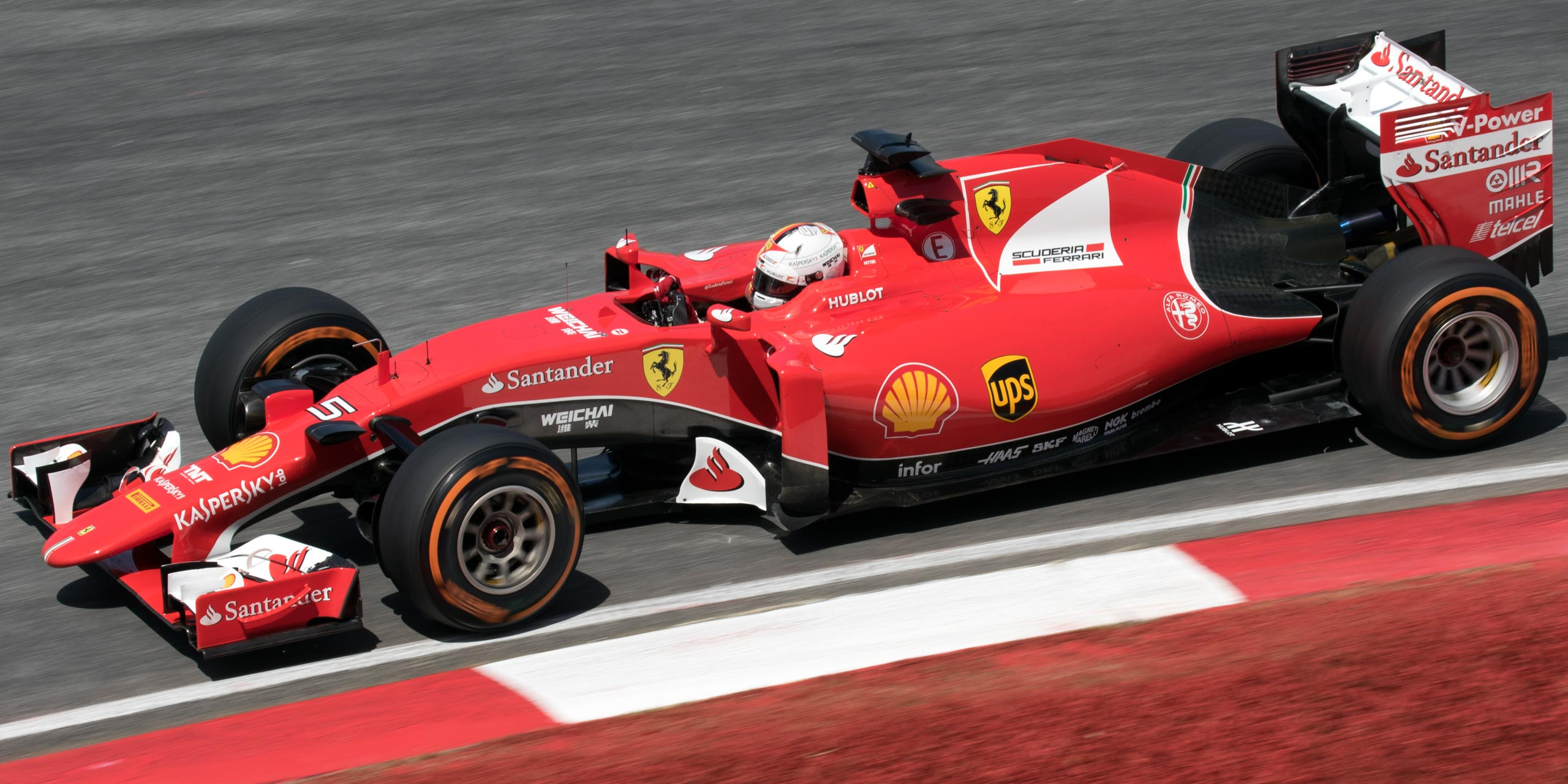
- Sebastian Vettel driving the SF15-T at the Malaysian Grand Prix
- Category: Formula One
- Constructor: Ferrari
- Designers: James Allison (Technical Director); Simone Resta (Chief Designer); Fabio Montecchi (Deputy Chief Designer); Andrea De Zordo (Deputy Chief Designer); Tiziano Battistini (Head of Chassis Design); Nick Collett (Head of R&D); Giacomo Tortora (Head of Performance Development); Daniele Casanova (Head of Performance Systems); Loïc Bigois (Head of Aerodynamics); Dirk de Beer (Chief Aerodynamicist); Mattia Binotto (Power Unit Director); Lorenzo Sassi (Chief Designer, Power Unit)
- Predecessor: Ferrari F14 T
- Successor: Ferrari SF16-H

Technical specifications
- Chassis: Carbon fibre and honeycomb composite structure
- Engine: Ferrari 060 1.6 L (98 cu in) V6 turbo
- Electric motor: Kinetic and thermal energy recovery systems
- Transmission: Semi-automatic, sequential 8 forward gears, 1 reverse gear
- Power: 840–850 hp (626–634 kW) @ 10,800 rpm
- Weight: 702 kg (1,548 lb)
- Fuel: Shell V-Power
- Lubricants: Shell Helix
- Tyres: Pirelli P Zero (dry), Cinturato (wet)

Competition history
- Notable entrants: Scuderia Ferrari
- Notable drivers: 5. (Germany) Sebastian Vettel; 7. (Finland) Kimi Räikkönen
- Debut: 2015 Australian Grand Prix
- First win: 2015 Malaysian Grand Prix
- Last win: 2015 Singapore Grand Prix
- Last event: 2015 Abu Dhabi Grand Prix
Races	Wins	Podiums	Poles	F/Laps
19	3	16	1	3

The Ferrari SF15-T is a Formula One racing car that Ferrari used to compete in the 2015 Formula One season. The chassis was designed by James Allison, Simone Resta and Dirk de Beer, with Mattia Binotto leading the powertrain design. It was driven by Sebastian Vettel and Kimi Räikkönen. The SF15-T was launched on 30 January 2015.

== Background ==
=== Naming ===
The car was named SF15-T by adding the letter "S" before the "F", forming Scuderia Ferrari's initials and retaining the year of competition as well the letter "T" for turbocharged. Carrying over his tradition from Red Bull and Toro Rosso, Vettel named his SF15-T "Eva".

== Season summary ==
Team principal Maurizio Arrivabene had set the team a target of winning 2 races in the 2015 season. Vettel won the Malaysian Grand Prix after capitalising on an early safety car. Räikkönen came home in fourth place after suffering a puncture following contact with another car in the early stages of the race. In Bahrain, Räikkönen had his best showing yet coming home in 2nd place. He capitalised on Vettel's troubles and Nico Rosberg's brake by wire issues.

A second win was achieved in Hungary, when Vettel overtook the two Mercedes cars at the start and led for the majority of the race. Vettel took his first pole for Ferrari and the team's first for three years – since the 2012 German Grand Prix – in Singapore, ending the dominance of qualifying for Mercedes, since the dawn of the new Formula One turbo era. He then led the entire race, to take his and the team's third victory of the season with Räikkönen finishing third to record the team's first double podium finish for two years.

Ferrari finished the season 2nd in the Constructors' table with 428 points, nearly doubling their point total from the previous year. They proved to be the only true challenger to the dominant Mercedes team, as they were the only other team to win races. One minor consolation in the year was winning the inaugural DHL Fastest Pit Stop Award for completing the fastest pitstop in the most races during the season.

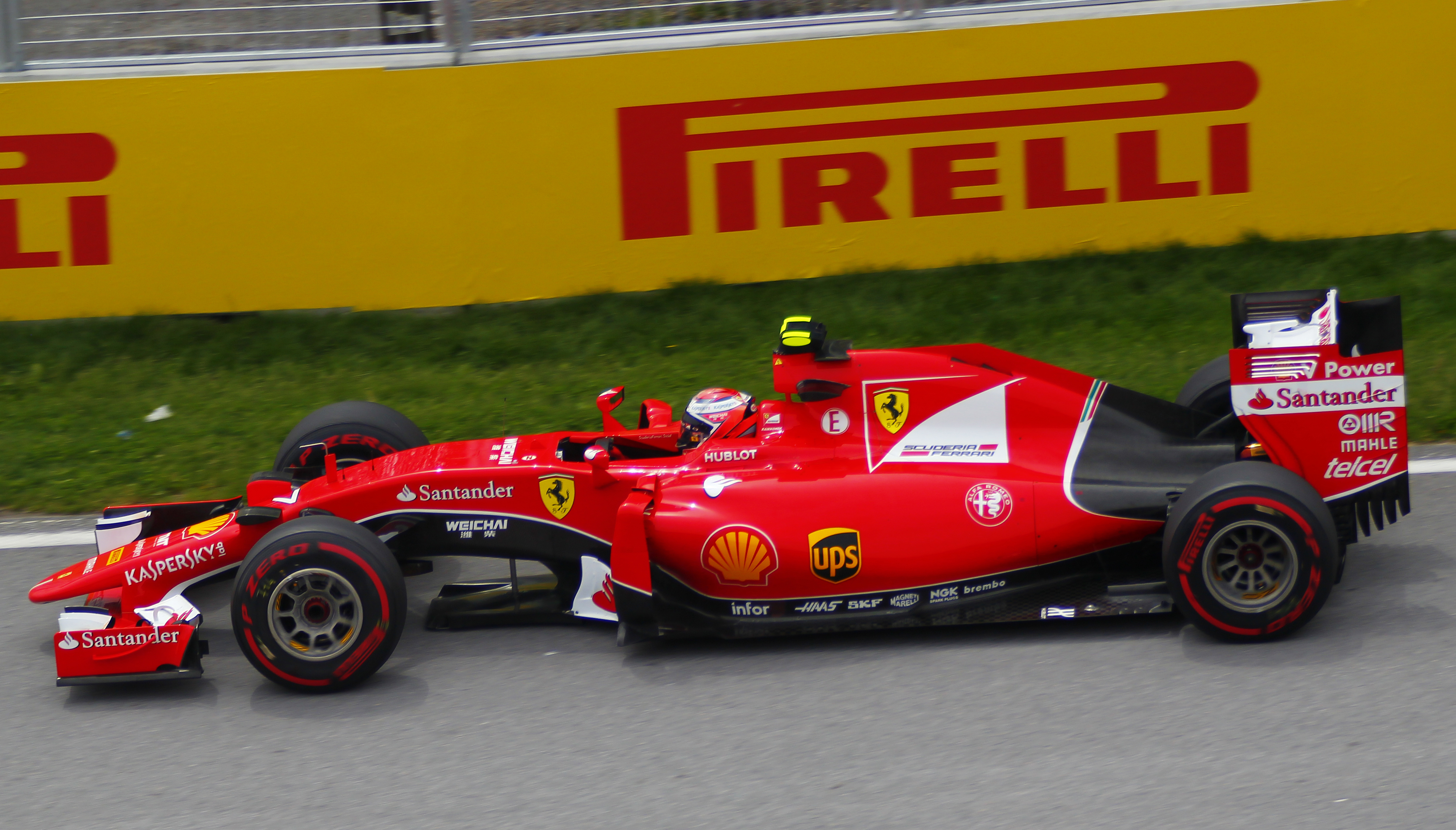
Kimi Räikkönen driving the SF15-T during the Canadian Grand Prix

== Livery ==
This was the final year for Haas sponsorship before they would eventually become their own F1 team the following season.

The team paid tribute to Jules Bianchi at the Hungarian Grand Prix with carrying a message "Jules nei nostri cuori" ("Jules in our hearts") on the headrest. At the Belgian Grand Prix, Ferrari celebrated their 900th Grand Prix and their cars carried a logo celebrating the achievement on their upper front of the nose cone.

== Complete Formula One results ==
(key) (results in bold indicate pole position; results in italics indicate fastest lap)

Year	Entrant	Engine	Tyres	Drivers	1	2	3	4	5	6	7	8	9	10	11	12	13	14	15	16	17	18	19	Pts	WCC
2015	Scuderia Ferrari	Ferrari	**P**		AUS	MAL	CHN	BHR	ESP	MON	CAN	AUT	GBR	HUN	BEL	ITA	SIN	JPN	RUS	USA	MEX	BRA	ABU	**428**	**2nd**
2015	Scuderia Ferrari	Ferrari	**P**	Sebastian Vettel	3	1	3	5	3	2	5	4	3	1	12^{†}	2	**1**	3	2	3	Ret	3	4	**428**	**2nd**
2015	Scuderia Ferrari	Ferrari	**P**	Kimi Räikkönen	Ret	4	4	2	5	6	4	Ret	8	Ret	7	5	3	4	8	Ret	Ret	4	3	**428**	**2nd**

^{†} Driver failed to finish the race, but was classified as they had completed greater than 90% of the race distance.

== Other ==
The Ferrari SF15-T has been featured in the racing simulations F1 2015 and Assetto Corsa.
