= Ferrari F2012 =

Formula One car 2012 Scuderia Ferrari

- Fernando Alonso driving the F2012 at the 2012 Malaysian Grand Prix
- Category: Formula One
- Constructor: Scuderia Ferrari
- Designers: Pat Fry (Technical Director); Nikolas Tombazis (Chief Designer); Marco Fainello (Head of Vehicle Engineering); Tiziano Battistini (Head of Chassis Design); Simone Resta (Head of R&D); Nicolas Hennel (Chief Aerodynamicist); Luca Marmorini (Engine and Electronics Director); Guido di Paola (Engine Chief Designer)
- Predecessor: Ferrari 150º Italia
- Successor: Ferrari F138

Technical specifications
- Chassis: carbon-fibre and honeycomb composite monocoque
- Suspension (front): Independent suspension, pull-rod activated torsion springs
- Suspension (rear): as front
- Engine: Ferrari Tipo 056-2012 2,398 cc (146 cu in) V8 (90°) 750 hp (560 kW) Naturally aspirated, 18,000 RPM limited with KERS, mid-mounted
- Transmission: Ferrari 7 speeds + reverse Semi-automatic sequential, electronically controlled, longitudinal gearbox, quick-shift Limited-slip differential
- Weight: 640 kg (1,411.0 lb) (including driver, water and lubricant)
- Fuel: Shell V-Power ULG 66L/2 Fuel; Shell Helix Ultra Lubricant
- Tyres: Pirelli P Zero (dry), Cinturato (wet); OZ Wheels (front and rear): 13"

Competition history
- Notable entrants: Scuderia Ferrari
- Notable drivers: 5. (Spain) Fernando Alonso; 6. (Brazil) Felipe Massa
- Debut: 2012 Australian Grand Prix
- First win: 2012 Malaysian Grand Prix
- Last win: 2012 German Grand Prix
- Last event: 2012 Brazilian Grand Prix
Races	Wins	Podiums	Poles	F/Laps
20	3	15	2	0

The Ferrari F2012 is a Formula One racing car designed by Scuderia Ferrari for the 2012 Formula One season. The chassis was designed by Pat Fry, Nikolas Tombazis and Nicolas Hennel with Luca Marmorini leading the engine and electronics design. The car was launched on 3 February at Ferrari's facility in Maranello. The car, which was driven by Fernando Alonso and Felipe Massa, made its debut at the first pre-season test at Jerez.

== Background ==
=== Name ===
This car reused the name with 'F' prefix that ends with a year that competed. This was the first time Ferrari used this since the F2008.

=== Chassis ===
Like most 2012-specification cars, the F2012 featured a 'stepped nose' to conform to new FIA safety regulations. The F2012 featured a pull-rod front suspension, which had not been seen in Formula One since the 2001 Minardi PS01 and Arrows A22 cars. A pull-rod rear suspension was also introduced. L-shaped inlets also feature on the sidepods as the F10 did in 2010.

It was reported that Ferrari had developed a "reactive ride height" suspension system, a mechanical device designed to maintain ride height under braking which they hoped to use in their 2012 car. The FIA ruled that devices contravene the regulations as they could improve the aerodynamic performance of cars, which led to the device being banned.

== Season overview ==
During pre-season testing journalists reported several reports of problems with the car's handling. It understeered travelling into the curve and oversteered as the car came out of the curve. Felipe Massa reported that the team needed to carry out substantial work in order to understand the car. Ferrari denied that the car was under-performing, but during the Australian Grand Prix both Alonso and Massa went off the track after struggling with the handling, and could only qualify 12th and 16th respectively. Alonso finished the race in fifth, while Massa retired after a collision with Williams driver Bruno Senna.

In the week before the Malaysian Grand Prix, Ferrari took the extraordinary step of preparing a brand-new chassis for Massa. Unable to explain the difference between Alonso and Massa's performances in Melbourne, the team prepared the chassis for Massa in the belief that the car he used in Australia was flawed.

In the race, extreme weather conditions led to Alonso taking the lead after the first round of pit stops. The Ferrari F2012 showed that it had very good performance in damp conditions, but as the track started to dry, Sauber had better pace than Ferrari and Pérez cut Alonso's advantage from seven seconds to just half a second. Soon Alonso pitted from the lead and Pérez a lap later, keeping Alonso in first position because Pérez had to drive a whole lap longer on intermediates, while Alonso, having pitted, drove that lap on mediums thus increasing the advantage over Pérez to five seconds. Pérez again started chasing down Alonso and again cutting the advantage, but his front tyres began to wear out quickly because of driving just behind Alonso's F2012 which eventually led to Pérez making a mistake, running deep at the chicane, thus having him again more than five seconds behind Alonso. There was not enough time to chase him again so Alonso went on to win the race, the first for the brand-new F2012.

In China, the F2012 had a similar gap to the fastest cars, Alonso qualifying ninth and Massa twelfth. In the race, however, Alonso again showed his skill and had a chance to fight for fourth place, but lack of the pace in the final stages of the race, and Alonso going off the track while trying to pass a driver ahead in the middle of the corner led to him taking ninth at the end of the race. Massa finished 13th.

In Bahrain, which did not suit the F2012 at all, Massa qualified 14th, and Alonso ninth, having not set a time in Q3 in order to preserve tyres for the race. The race itself did not provide any surprise, Alonso finishing in seventh and Massa in ninth position.

At the in-season testing that took place at Mugello Circuit, Ferrari tried different solutions of the exhaust system in order to improve the traction of the car, and to make it less sensitive to its throttle position, which would make the car much easier to handle. So they came up with a solution which did exactly as mentioned before, but still had plenty of room for more improvements. With that solution, Ferrari set off to Spain.

In Spain, Alonso had set the fastest time in first practice on the Friday, and originally qualified in third place, less than 0.6 of a second behind Hamilton and less than 0.02 seconds behind Maldonado in second. However, Alonso was promoted to second on the grid after Hamilton was excluded from qualifying. In contrast, Felipe Massa was held up in traffic during his Q2 lap and subsequently started from 16th. In the race Alonso managed to get off to a good start and was leading after the second corner, but a variety of factors including traffic and accelerated tyre degradation meant that he eventually finished second behind Maldonado, by fewer than four seconds. Massa was running in the top ten in the early stages of the race, before incurring a drive through penalty following speeding under yellow flag conditions, caused by Schumacher crashing with Senna. Massa finished the race in 15th. This race showed that F2012 was steadily improving its performance.

In Monaco, both cars made into Q3 for the first time this year, with Alonso qualifying sixth, 0.6 seconds behind the original polesitter Michael Schumacher, with Massa less than 0.2 seconds behind Alonso in seventh, however, Alonso was promoted to fifth following Schumacher's five-place grid penalty carried over from Barcelona. In the race, both cars showed good pace, with Alonso having the pace to challenge for the lead and Massa looking similar to Alonso on pace. Subsequently, Alonso finished in third place, 0.947 seconds behind the race winner Mark Webber, and Massa in sixth, less than 6.2 seconds behind the race winner Webber. The championship standings after this race shows that Ferrari are in fourth place behind Lotus, and Alonso has regained the championship lead, 3 points ahead of both Red Bull Drivers and a further 10 points ahead of Lewis Hamilton in fourth. This was the second and the last race of the Mugello-configuration exhaust.

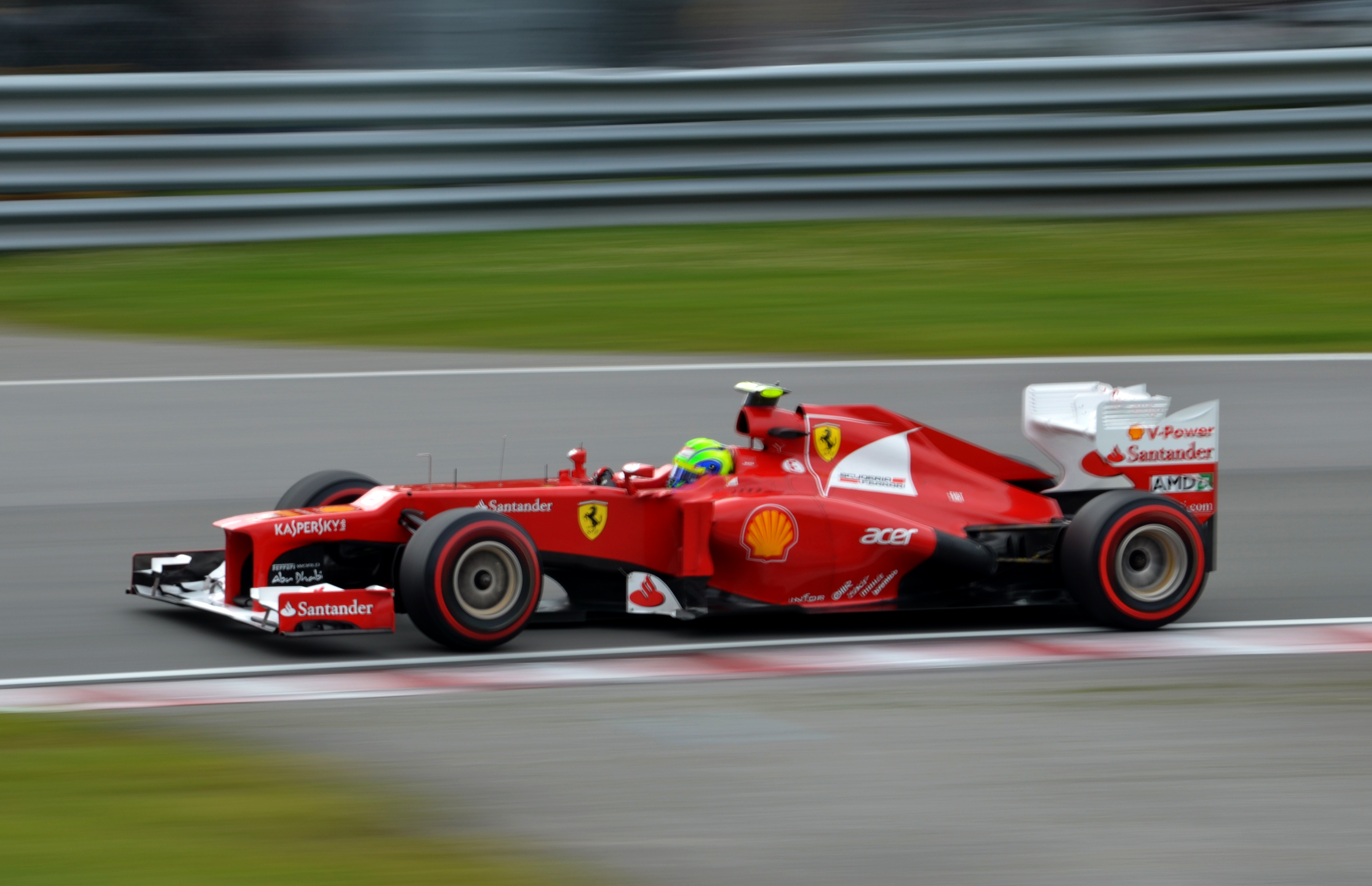
Felipe Massa during the Canadian Grand Prix

In Canada, Ferrari made a large step forward in performance, introducing a new exhaust configuration similar to the McLaren cars, using the coanda effect more effectively than the previous solution and vastly improving overall tyre wear and downforce. In qualifying F2012 proved it was competitive enough to fight for the first three rows on the grid. Alonso qualified third, three tenths off the pole, and Massa qualified sixth, which was the best result for Ferrari in 2012 up to date. Race started well for Ferrari with Massa immediately pushing hard for positions, but eventually he made a mistake and spun, so that ruined his race. He finished tenth. Alonso was saving tires and it paid off when Sebastian Vettel pitted. Alonso came into the pits two laps later, which allowed him to take the second position. At the second round of pit stops, Hamilton went first to the pits, but both Alonso and Vettel were not set to do the same, and tried to finish the race without pitting. But that strategy was false for both of them, because tyres started to degrade very fast so cars behind were closing and closing and eventually started to attacking Fernando for position. He could not manage to hold for long, so he finished the race fifth.

In Valencia, the race saw a very interesting turn of events for F2012 as early in the race Vettel had gained a lead of about 20 seconds but a safety car period, that resulted from collision of Jean-Éric Vergne and Heikki Kovalainen, eliminated Vettel's early lead and an alternator failure ended his race, Romain Grosjean was also very much in the competition until he also faced same problem as that of Vettel. This led Alonso to take on first position, after starting 11th on the grid. Massa followed Alonso up the grid throughout the early part of the race until an untimely pit-stop and a collision with Kamui Kobayashi ruined his race. Afterwards, Kobayashi was penalised for the incident, but Massa could only finish 16th.

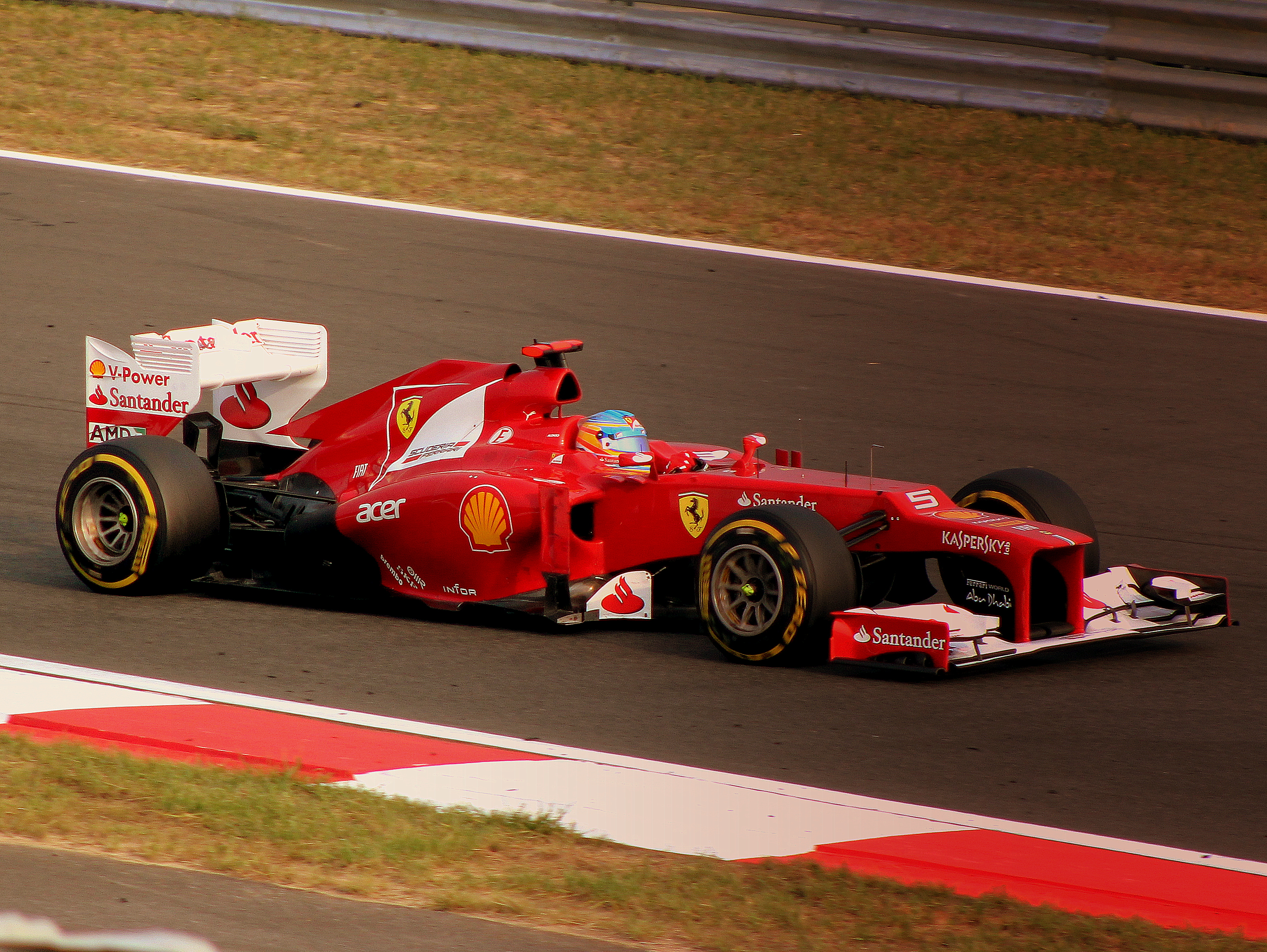
Fernando Alonso at the Korean Grand Prix

Despite the car's significant lack of performance (being the third best car of the grid marginally ahead of Lotus and far from the top four on the first stages of the race), Alonso did manage to mount a challenge for the title until the last race held in Interlagos. Vettel was leading the championship by 13 points, but when he was spun around and ended up in last position at the start of the race, title hopes were high for Alonso. However, Vettel recovered to sixth by the end of the race, and Alonso's second-place finish meant he missed out on the title by 3 points.

== Sponsorship and livery ==
Ferrari was the centre of controversy over the course of the Indian Grand Prix when they displayed the flag of the Italian Navy on the nose of the car in support of the Italian sailors held by Indian authorities over a shooting incident that resulted in the deaths of two Indian fishermen in February 2012.

== Complete Formula One results ==
(key) (results in bold indicate pole position; results in italics indicate fastest lap)

Year	Entrant	Engine	Tyres	Drivers	1	2	3	4	5	6	7	8	9	10	11	12	13	14	15	16	17	18	19	20	Points	WCC
2012	Scuderia Ferrari	Ferrari Type 056	**P**		AUS	MAL	CHN	BHR	ESP	MON	CAN	EUR	GBR	GER	HUN	BEL	ITA	SIN	JPN	KOR	IND	ABU	USA	BRA	**400**	**2nd**
2012	Scuderia Ferrari	Ferrari Type 056	**P**	Fernando Alonso	5	1	9	7	2	3	5	1	**2**	**1**	5	Ret	3	3	Ret	3	2	2	3	2	**400**	**2nd**
2012	Scuderia Ferrari	Ferrari Type 056	**P**	Felipe Massa	Ret	15	13	9	15	6	10	16	4	12	9	5	4	8	2	4	6	7	4	3	**400**	**2nd**
