= Ferrari SF70H =

2017 Formula One car by Ferrari

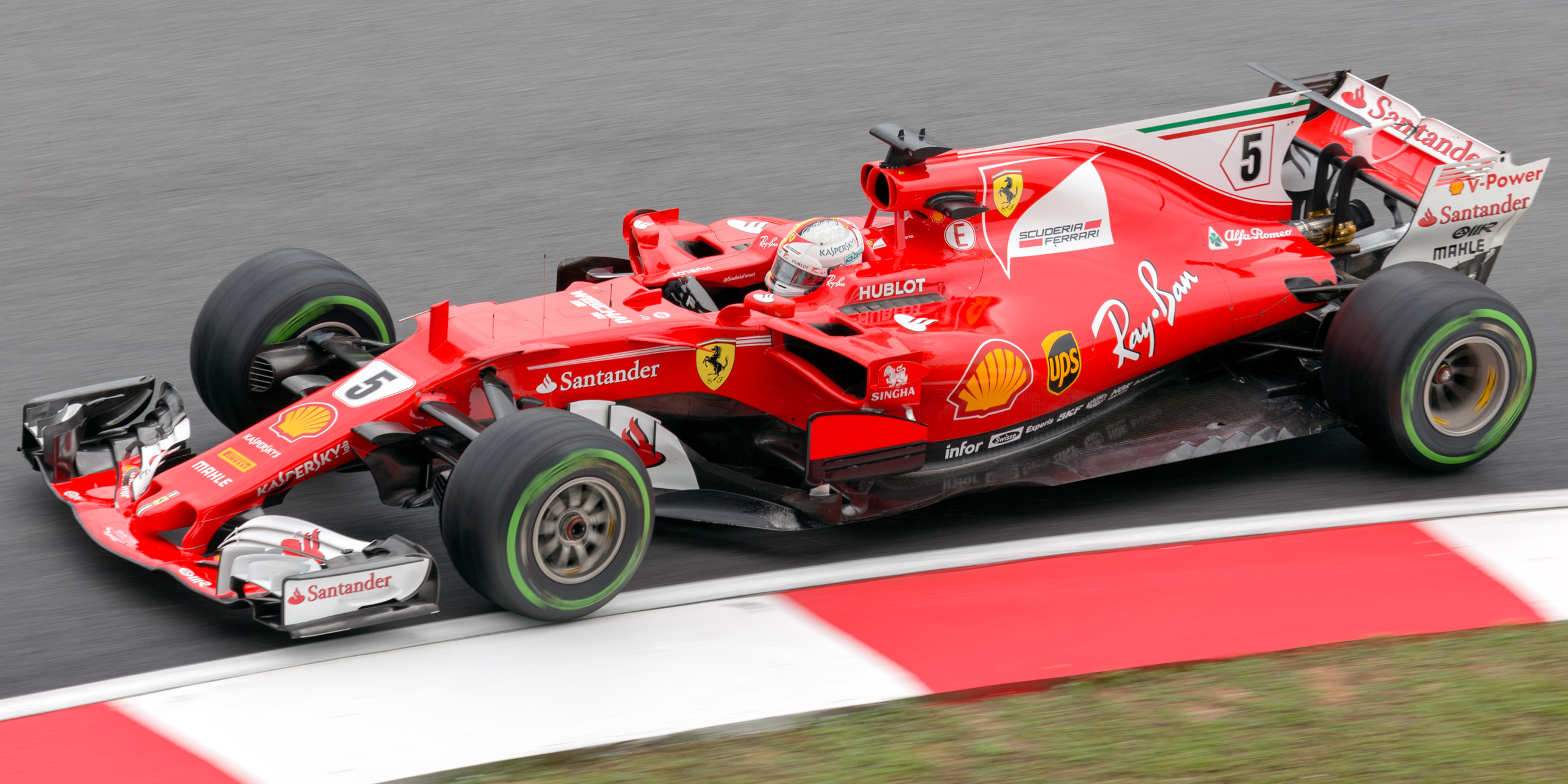
- Sebastian Vettel driving the SF70H at the Malaysian Grand Prix
- Category: Formula One
- Constructor: Ferrari
- Designers: Mattia Binotto (Technical Director); Simone Resta (Chief Designer); Fabio Montecchi (Deputy Chief Designer); Andrea De Zordo (Deputy Chief Designer); Corrado Onorato (Deputy Chief Designer); Tiziano Battistini (Head of Chassis Design); Giacomo Tortora (Head of Performance Development); Daniele Casanova (Head of Performance Systems); Enrico Cardile (Head of Aerodynamics); David Sanchez (Chief Aerodynamicist); Rory Byrne (Technical Consultant); Lorenzo Sassi (Chief Engineer, Power Unit)
- Predecessor: Ferrari SF16-H
- Successor: Ferrari SF71H

Technical specifications
- Chassis: Carbon fibre and honeycomb composite structure
- Length: 5000mm
- Width: 2000mm
- Height: 950mm
- Wheelbase: 3,594 mm (141 in)
- Engine: Ferrari 062 1.6L (1,600 cc, 98 cu in.) direct injection V6 turbocharged engine, limited to 15,000 rpm in a mid-mounted, rear-wheel drive layout
- Electric motor: Kinetic and thermal energy recovery systems
- Transmission: Ferrari semi-automatic sequential longitudinal gearbox, 8 gears + RM
- Power: 950-1000 hp (708-746 kW)
- Weight: 728 kg (including driver and fuel)
- Fuel: Shell V-Power
- Tyres: Pirelli P Zero (dry) tyres Pirelli Cinturato (wet) tyres

Competition history
- Notable entrants: Scuderia Ferrari
- Notable drivers: 5 (Germany) Sebastian Vettel; 7 (Finland) Kimi Räikkönen
- Debut: 2017 Australian Grand Prix
- First win: 2017 Australian Grand Prix
- Last win: 2017 Brazilian Grand Prix
- Last event: 2017 Abu Dhabi Grand Prix
Races	Wins	Podiums	Poles	F/Laps
20	5	20	5	7

The Ferrari SF70H is a Formula One racing car designed and constructed by Scuderia Ferrari to compete in the 2017 Formula One season. It was driven by Sebastian Vettel and Kimi Räikkönen. The car made its competitive début at the 2017 Australian Grand Prix, where it finished first and fourth in the hands of Vettel and Räikkönen, respectively. In keeping with his tradition of giving his cars female nicknames, Vettel named his SF70H "Gina".

== Background and design ==
=== Name ===
The model was named "SF70H", marking Ferrari's 70th anniversary as a manufacturer.

=== Chassis ===
The chassis was designed by Mattia Binotto, Simone Resta, Enrico Cardile, David Sanchez and Rory Byrne with Corrado Iotti leading the powertrain design. The SF70H features a shark fin for the first time since the F10 in 2010 and the nose cone inlets since the F2008 in 2008.

== Competition history ==
=== Opening rounds ===
The car proved to be fast in pre-season testing, and it carried its form into the first race of the season, the Australian Grand Prix. Vettel qualified in 2nd, splitting the two Mercedes cars and Räikkönen qualified in 4th. Vettel took the lead from Lewis Hamilton on lap 17 when he pitted for new tyres. Hamilton rejoined behind Max Verstappen and could not pass him. Vettel took advantage of this and came out in the lead after his stop. Vettel went on to win the inaugural race of the season ahead of the two Mercedes drivers, giving Ferrari its first win since the 2015 Singapore Grand Prix. Räikkönen finished in 4th after fending off a late charge from Verstappen. This result also marked the first race weekend after which a Mercedes-powered team was not leading the Constructors' Championship since the 2013 Brazilian Grand Prix.

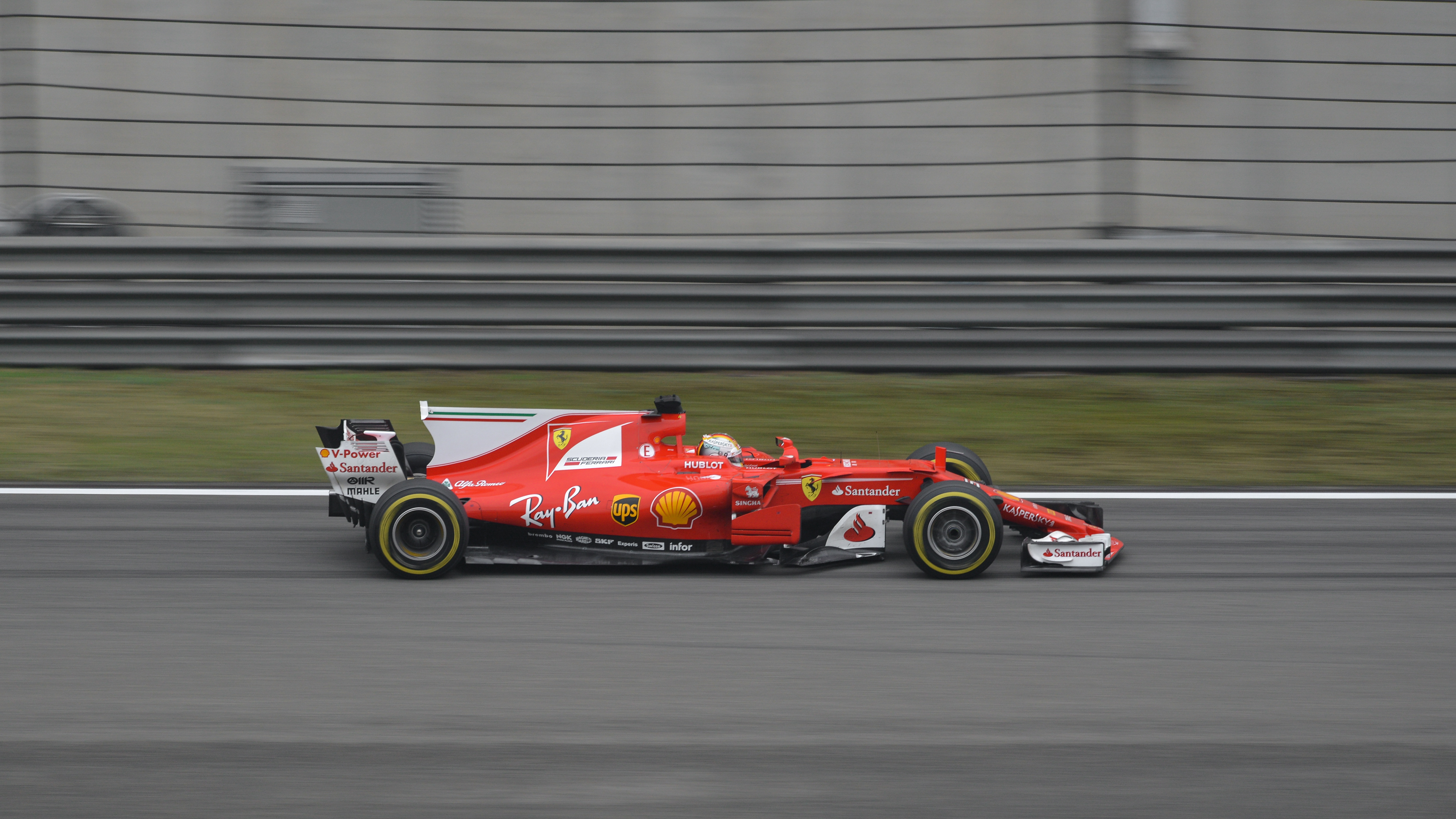
Vettel at the Chinese Grand Prix

In China Vettel and Räikkönen qualified in same positions as in Australia, i.e., in 2nd and 4th respectively. The race started in semi-dry conditions. Everyone, except Toro Rosso's Carlos Sainz Jr. started on the Intermediate tyre compound. At the end of lap 2, many drivers including Vettel decided to pit for dry tyres under the Virtual Safety Car caused by Williams' Lance Stroll who had crashed. This proved to be very costly for Vettel as Sauber's Antonio Giovinazzi crashed on lap 4 which forced the Safety Car to come out. This meant that the two Red Bulls of Ricciardo and Verstappen along with Räikkönen had eclipsed Vettel in the pits and he was relegated to 5th. Vettel eventually managed to climb back up into 2nd and maintain his position till the end. Räikkönen meanwhile struggled with understeer throughout the whole weekend. At the start of the race, he was overtaken by Ricciardo into the first corner. Unlike his teammate, Räikkönen could not find a way past the two Red Bull cars and finished in fifth. Hamilton winning the race meant that he and Vettel were tied in points after two races. Mercedes also managed to outscore Ferrari which put them 1 point ahead of Ferrari in the Constructors' Championship before the Bahrain Grand Prix.

At the Bahrain Grand Prix, Vettel qualified third, 4 tenths of a second down on pole-sitter Valtteri Bottas. Räikkönen qualified fifth, behind Ricciardo. At the start, Vettel passed Hamilton for second and was pushing Bottas who struggled with pace and rear tyres. Vettel pitted for supersoft tyres when the safety car came out. Vettel came out in first place and started making advantage on softer tyres. Vettel pitted again and returned on soft tyres, while Hamilton took the lead on older tyres, with Bottas moving into second place. Hamilton pitted for new tyres and started chasing Vettel. He easily passed Bottas but Vettel maintained the lead to win the Bahrain Grand Prix for the third time, with Räikkönen finishing fourth. It was Vettel's second win in first three races in the season.

Ferrari would earn their first front-row lockout of the season in Russia with Vettel taking pole position. However Bottas was able to overtake both Vettel and Räikkönen at the start and maintained the lead throughout the race. Vettel initially struggled to match Bottas' pace but in the second half of the race, he was able to close the gap to Bottas, who was on an older set of tyres than Vettel. During the last lap, Vettel managed to get within a second of Bottas but it was too little too late as Bottas claimed his first win of his career. Räikkönen secured his first podium finish of the season by finishing in third and also had the fastest lap of the race. With 20% of the season completed, Vettel led the Drivers' Championship by 13 points over Hamilton and Ferrari trailed Mercedes in the Constructors' Championship by a single point.

=== European rounds and Canada ===
Ferrari were again very fast in Spain, despite major upgrades to the Mercedes cars. Vettel, who had a scare in Q1 when he was ordered to stop the car on the track, was on course to take pole. He was 3 tenths up on Hamilton's best lap in the second sector but lost time in the final sector and qualified second, 0.051 seconds behind Hamilton. Räikkönen qualified in fourth, 0.290 seconds off the pole time. In the race, Vettel got a better start than Hamilton from second and was into first position by turn 1. Max Verstappen, Kimi Räikkönen and Valtteri Bottas tried to go three-wide through turn 1 but Bottas clipped the inside kerb, hitting Räikkönen, who hit Verstappen. It ended both Räikkönen and Verstappen's race but Bottas was able to continue. Meanwhile, Vettel had stretched the gap to 2.2 seconds over Hamilton by the end of lap 1; the gap stayed around that margin till lap 14, when Vettel pitted from the lead for soft tyres, to cover off the undercut threat from Hamilton. He made easy work of passing Daniel Ricciardo but lost around 4 seconds trying to pass Bottas. Hamilton stayed out till lap 21 and then changed onto a set of mediums, rejoining 7 seconds back. Then the Virtual Safety Car was deployed for the Felipe Massa/Stoffel Vandoorne crash. Hamilton pitted just before the end of the VSC for softs, while Vettel pitted the next lap for mediums. They were side by side at turn 1, touched wheels and Hamilton was forced off the track and had to fall behind Vettel. He got past on lap 44 and won the race. He thus reduced the gap to Vettel in the Drivers' Championship to 6 points, while Mercedes extended their Constructors' lead to 8 points.

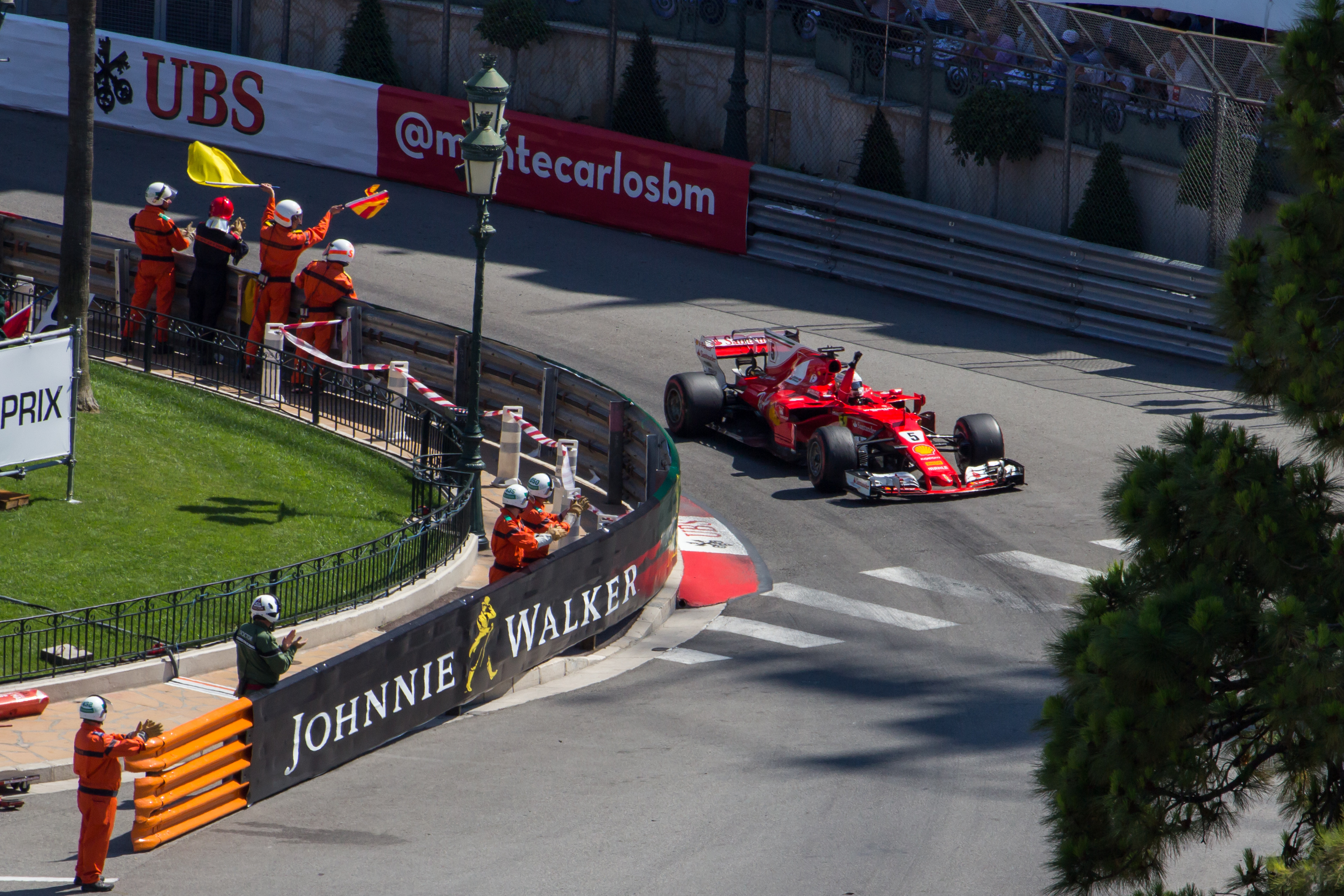
Vettel celebrates victory at the Monaco Grand Prix

At Monaco, both Mercedes cars struggled to find the right setup, while Ferrari were very fast yet again. Kimi Räikkönen got his first pole position since 2008 French Grand Prix by 0.043 seconds over Vettel, who himself was just 0.002 seconds clear of the Mercedes of Valtteri Bottas in third. But, crucially for the championship, Hamilton would start the race in thirteenth place. The two Ferraris stayed one and two until lap 34, when Räikkönen pitted to cover off the undercut from Bottas and Verstappen. Vettel stayed out for an extra five laps, putting in blistering lap times mostly quicker than those of Räikkönen on fresh supersofts. Vettel came in on lap 39, and rejoined ahead of Räikkönen, and led to the finish despite a safety car. After the race, talks arose that Ferrari had deliberately put Räikkönen on the slower strategy (Pirelli had said that ultrasofts could last an entire race distance, so the preferred strategy was to run on ultrasofts as long as possible) so that Vettel could maximize the points gain from Hamilton's lowly finish. This was the first Ferrari win at Monaco since 2001 and first Ferrari 1–2 finish since the infamous 2010 German Grand Prix. Ferrari retook the lead in the Constructors' Championship after both Mercedes cars had a poor race and Vettel increased his lead over Hamilton to 25 points.

Ferrari had a poor weekend in Canada. Vettel qualified in second splitting the two Mercedes cars and Räikkönen qualified in fourth ahead of the two Red Bulls. At the start Vettel lost positions to Bottas and a fast starting Verstappen, who jumped from fifth to second before turn 1. Verstappen made slight contact with Vettel which damaged Vettel's front wing. After the safety car period which was triggered by Carlos Sainz's Toro Rosso crashing into Felipe Massa's Williams, half of Vettel's front wing fell off his car and he had to pit 2 laps later which relegated him to last place. Vettel made a comeback drive and managed to overtake the two Force Indias of Sergio Pérez and Esteban Ocon, who were engaged in an inter-team battle which possibly cost them a chance for a podium finish, and finished in fourth; Räikkonen meanwhile was running in sixth but had a brake issue which forced him to limp home in seventh. This allowed Mercedes to retake the lead in the Constructors' Championship by 8 points.

At the Azerbaijan Grand Prix, Räikkönen managed to out-qualify Vettel as they lined up on the second row of the grid behind the two Mercedes. A race which saw many crashes and incidents, was also a centre of controversy for Vettel who, under the safety car, steered his car into Hamilton's in frustration as he claimed that Hamilton had brake checked him just before the restart which caused damage to his front wing. He was awarded a 10-second stop-go penalty for that move. He finished in fourth, ahead of Hamilton who had to make a mandatory pit stop to change his loose headrest. Three penalty points were added to Vettel's licence and he later admitted his mistake and apologised to Hamilton and the FIA which saw him avoid a possible race ban. Räikkönen collided with Bottas on the opening lap. He retired on lap 46 as a precaution to prevent the failure of his suspension which had received damage from the crash with Bottas.

In Austria, Vettel qualified in second ahead of Räikkönen in third. Vettel finished second behind Bottas even after a late challenge for victory, finishing just six tenths of a second behind the winner; Räikkönen meanwhile struggled for pace throughout the whole race and dropped behind Ricciardo and Hamilton to finish in fifth.

At the British Grand Prix, Ferrari seemed to struggle to keep up with the Mercedes as Hamilton was half a second quicker than Räikkönen in qualifying who lined up in 2nd ahead of Vettel in 3rd. During the start of the race, Vettel dropped behind Verstappen and was relegated to 4th but he regained his position by undercutting the Red Bull in the pits. On lap 49, running in 2nd place, Räikkönen's front left tyre lost pressure and he had to pit 2 laps from the end which saw him fall to 4th behind Vettel. On the next lap Vettel suffered with the same issue as his teammate which forced him to pit with 1 lap to go while in 3rd. This re-promoted Räikkönen to the podium and saw Vettel fall down to 7th and they finished in those positions. This allowed Hamilton, who won the fourth British Grand Prix in succession, to reduce the championship deficit to Vettel to just 1 point and allowed Mercedes to open up a gap of 55 points in the Constructors' Championship at the halfway point of the season.

After an appalling weekend in Silverstone, Ferrari looked to be struggling during Friday practice in Hungary; however both cars looked dominant on Saturday with Vettel scoring pole position from Räikkönen and being half a second quicker than Bottas and seven-tenths faster than Hamilton despite Mercedes holding a 0.5–0.7 seconds advantage over Ferrari in qualifying trim. On Sunday morning, Vettel's car developed a hydraulic problem which had to be rectified quickly before the race began. As the race began, it was apparent that Ferrari had the quickest car on circuit, although Vettel's pace started dropping after the initial stint. This was due to a steering wheel issues which occurred before the race began (media suspecting it was due to the quick hydraulic fix Ferrari did) which meant that Vettel was holding up Räikkönen but was allowing the Mercedes to close in on the Ferraris. Despite this, Vettel won the race from Räikkönen and was 12.462 seconds ahead of Bottas in 3rd place. As a result of this, Ferrari were 2nd in the Constructors' Championship, 39 points behind Mercedes, while Vettel was leading the Drivers' Championship by 14 points ahead of Hamilton going into the summer break with Bottas 33 points behind in 3rd and Räikkönen in 5th place 86 points behind Vettel.

Ferrari proved to be very competitive at the Belgian Grand Prix, considering that Spa was considered to be a track which suited Mercedes. Vettel qualified second while Räikkönen got P4. On Sunday Vettel had the better race pace and put Hamilton constantly under pressure. It was a close battle but he wasn't able to pass him. Räikkönen was fourth in the second Ferrari after a recovery drive. The Finn had been given a 10-second stop-go penalty for ignoring yellow flags when the luckless Max Verstappen retired.

Ferrari was off pace at their home Grand Prix in Italy. In a wet weather qualifying session Vettel and Räikkönen only managed to qualify in P7 and P8, 2.5 seconds off Hamilton's pole time. Due to engine penalties from both Red Bulls, they were promoted to P5 and P6. During the race both drivers couldn't go the pace from the Mercedes' drivers and even came under pressure from Red Bull. Vettel managed damage limitation by grabbing the final podium spot, giving the tifosi a reason to cheer. Räikkönen finished fifth, behind Ricciardo. At the end of the European rounds Vettel lost his lead in the Drivers' Championship. Going into the overseas races he was 3 points behind Hamilton while Ferrari was 62 points behind Mercedes in the Constructors' Championship.

=== Asian rounds ===
Ferrari managed to edge out the competition from Red Bull in qualifying at the Singapore Grand Prix. With a breathtaking lap Vettel grabbed pole position, beating Verstappen by over 3 tenths of a second. Räikkönen qualified fourth, behind Ricciardo but in front of Hamilton and Bottas. During the first ever wet-dry night race Vettel tried to chop Verstappen off in order to maintain his lead. He didn't see his Finnish teammate - who had a superb start - on his left which led to a chain reaction: Verstappen tried to evade the cut from Vettel but there was no room on the left because of the charging Räikkönen. Verstappen and Räikkönen hit each other and the Finn subsequently crashed into Vettel, ending the race for the three of them. It was the first time in F1 history that both Ferrari drivers were out on lap 1 of a race.

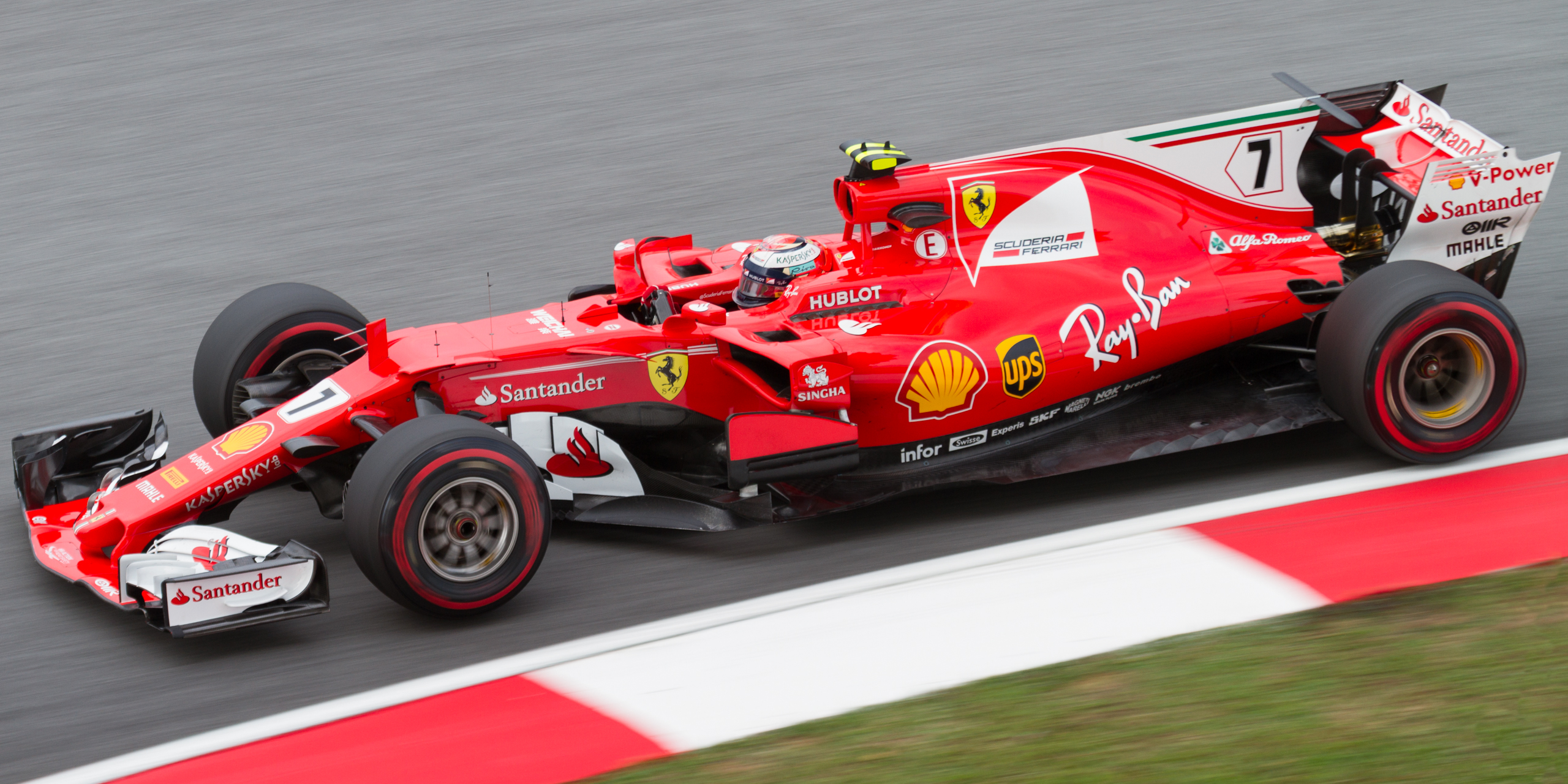
Räikkönen driving the SF70H during practice for the Malaysian Grand Prix

Ferrari were fastest again at the Malaysian Grand Prix but couldn't benefit from it. Vettel lost power during the end of FP3 and had his engine changed afterwards. In Q1 there were still major problems on Vettel's PU which couldn't be solved in time, making the German start from last on the grid. Räikkönen just missed out on pole position, qualifying behind Hamilton by less than half a tenth. Ferrari's woes continued on Sunday, as Raikkonen didn't even take the start after being pushed off his front-row slot and into the pits after experiencing power loss on his way to the grid. Vettel stormed back through the field and narrowly missed out on the podium, unable to pass Ricciardo for third.

During the weekend of the Japanese Grand Prix, trouble hit Ferrari yet again. After losing control in the Degner's curve in FP3, Räikkönen damaged his gearbox, earning him a five-place grid penalty. Räikkönen qualified sixth fastest and started the race from P10. Vettel meanwhile qualified third, half a second behind polesitter Hamilton. Due to an unscheduled gearbox change for Bottas, he got promoted to the first row. On the starting grid it became clear that Vettel's car suffered some kind of problem. When the race started Vettel didn't have full power and got overtaken by the drivers behind him. He retired after only 4 laps, all thanks to a faulty spark plug. It was his second retirement in 3 races. Räikkönen went wide on the first lap in a fight for position with Hülkenberg and only managed to salvage fifth place for the team. Leaving Asia, Ferrari lost a lot of ground in both championships. For Vettel, a three-point deficit to Hamilton quickly became a 59-point deficit in the space of just three races while Mercedes managed to extend their lead to 145 points in the WCC.

=== Final rounds ===
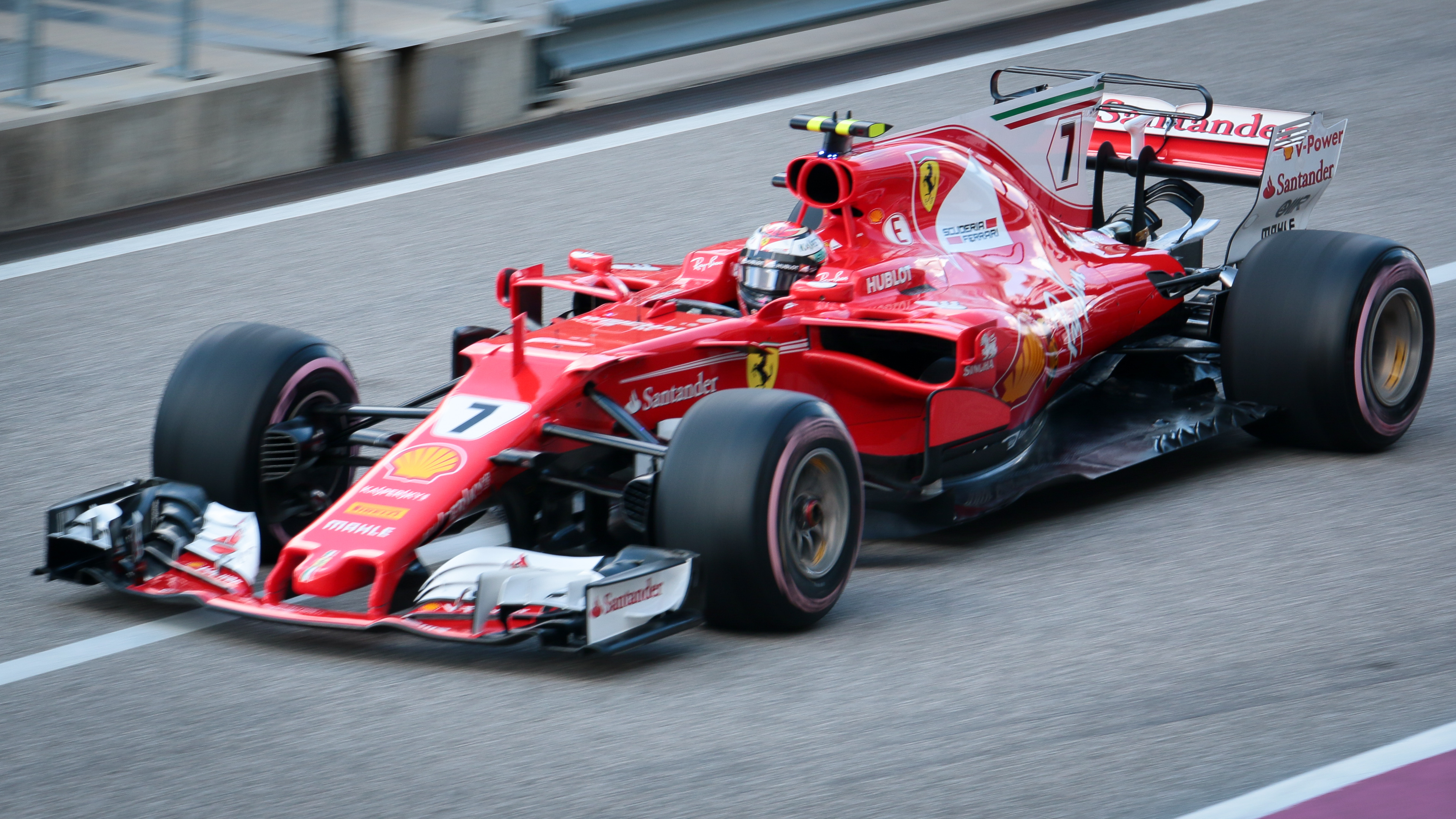
Räikkönen during the United States Grand Prix

Ferrari had a complicated Friday at the United States Grand Prix. The team elected to change Vettel's chassis after the German experienced problems in Friday's second practice session in Austin which limited his running to only 11 laps. During qualifying Vettel grabbed second place with a great last attempt in Q3, 2 tenths behind Hamilton. Räikkönen was unlucky: he scored exactly the same time as Ricciardo but he had to start from fifth because the Red Bull set the time first. Vettel passed Hamilton with a perfect start on Sunday but he couldn't pull a gap. Hamilton passed him on lap 6 and Vettel could not match his pace. He tried an alternative strategy with 2 pit stops but he had to settle for second place. Räikkönen had a great race and managed to overtake Bottas on track for the last podium place. He was overtaken by Verstappen on the last lap. As Verstappen received a five-second post-race penalty for exceeding track limits and gaining an advantage, it brought Vettel back to fourth place and allowed Ferrari their first double-podium finish since Hungary. Furthermore, Ferrari lost out in the Constructors' Championship after Mercedes scored their fourth consecutive crown.

One week later at the Mexican Grand Prix, Vettel was facing a 66-point deficit to Hamilton in the Drivers' Championship. In order to keep his title hopes alive, Vettel needed to finish no worse than second and have Hamilton finish tenth or worse. At the very end of Q3, Vettel edged Verstappen for pole position by less than 1 tenth of a second, his fourth of the season. Räikkönen could only manage fifth place, 3 quarters of a second behind his teammate. At the start of the race, Vettel was overtaken by both Verstappen and Hamilton. Vettel collided with Hamilton at the exit of turn 3, causing damage to both cars and forcing both drivers to pit with Vettel needing a new front wing and Hamilton needing to change tyres as a result of a puncture. Vettel rejoined the race at the back of the order but made an impressive recovery to fourth place, although it was not enough to keep his title hopes alive as Hamilton finished in ninth, securing his fourth Drivers' crown. Räikkönen got away poorly at the start, losing several positions but also made a recovery to third place.

The last two races were at Interlagos and Yas Marina. In Brazil, Vettel won the race after overtaking Bottas at the start, while Räikkönen finished 3rd. In Abu Dhabi, the German got the last podium place behind Bottas and Hamilton, and ahead his teammate. These results placed Ferrari in second place in the Constructors' Championship, whereas Vettel and Räikkönen finished 2nd and 4th in the Drivers' Championship.

== Livery ==
This was the final year for Santander, their long-term sponsor since 2010 until Santander returned to sponsor the team in 2022.

At the Italian Grand Prix, to celebrate their 70th anniversary, the logo was featured on the engine cover.

== Complete Formula One results ==
(key) (results in bold indicate pole position; results in italics indicate fastest lap)

Year	Entrant	Engine	Tyres	Drivers	Grands Prix																				Points	WCC
Year	Entrant	Engine	Tyres	Drivers	AUS	CHN	BHR	RUS	ESP	MON	CAN	AZE	AUT	GBR	HUN	BEL	ITA	SIN	MAL	JPN	USA	MEX	BRA	ABU	Points	WCC
2017	Ferrari	Ferrari 062	**P**																							
2017	Ferrari	Ferrari 062	**P**	Kimi Räikkönen	4	5	4	3	Ret	**2**	7	14^{†}	5	3	2	4	5	Ret	DNS	5	3	3	3	4	**522**	**2nd**
2017	Ferrari	Ferrari 062	**P**	Sebastian Vettel	1	2	1	**2**	2	1	4	4	2	7	**1**	2	3	**Ret**	4	Ret	2	**4**	1	3	**522**	**2nd**

^{†} Driver failed to finish the race, but was classified as they had completed greater than 90% of the race distance.
