= Pat Fry =

British motorsports engineer (born 1964)

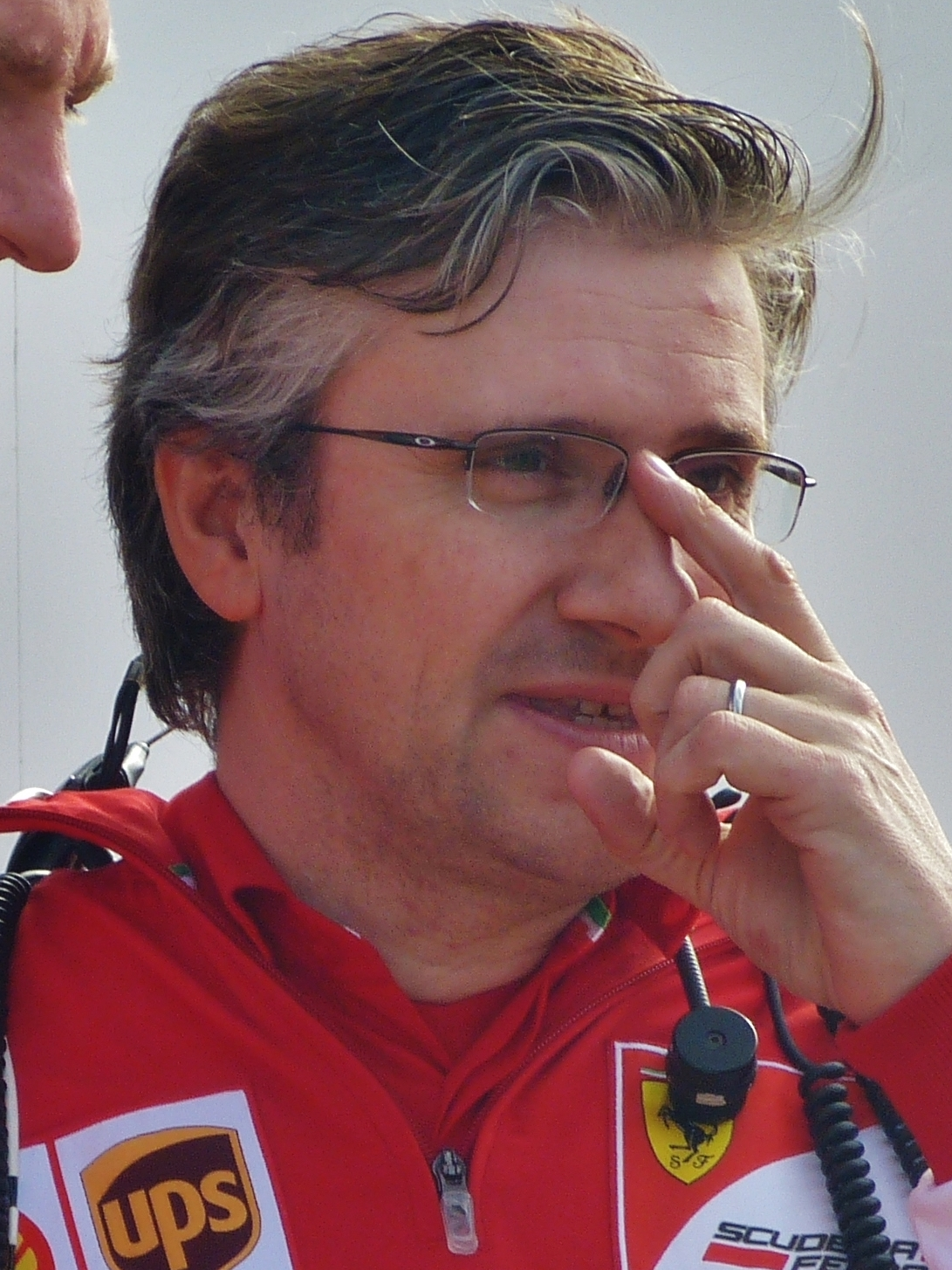
- Fry in 2014
- Born: 17 March 1964 (age 62); Shepperton, Surrey, UK
- Citizenship: British
- Education: Brooklands College; Richmond upon Thames College
- Occupation: Engineer
- Years active: 1980-present
- Employer: Williams F1 Team
- Known for: Formula One engineer
- Title: Chief Technical Officer
- Predecessor: Francois-Xavier Demaison
- Spouse(s): Kate Haberson (2002-present)

Pat Fry (born 17 March 1964) is a British Formula One engineer who since 2023, has served as the Chief Technical Officer for Williams Racing; he previously held positions at the Benetton, McLaren, Ferrari, Manor Racing, and Renault/Alpine Formula One teams.

== Early career ==
Fry was born in Shepperton, Surrey, England. After attempting several engineering courses, he became an apprentice at Thorn EMI in 1981. While at Thorn EMI, he completed a day-release course in electronics at the City of London Polytechnic. He moved onto Thorn's missile programmes, before deciding to leave the company in 1987 to pursue a career in motorsport.

== Motorsports career ==
=== Benetton (1987–1993) ===
Fry had an interest in building suspension systems for motorbikes in his spare time, and joined the Benetton Formula's research and development department in Witney, Oxfordshire, who at the time were working on active suspension systems. He moved to the test team and then to the team's Godalming research and development department. He returned to the test team in 1991, before being made Martin Brundle's race engineer in 1992.

=== McLaren (1993–2010) ===
In 1993, former Benetton colleague Giorgio Ascanelli persuaded Fry to join him at McLaren. His initial position was to work on active suspension systems, and run the McLaren test team; active suspension systems were banned by the sports governing body before the start of the 1994 season and so Fry moved to an engineering position in the race team. After a season as Mika Häkkinen's race engineer in 1995, he returned to the McLaren test team in 1996 despite rumours linking him with a move to Ferrari. He renewed his contract with McLaren in 1997 to become David Coulthard's race engineer, a role he held for four years. He moved to a tactical coordinating role in 2001, overseeing both the team's race cars. In 2002, he was promoted to the role of chief engineer of race development, and was responsible for the MP4-20 (Autosport's 2005 Racing Car of the Year), MP4-22 (Autosport's 2007 Racing Car of the Year), and MP4-24 chassis. On 14 May 2010, Fry departed from McLaren.

=== Ferrari (2010–2014) ===
On 22 June 2010, it was announced that Fry was to join the Ferrari team as assistant technical director from 1 July. On 4 January 2011, Ferrari announced that Fry had replaced Chris Dyer as head of race track engineering while retaining his assistant technical director position under Aldo Costa. The change was made following a tactical error in the final race of the 2010 season, the 2010 Abu Dhabi Grand Prix, which cost Fernando Alonso a chance at the title. On 24 May 2011, Costa was moved to an undefined position within the team and Fry was given the job as director of chassis, with the position of technical director being removed outright. Restructuring of Ferrari management made Fry's position one of three—the others being production director (filled by Corrado Lanzone) and electronics director (filled by Luca Marmorini)--to report directly to team boss Stefano Domenicali, who assumed the duties (if not the title) of technical director. On 23 July 2013, Ferrari announced that Lotus technical director James Allison would take over as chassis technical director as of 1 September; Fry remained with Ferrari as director of engineering (a newly created position) and continue to report directly to Domenicali alongside Allison and chief designer Nikolas Tombazis. Ferrari said Fry would leave the team in a restructuring announced 16 December 2014.

=== Manor Racing (2016–2017) ===
In January 2016, Fry joined Manor Racing as engineering consultant.

=== McLaren (2018–2019) ===
On 4 September 2018, McLaren announced Fry would join the team as engineering director in a temporary capacity while awaiting the arrival of full-time technical director James Key from gardening leave at Toro Rosso. Fry led the team in the process of developing the 2019 car, the McLaren MCL34. In July 2019, it was reported Fry had gone on gardening leave at the culmination of his temporary assignment.

=== Renault/Alpine (2020–2023) ===
On 2 November 2019, the Renault F1 Team announced that Fry would join the team for the 2020 season. Renault F1 Team was rebranded as Alpine F1 Team for the 2021 season. Before the 2022 season, Alpine named Fry as their chief technical officer. He oversaw all technical activities, set performance targets, and identified future technologies for the car.

=== Williams (2023–present) ===
At the 2023 Belgian Grand Prix, it was announced that Fry would be leaving Alpine to join Williams as their chief technical officer, starting in November 2023.

== Personal life ==
On 20 April 2002, Fry married Kate Habershon, a food editor and stylist who had worked in motorsport catering.
