= Daniele Casanova =

Italian engineer (1970–2018)

- Born: 1970
- Died: 13 October 2018 (aged 48)
- Citizenship: Italian
- Education: Polytechnic University of Milan, Cranfield University
- Occupation: Engineer
- Years active: 2000 - 2018
- Employer(s): Scuderia Ferrari; Lotus F1 Team; Renault F1 Team; Red Bull Racing
- Known for: Formula One engineer

Daniele Casanova (1970 – 13 October 2018) was an Italian Formula One engineer. He specialised in vehicle dynamics and simulation engineering and held senior engineering positions at Red Bull Racing, Renault F1 Team, Lotus F1 Team and Scuderia Ferrari.

== Career ==
Casanova was born in Rivanazzano, Italy. He studied mechanical engineering at the Polytechnic University of Milan, before doing a masters at the Delft University of Technology. He earned a PhD at Cranfield University with research focused on optimisation and simulation techniques related to motorsport engineering. Casanova began his motorsport career working in research and development with the Benetton Formula team, that transitioned into Renault F1 Team during his stint. He then moved to Toyota Racing as a performance engineer in 2003, remaining with the Japanese outfit for two seasons until he departed at the end of 2005.

Casanova joined Red Bull Racing for the 2006 season as Performance Engineer to Christian Klien, where he was responsible for car set-up, vehicle dynamics simulation, and acting as a liaison between the race engineering group and the design office. In 2007 he was assigned to Mark Webber, remaining in this role until the end of 2009 and contributing to the Australian’s first Formula One victory at the 2009 German Grand Prix. Casanova then returned to Enstone, where he was appointed Head of Vehicle Performance at Renault, later becoming Head of Performance Systems when the team was rebranded as the Lotus F1 Team. In this capacity he oversaw all aspects of vehicle performance, including development of the driver-in-the-loop simulator, tyre performance analysis, and control systems, while also contributing to race strategy and the integration of simulation tools with trackside operations.

In late 2014, Casanova joined Scuderia Ferrari, as part of a recruitment drive initiated by former Enstone man James Allison. He continued as Head of Performance Systems, applying modelling, simulation, and optimisation tools to support Ferrari’s Formula One programmes. He was responsible for the team's driver-in-loop simulator programme and race support operations.

Casanova died on 13 October 2018 following a cardiac arrest. He was survived by his wife, Lucy Luget, and their two children.
