= Luca Marmorini =

Italian motorsport engineer

- Born: 17 June 1961 (age 64)
- Citizenship: Italian

Luca Marmorini (born 17 June 1961) is an Italian engineer, who is the former head of the engine and electronics department at the Ferrari Formula One team.

== Career ==
Marmorini started his Formula One career with Ferrari in 1990, which he joined after completing a mechanical doctorate. He stayed with Ferrari until 1999, when he joined Toyota as it prepared to enter Formula One. After progressing to the position of technical director in charge of engines, he left Toyota on 19 January 2009, only to return to Ferrari on 6 October that year, replacing Frenchman Gilles Simon as head of the engine and electronics department.

He left the Scuderia Ferrari Team on 31 July 2014 and has been linked with Renault.

In 2022, Yamaha Racing MotoGP hired Marmorini. Marmorini had already warned internally of the need to consider moving away from the inline four-cylinder nature of the engine to the V4 configuration.
