= Loïc Bigois =

French Formula One aerodynamicist

Personal information
- Nationality: French
- Born: 19 September 1960 (age 65) Aix-en-Provence, France
- Education: Conservatoire national des arts et métiers
- Years active: 1990–present

Sport
- Sport: Formula One
- Team: Scuderia Ferrari

Loïc Bigois (born 19 September 1960) is a French Formula One aerodynamicist. He is currently the Head of Aerodynamic Operations at Scuderia Ferrari.

== Career ==
After studying engineering at the Conservatoire national des arts et métiers, Bigois relocated to Toulouse and began working in the aerospace industry. He was recruited by the Ligier F1 team in 1990 and for several years moved between the mid-field teams. In the late 1990s he returned to Ligier and remained as Chief Designer through the transition to Prost Grand Prix before being recruited by Minardi to become their Head of Aerodynamics in mid-2001.

In 2003 he was recruited by Williams as Aerodynamicist. Bigois worked alongside Jörg Zander who replaced Gavin Fisher as Chief Designer in September 2005. Both Bigois and Zander worked under Technical Director Sam Michael.

On 2 July 2007, it was announced that he had agreed to join the Honda Racing F1 team and as a result, was suspended by Williams.

In 2009, the team was reformed as Brawn GP but Bigois continued in the role of Head of Aerodynamics. Brawn GP subsequently won both the Drivers' and Constructors' championships, leading to Bigois being awarded the Dino Toso Racecar Aerodynamicist of the Year Award.

Bigois was the Head of Aerodynamics at Mercedes GP which bought out Brawn GP following their double championship winning season until he decided to leave the team in June 2012.

Following his departure from the Mercedes team, rumours emerging in Italian (Autosprint) and French (Auto Hebdo) newspapers linked Bigois with the Maranello-based team Scuderia Ferrari. Bigois would join Ferrari as Head of Aerodynamics before the end of the year, after a long period of gardening leave.
