= Giacomo Tortora =

Italian motorsports engineer

- Born: 28 January 1977 (age 49); Siena, Italy
- Citizenship: Italian
- Occupation: Formula One race engineer
- Employer: Mercedes-AMG Petronas F1
- Title: Car Design director

Giacomo Tortora (born in Siena, 28 January 1977) is an Italian Formula One engineer. He is currently the car design director of the Mercedes-AMG Petronas Formula One team.

== Career ==
As a teenager, Tortora attended the Lycée Français Charles De Gaulle in London, Liceo Ferraris in Taranto and Liceo Righi in Rome where he completed his Maturità Scientifica. In 1999 Tortora was awarded a 1st Class degree in Engineering Science from the University of Oxford, St. Peter's College. In 2002 he was awarded a PhD from the University of Oxford, St.Edmund Hall, for his research into Non-Linear Model Predictive Control under the supervision of Prof. Kouvaritakis and Prof. Clarke.

He joined McLaren Racing as a graduate in 2002, working in simulation development. During this time, under the supervision of Prof. Keith Glover, he came up with the first mathematically rigorous framework to compute laptime derivatives, a general method which then became the basis for wind tunnel components evaluation and for hybrid PUs efficient electrical energy deployment. In 2004 he became tyre programme R&D coordinator. During a period of intense competition between Michelin and Bridgestone,Tortora acted as the principal liaison between McLaren and Michelin on research, modelling and simulation projects, with specific emphasis in using the McLaren simulator for tyre development. Tortora was promoted to vehicle modelling team leader in 2007. In 2009 Tortora moved to aerodynamics, serving as trackside aerodynamics team leader. During this time he grew interested in Machine Learning and attended the 2009 Machine Learning Summer School in Cambridge. During the winter of 2009-2010 he was heavily involved in the successful implementation of the first F-Duct system.

In 2011, Tortora joined Scuderia Ferrari, where he initially served as head of vehicles dynamics, being promoted in 2012 to Head of Performance Development. In this role, he was responsible for vehicle dynamics, simulator, tyres, simulation and software development. He left the Scuderia in 2019 and joined Mercedes in 2020 as deputy chief designer. In April 2023, he was appointed Engineering Director, leading the Design Office and Labs. In March 2026 he was promoted to the role of Car Design Director.
