= Simone Resta =

Italian engineer

Personal information
- Nationality: Italian
- Born: 14 September 1970 (age 55) Imola, Emilia-Romagna, Italy
- Education: Mechanical engineering master's degree University of Bologna
- Occupation: Engineer
- Years active: 1998–present

Simone Resta (born 14 September 1970) is an Italian engineer who currently works as the Deputy Technical Director for Mercedes-AMG F1 Team. He previously worked at Scuderia Ferrari from 2001 to 2018, and from 2019 to 2020, as a senior design engineer, head of the R&D department, deputy chief design director and from 2014 to 2018, as Chief Designer, and later for Haas F1 Team as the technical director from 2021 to 2024.

== Career ==
Resta obtained the master's degree in mechanical engineering at the University of Bologna in 1995, and worked for Minardi in the research and development department since 1998.

In 2001, he moved to Scuderia Ferrari as a senior design engineer. In 2006, he became the head of the research and development department before being promoted to the deputy chief design director in 2012. In 2014, he was appointed by Sergio Marchionne as the team's new chief designer.

On 28 May 2018, Resta left Ferrari to join Alfa Romeo (then known as Sauber), working as the team's technical director. However, he returned to Ferrari on 1 August 2019.

Resta moved to Haas F1 Team for the 2021 Formula One season, as part of a tightening in the technological relationship between Haas and Ferrari. Following the departure of Guenther Steiner in January 2024, Resta also left the team.

On 20 March, Resta was announced to be joining Mercedes-AMG Petronas F1 Team as a strategic development director. This move reunited him with James Allison, who previously was Resta's technical director in Ferrari.
