= Ferrari F2001 =

2001 Formula One racing car by Ferrari

Ferrari F2001 Ferrari F2001B
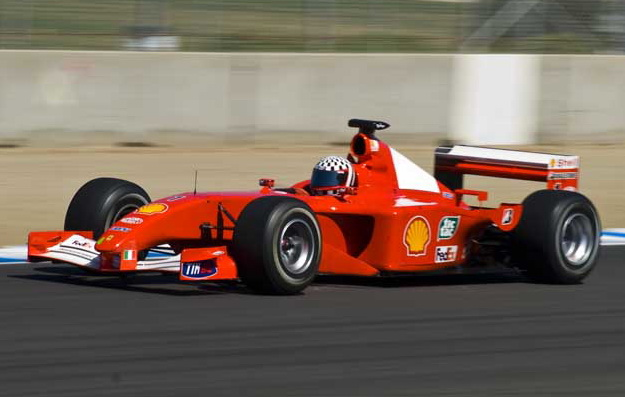
- The F2001 being driven in an exhibition at Laguna Seca
- Category: Formula One
- Constructor: Ferrari
- Designers: Ross Brawn (Technical Director); Rory Byrne (Chief Designer); Ignazio Lunetta (Head of R&D); Aldo Costa (Head of Chassis Design); Marco Fainello (Head of Vehicle Dynamics); Roberto Dalla (Head of Electronics); Nikolas Tombazis (Head of Aerodynamics); James Allison (Chief Aerodynamicist); Paolo Martinelli (Engine Technical Director); Gilles Simon (Engine Chief Designer)
- Predecessor: F1-2000
- Successor: F2002

Technical specifications
- Chassis: Moulded carbon fibre & Honeycomb composite structure
- Suspension (front): Independent suspension, pushrod activated torsion springs
- Suspension (rear): Independent suspension, pushrod activated torsion springs
- Length: 4,460 mm (176 in)
- Width: 1,800 mm (71 in)
- Height: 1,100 mm (43 in)
- Engine: Ferrari Tipo 050 , 3.0 L (3,000 cc; 183 cu in) , 90° V10, naturally-aspirated, mid-engine, rear-wheel-drive layout
- Transmission: 7-speed semi-automatic sequential Limited-slip Differential gearbox + reverse
- Power: 825 horsepower (615 kW) @ 17,300 rpm
- Weight: 600 kg (1,323 lb)
- Fuel: Shell Fuel
- Lubricants: Shell Lubricant
- Brakes: Carbon brake discs, pads and calipers
- Tyres: Bridgestone BBS Racing Wheels : 13"

Competition history
- Notable entrants: Scuderia Ferrari Marlboro
- Notable drivers: 1. (Germany) Michael Schumacher; 2. (Brazil) Rubens Barrichello
- Debut: 2001 Australian Grand Prix
- First win: 2001 Australian Grand Prix
- Last win: 2002 Australian Grand Prix
- Last event: 2002 Brazilian Grand Prix
Races	Wins	Podiums	Poles	F/Laps
20	10	26	13	3
- Constructors' Championships: 2001, 2002
- Drivers' Championships: 2001, 2002

The Ferrari F2001 was a highly successful Formula One car that the Ferrari team competed with for the 2001 Formula One season. The chassis was designed by Rory Byrne, Ignazio Lunetta, Aldo Costa, Marco Fainello, Nikolas Tombazis and James Allison with Ross Brawn playing a vital role in leading the production of the car as the team's Technical Director and Paolo Martinelli assisted by Giles Simon (engine design and development) and Pino D'Agostino (engine operations).

== Overview ==
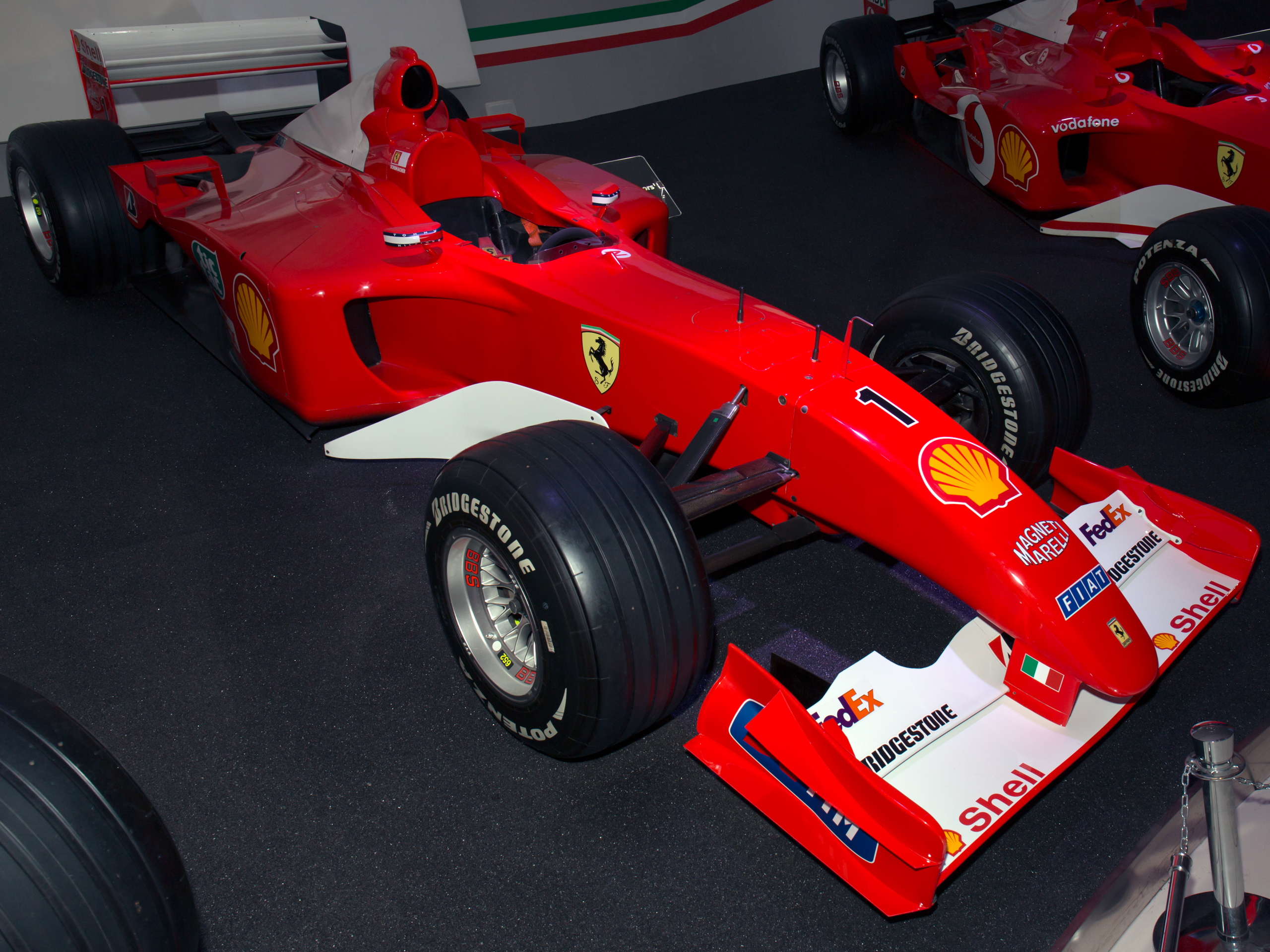
F2001 at the Museo Ferrari

The F2001 was designed around new regulation changes which mandated a higher-mounted front wing assembly to reduce downforce. This resulted in a distinctive 'droopsnoot' nose section and spoon-shaped front wing. The season also saw the re-introduction of traction and launch control systems, therefore the car and its suspension were designed with this in mind.

Being somewhat of a departure over previous Brawn/Byrne Ferrari designs, the car was based more on McLaren's design thinking. A test with the 2000 car-which featured a high nose-that was adapted to the new regulations made that design impractical, so a low nose was adopted instead. However, the car did feature Ferrari trademarks, such as the periscope exhausts pioneered by the team in 1998 and the small bargeboards which were a feature of its predecessors. The F2001 used the same basic gearbox and internal layout as its predecessors, however the aerodynamic efficiency and tyre wear were improved considerably over the F300 (1998), F399 (1999) and F1-2000 (2000).

== Season performance ==
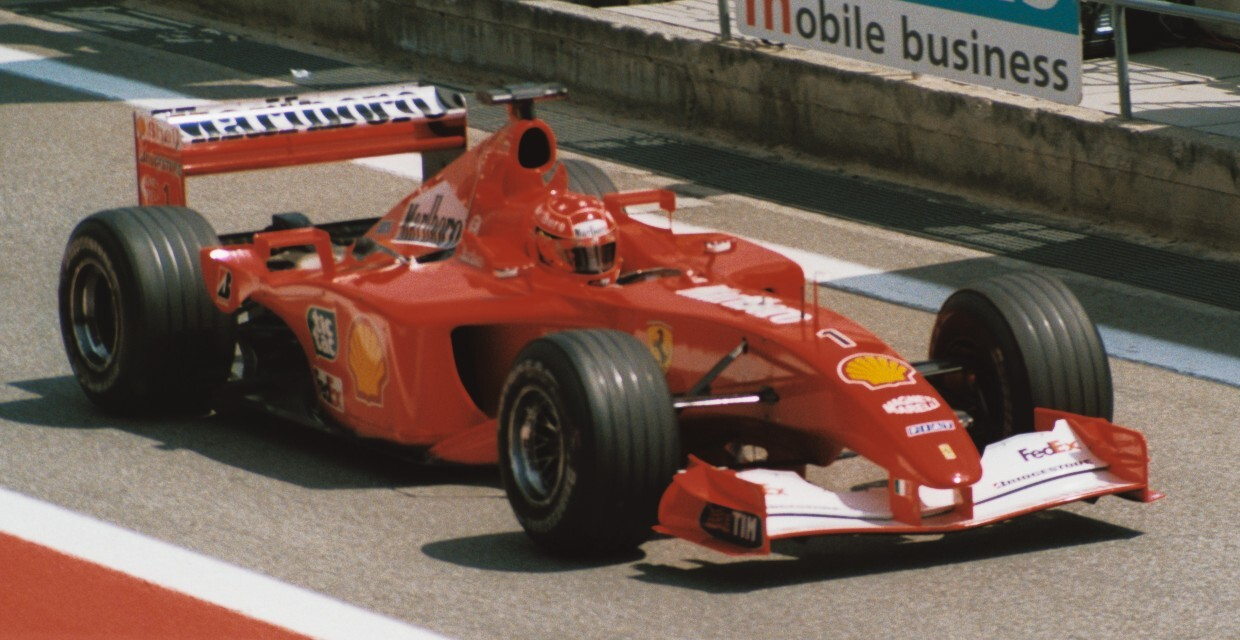
Michael Schumacher driving the F2001 at the 2001 Spanish Grand Prix.

The season would turn out to be easy for Michael Schumacher, who took nine victories and his fourth world championship—scoring a then-record 123 points. He also surpassed Alain Prost's record for most Grand Prix wins during the year. He failed to finish only twice, but his teammate Rubens Barrichello had bad luck and looked poised to take wins himself, being hindered only by unreliability. All the while, Ferrari won its third straight Constructors' Championship.

The car was updated before the season finale in Japan, ostensibly to test 2002 components in race conditions. The updated F2001 was still competitive at the beginning of the 2002 season and Schumacher took the car's final win at the Australian Grand Prix before it was replaced by the all-conquering F2002 from the third race (only for Schumacher) and fourth race onwards (for Barrichello). Overall, the F2001 took ten wins, thirteen pole positions, three fastest laps and 197 points throughout its lifespan.

== F2001B ==
For the opening rounds of the 2002 season, Ferrari ran an evolution of the F2001, denoted the F2001B, before the new Ferrari F2002 was adopted from the third round of the 2002 campaign. The car's chassis, designated as Ferrari 215, was developed by Ferrari's chief designer, Rory Byrne. It featured a lightweight and aerodynamically efficient design, which contributed to its impressive performance on the track. The F2001B was powered by a Ferrari Tipo 051 engine, a 3.0-liter V10 configuration.

The Ferrari F2001B made its debut at the 2002 Australian Grand Prix, held at the Melbourne Grand Prix Circuit. Michael Schumacher demonstrated the car's capabilities by securing a strong qualifying position. While he did not achieve pole position (which went to his teammate Rubens Barrichello), Schumacher put up a competitive performance during the race and ultimately emerged as the victor. This triumph marked a promising start to the season for both Schumacher and the Ferrari team.

The second race of the season took place at the Sepang International Circuit in Malaysia. Schumacher qualified on pole position. However, during the first corner of the race, Schumacher was involved in a collision with Juan Pablo Montoya, which affected his chances of securing a higher finishing position. Despite the setback, Schumacher managed to finish in third place, earning valuable points for the championship.

== Sponsorship and livery ==
This was the final year for FedEx and Tic Tac as the team would not renew these sponsorships.

Ferrari used Marlboro advertising on their cars, except in France, Great Britain, Italy and United States. At the Italian Grand Prix, the sponsors were removed and the nose cone was painted black in response to the September 11 attacks. At the United States Grand Prix, the bargeboard of the cars and Schumacher's helmet featured the American flag.

== Complete Formula One results ==
(key) (results in bold indicate pole position; results in italics indicate fastest lap)

Year	Entrant	Engine	Tyres	Drivers	1	2	3	4	5	6	7	8	9	10	11	12	13	14	15	16	17	Points	WCC
2001	Scuderia Ferrari Marlboro	Ferrari 050 V10	B		AUS	MAL	BRA	SMR	ESP	AUT	MON	CAN	EUR	FRA	GBR	GER	HUN	BEL	ITA	USA	JPN	**179**	1st
2001	Scuderia Ferrari Marlboro	Ferrari 050 V10	B	(Germany) Michael Schumacher	**1**	**1**	**2**	Ret	**1**	**2**	1	**2**	**1**	1	**2**	Ret	**1**	1	4	**2**	**1**	**179**	1st
2001	Scuderia Ferrari Marlboro	Ferrari 050 V10	B	(Brazil) Rubens Barrichello	3	2	Ret	3	Ret	3	2	Ret	5	3	3	2	2	5	2	15	5	**179**	1st
2002	Scuderia Ferrari Marlboro	Ferrari 050 V10	B		AUS	MAL	BRA	SMR	ESP	AUT	MON	CAN	EUR	GBR	FRA	GER	HUN	BEL	ITA	USA	JPN	**221***	1st
2002	Scuderia Ferrari Marlboro	Ferrari 050 V10	B	(Germany) Michael Schumacher	1	**3**																**221***	1st
2002	Scuderia Ferrari Marlboro	Ferrari 050 V10	B	(Brazil) Rubens Barrichello	**Ret**	Ret	Ret															**221***	1st

* 14 points scored with the F2001, 215 with the Ferrari F2002.

Awards
Preceded by Ferrari F1-2000	Autosport; Racing Car Of The Year; 2001	Succeeded by Ferrari F2002
