= Ferrari F1-2000 =

2000 Formula One racing car by Ferrari

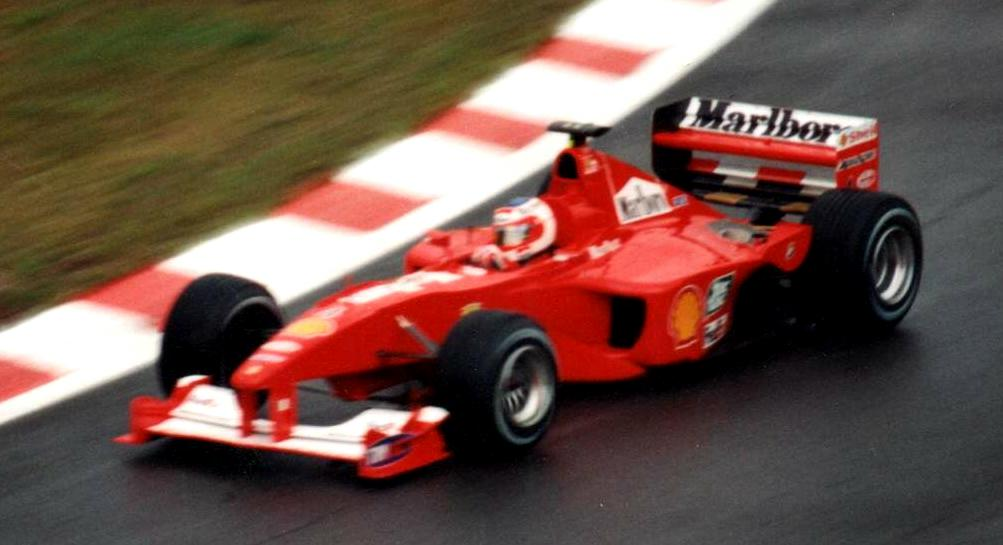
- Rubens Barrichello driving the F1-2000 at the 2000 Belgian Grand Prix
- Category: Formula One
- Constructor: Ferrari
- Designers: Ross Brawn (Technical Director); Rory Byrne (Chief Designer); Giorgio Ascanelli (Head of R&D); Aldo Costa (Head of Chassis Design); Marco Fainello (Head of Vehicle Dynamics); Nikolas Tombazis (Head of Aerodynamics); James Allison (Chief Aerodynamicist); Paolo Martinelli (Engine Technical Director); Gilles Simon (Engine Chief Designer)
- Predecessor: F399
- Successor: F2001

Technical specifications
- Chassis: Carbon-fibre and honeycomb composite structure
- Suspension (front): Double-wishbone pushrod suspension
- Suspension (rear): Double-wishbone pushrod suspension
- Engine: mid-mounted Ferrari Tipo 049 (3.0L) 2,996.6 cc Normally Aspirated 90-degree V10
- Transmission: Ferrari seven-speed longitudinal semi-automatic sequential
- Power: 805-815 hp @ 17,300 RPM
- Fuel: Shell
- Tyres: Bridgestone

Competition history
- Notable entrants: Scuderia Ferrari Marlboro
- Notable drivers: 3. (Germany) Michael Schumacher; 4. (Brazil) Rubens Barrichello
- Debut: 2000 Australian Grand Prix
- First win: 2000 Australian Grand Prix
- Last win: 2000 Malaysian Grand Prix
- Last event: 2000 Malaysian Grand Prix
| Races | Wins | Podiums | Poles | F/Laps |
|---|---|---|---|---|
| 17 | 10 | 21 | 10 | 5 |
- Constructors' Championships: 1 (2000)
- Drivers' Championships: 1 (2000, Michael Schumacher)

The Ferrari F1-2000 was the Formula One racing car with which the Ferrari team competed in the 2000 Formula One World Championship.

== Design ==
The chassis was designed by Rory Byrne, Giorgio Ascanelli, Aldo Costa, Marco Fainello, Nikolas Tombazis and James Allison with Ross Brawn playing a vital role in leading the production of the car as the team's Technical Director and Paolo Martinelli assisted by Giles Simon (engine design and development) and Pino D'Agostino (engine operations). The car was a direct development of the F300 and F399 from the previous two seasons, using the same basic gearbox and a new engine with a wider V-angle (90 degrees vs. 80 degrees in the 048 engine); this new wider angle improved and lowered the centre of gravity of the car. It also featured improved aerodynamics over the F399 most noticeably a flatter underside of the nose area, which put it on par with that year's McLaren MP4/15.

== Season performance ==
The new car had improved cooling over its predecessors and much smaller, more rounded sidepods to improve airflow. Detail changes had been made to the weight distribution to improve handling and make the car as light as possible. Despite the improvements, the F1-2000 used its tyres harder than the McLaren, which was still faster overall. Andrew Benson of BBC Sport stated that McLaren had the best and fastest car for the third straight year, concluding that the "F1-2000 was not quite a match for the McLaren-Mercedes MP4/15, but in Schumacher's hands it was close enough, and on occasions plainly faster".

The Ferrari car underwent constant development. The angled front wing was replaced with a more conventional flat plane wing at the United States Grand Prix and larger bargeboards were fitted in time for the French Grand Prix. For the last 2 rounds of the season, a new front wing and end plates that did away with the swept wing from the F399 was adopted.

Despite a mid season slump which saw three consecutive retirements, Michael Schumacher drove the F1-2000 to his third World Drivers' Title and Ferrari's first after a 21 year title drought. It also defended Ferrari's constructors' crown, and signified the start of the team's dominance throughout the first half of the decade.

== Livery ==
Ferrari used the Marlboro logos, except at the British, French and United States Grands Prix. While the reasons for the ban in the United Kingdom and France was due to a ban on tobacco advertising, the reasons for the lack of Marlboro sponsorship in the U.S. was due to a special law that prevented tobacco sponsorship of more than one racing series in a year (Penske already had sponsorship from Marlboro in CART in 2000).

== In video games ==
The F1-2000 was featured in F1 2000, Formula One 2000, F1 Career Challenge and F1 2020 as downloadable content for the "Deluxe Schumacher Edition".

== Gallery ==
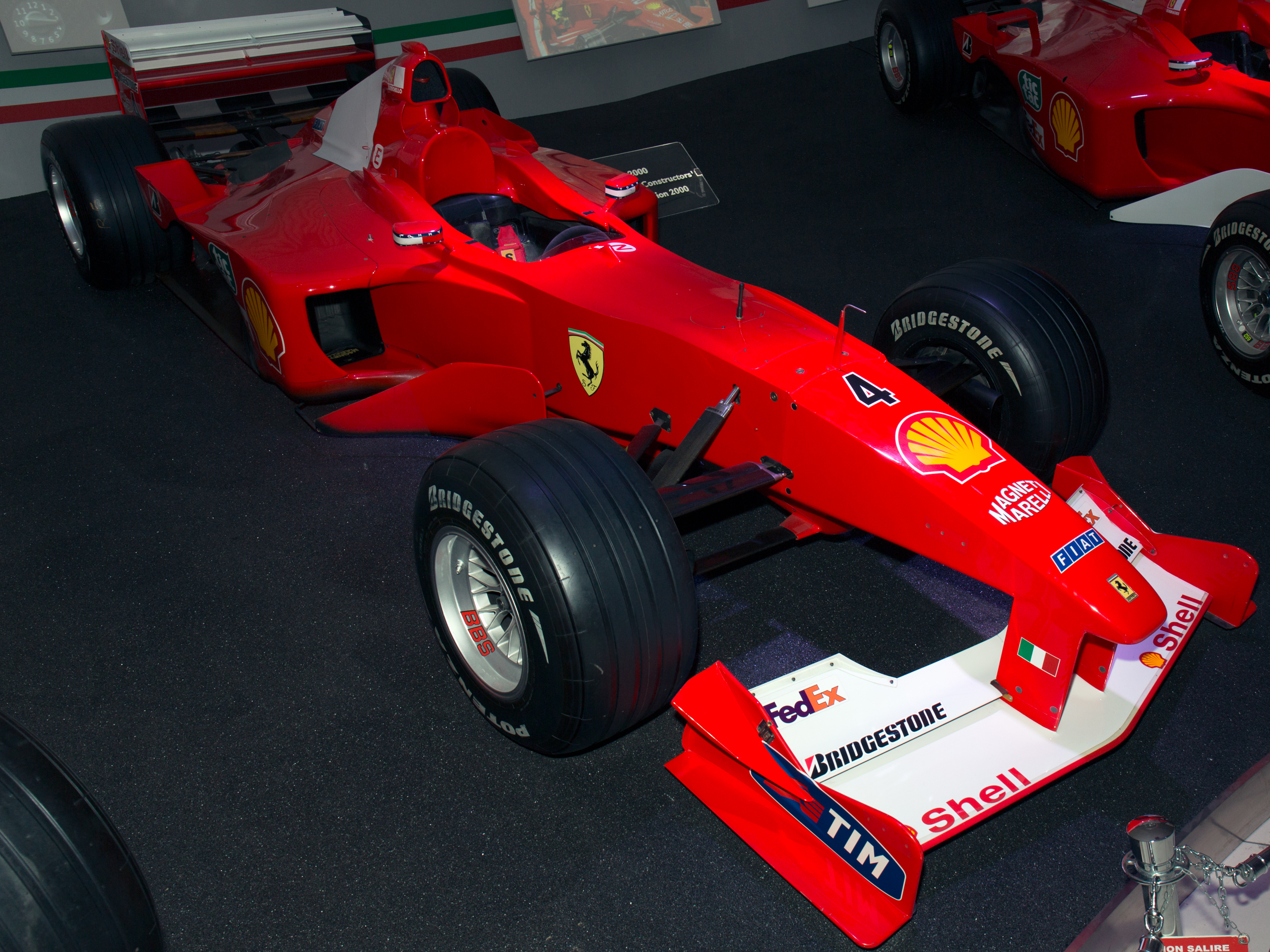
Ferrari F1-2000 in Museo Ferrari

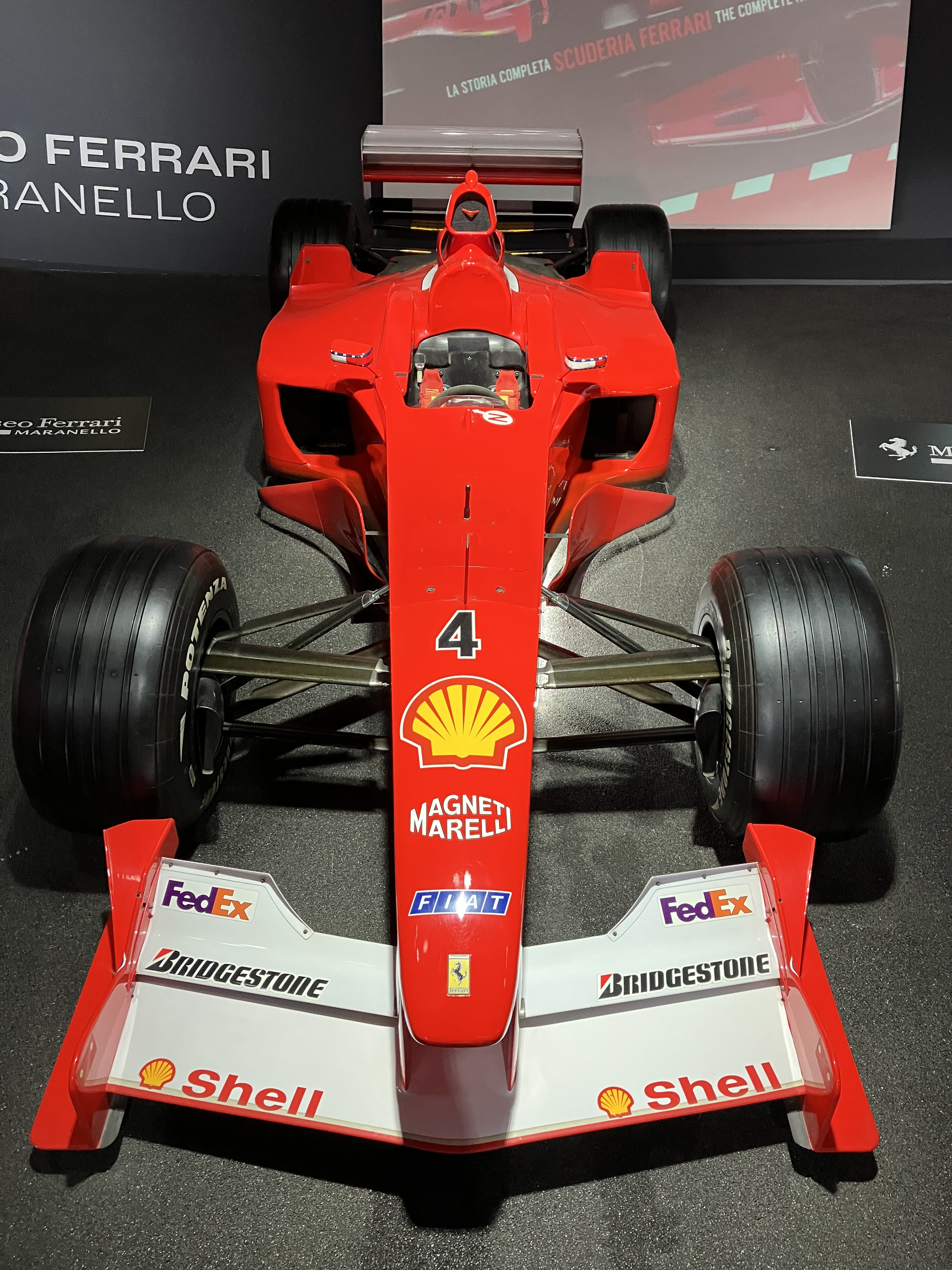

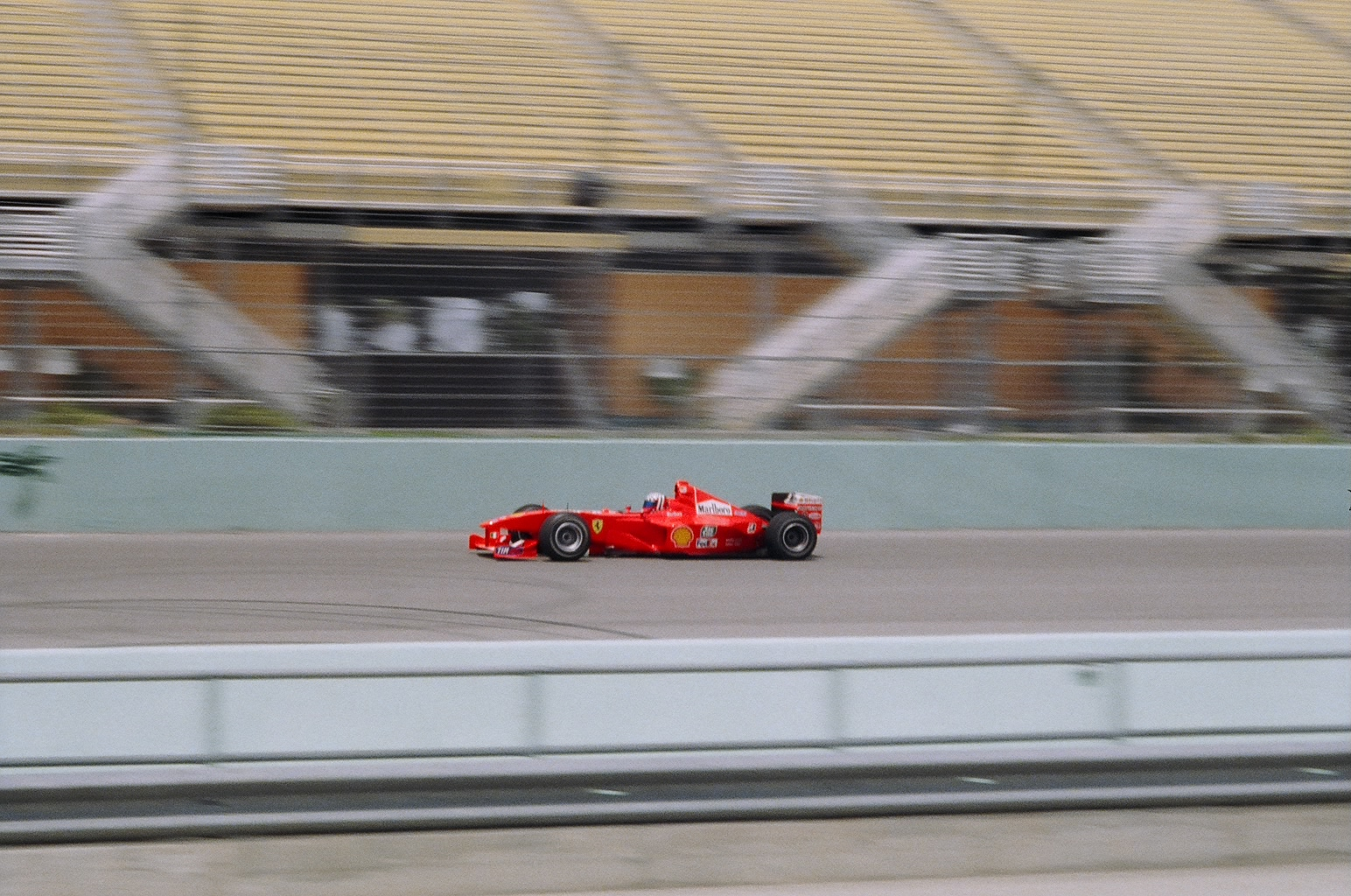
The F2000 chassis at the 2006 Ferrari Challenge at the Homestead-Miami Speedway

== Complete Formula One results ==
(key) (results in bold indicate pole position; results in italics indicate fastest lap)

| Year | Team | Engine | Tyres | Drivers | 1 | 2 | 3 | 4 | 5 | 6 | 7 | 8 | 9 | 10 | 11 | 12 | 13 | 14 | 15 | 16 | 17 | Points | WCC |
|---|---|---|---|---|---|---|---|---|---|---|---|---|---|---|---|---|---|---|---|---|---|---|---|
| 2000 | Ferrari | Ferrari 049 V10 | **B** | | AUS | BRA | SMR | GBR | ESP | EUR | MON | CAN | FRA | AUT | GER | HUN | BEL | ITA | USA | JPN | MAL | **170** | **1st** |
| 2000 | Ferrari | Ferrari 049 V10 | **B** | (Germany) Michael Schumacher | 1 | 1 | 1 | 3 | **5** | 1 | **Ret** | **1** | **Ret** | Ret | Ret | **2** | 2 | **1** | **1** | **1** | **1** | **170** | **1st** |
| 2000 | Ferrari | Ferrari 049 V10 | **B** | (Brazil) Rubens Barrichello | 2 | Ret | 4 | **Ret** | 3 | 4 | 2 | 2 | 3 | 3 | 1 | 4 | Ret | Ret | 2 | 4 | 3 | **170** | **1st** |

Awards
| Preceded by McLaren MP4/14 | Autosport; Racing Car Of The Year; 2000 | Succeeded by Ferrari F2001 |
