= Ferrari V10 engine =

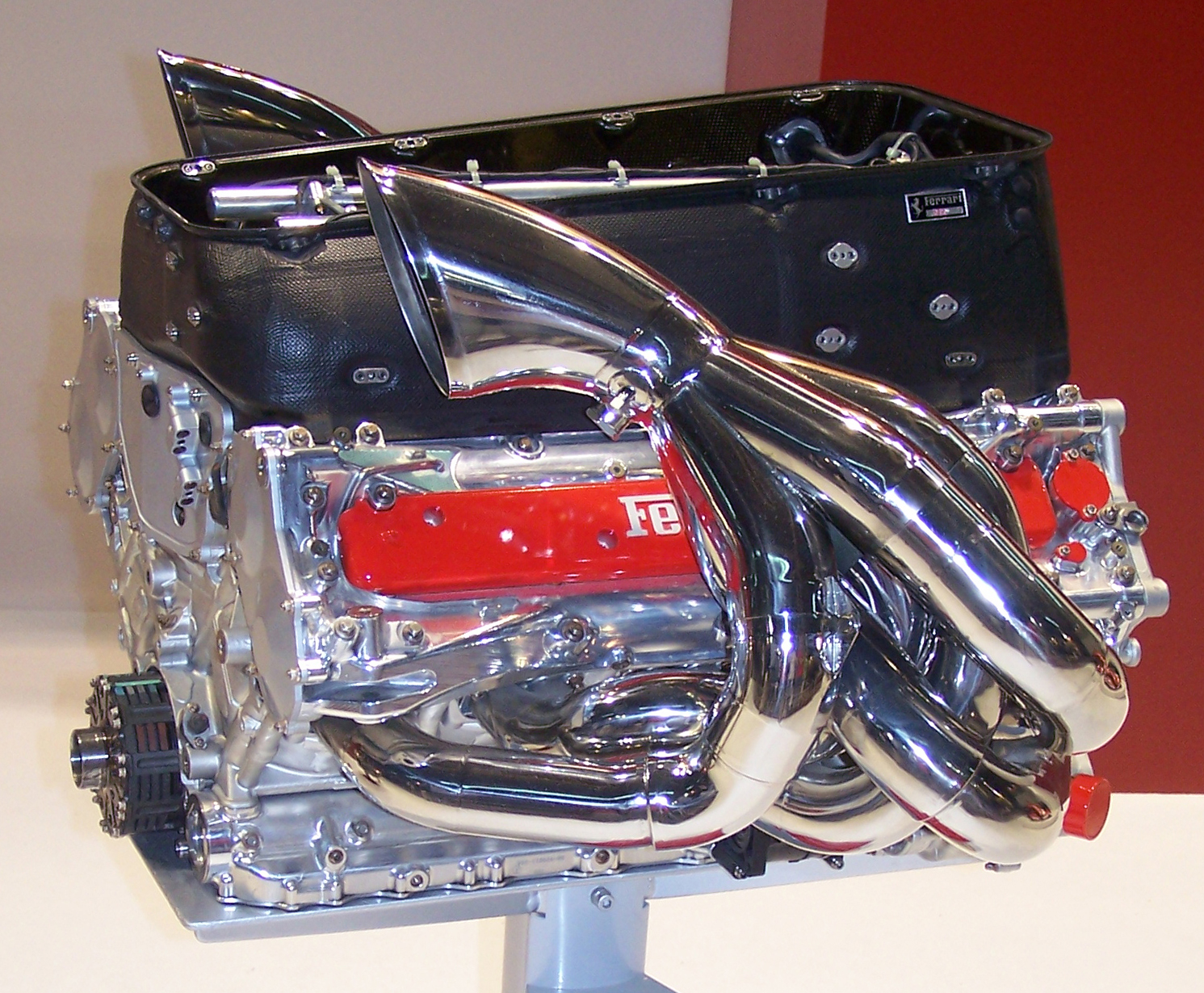

Overview
- Manufacturer: (Italy) Ferrari
- Designer: Paolo Martinelli (department head); Osamu Goto (chief designer) (1996–1997); Gilles Simon (chief designer) (1998–2005)
- Production: 1996–2005

Layout
- Configuration: 75°-80°-90° V10
- Displacement: 3.0 L (183.1 cu in)
- Cylinder bore: 90 mm (3.5 in); 92 mm (3.6 in); 94 mm (3.7 in); 96 mm (3.8 in); 98 mm (3.9 in)
- Piston stroke: 47.1 mm (1.85 in); 45.08 mm (1.775 in); 43.19 mm (1.700 in); 41.4 mm (1.63 in); 39.75 mm (1.565 in)
- Valvetrain: 40-valve, DOHC, four-valves per cylinder
- Compression ratio: 13.0:1/17.0:1

Combustion
- Fuel system: Electronic fuel injection
- Fuel type: Shell V-Power (Ferrari) and Petronas (Sauber) unleaded racing gasoline
- Oil system: Dry sump
- Cooling system: Water-cooled

Output
- Power output: 715–940 hp (533–701 kW; 725–953 PS)
- Torque output: approx. 241.5–305 lb⋅ft (327–414 N⋅m)

Dimensions
- Dry weight: 90–120 kg (198.4–264.6 lb)

Chronology
- Predecessor: Tipo 044/1
- Successor: Ferrari V8 F1

Ferrari manufactured a series of 3.0-litre, naturally-aspirated, V10 racing engines, exclusively for their Formula One race cars, between 1996 and 2005. They chose a V10 engine configuration, because it offered the best compromise between power and fuel efficiency; the V12 was more powerful but less efficient while the V8 was less powerful but more economical. They switched to 2.4-litre naturally-aspirated V8 engine configuration for 2006.

Over its decade-long evolution, power levels varied; from 715 hp (533 kW; 725 PS) at 15,500 rpm in 1996, to over 900 horsepower, around 935 hp (697 kW; 948 PS) at 19,000 rpm, toward the end of the 2005 season. The Tipo 05 series of engines, produced between 2001 and 2005, was officially stated to produce between 825 hp (615 kW; 836 PS) at 17,800 rpm, and 865 hp (645 kW; 877 PS) at 18,300 rpm. In qualifying mode, these engine were reputed to develop up to, or at times over, 900 horsepower (670 kW) at 19,000 rpm.

== First generation: Tipo 04x engine (1996–2000) ==
=== Tipo 046/046/2 (1996–1997) ===
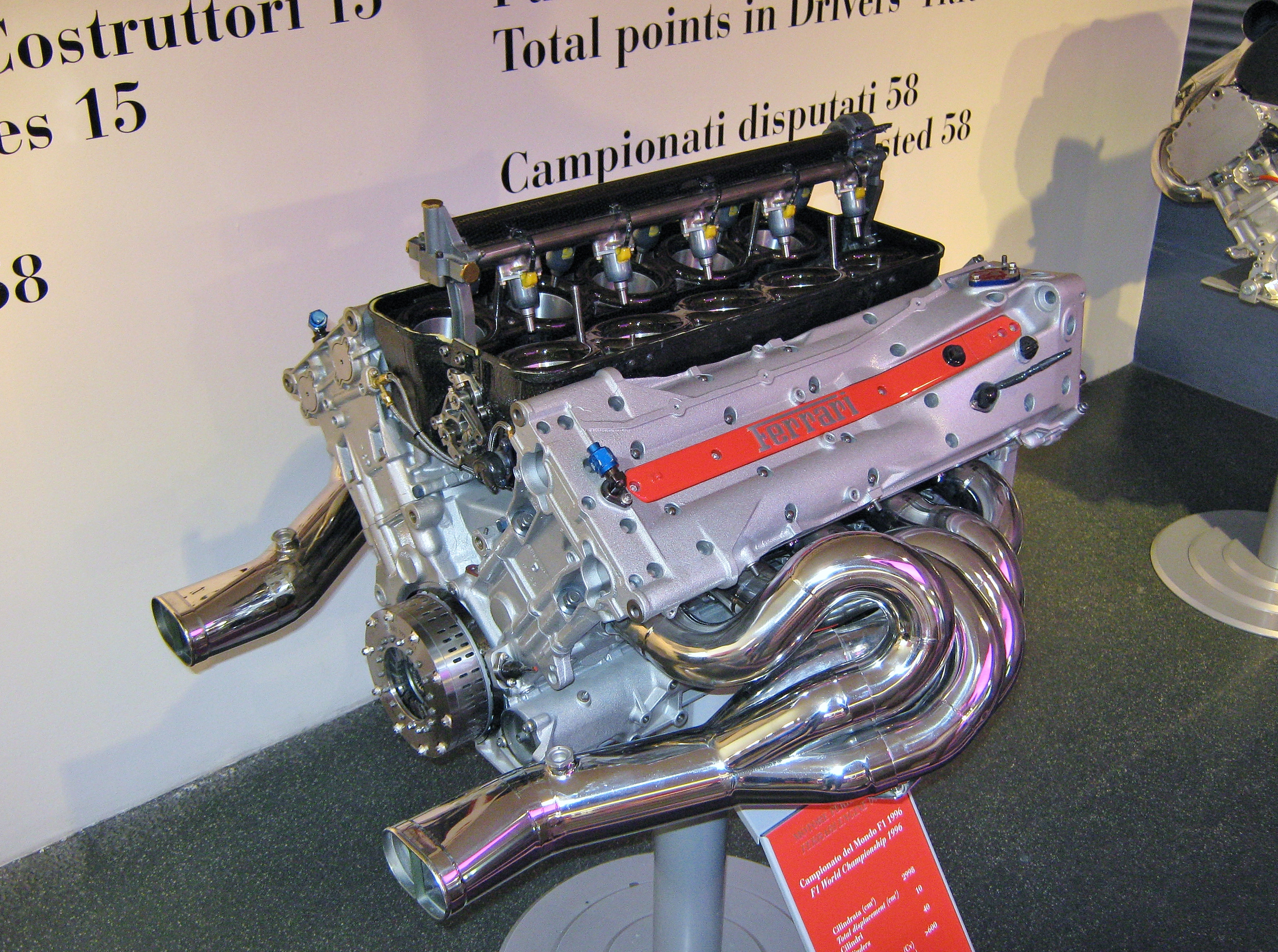
1996 Tipo 046 engine.

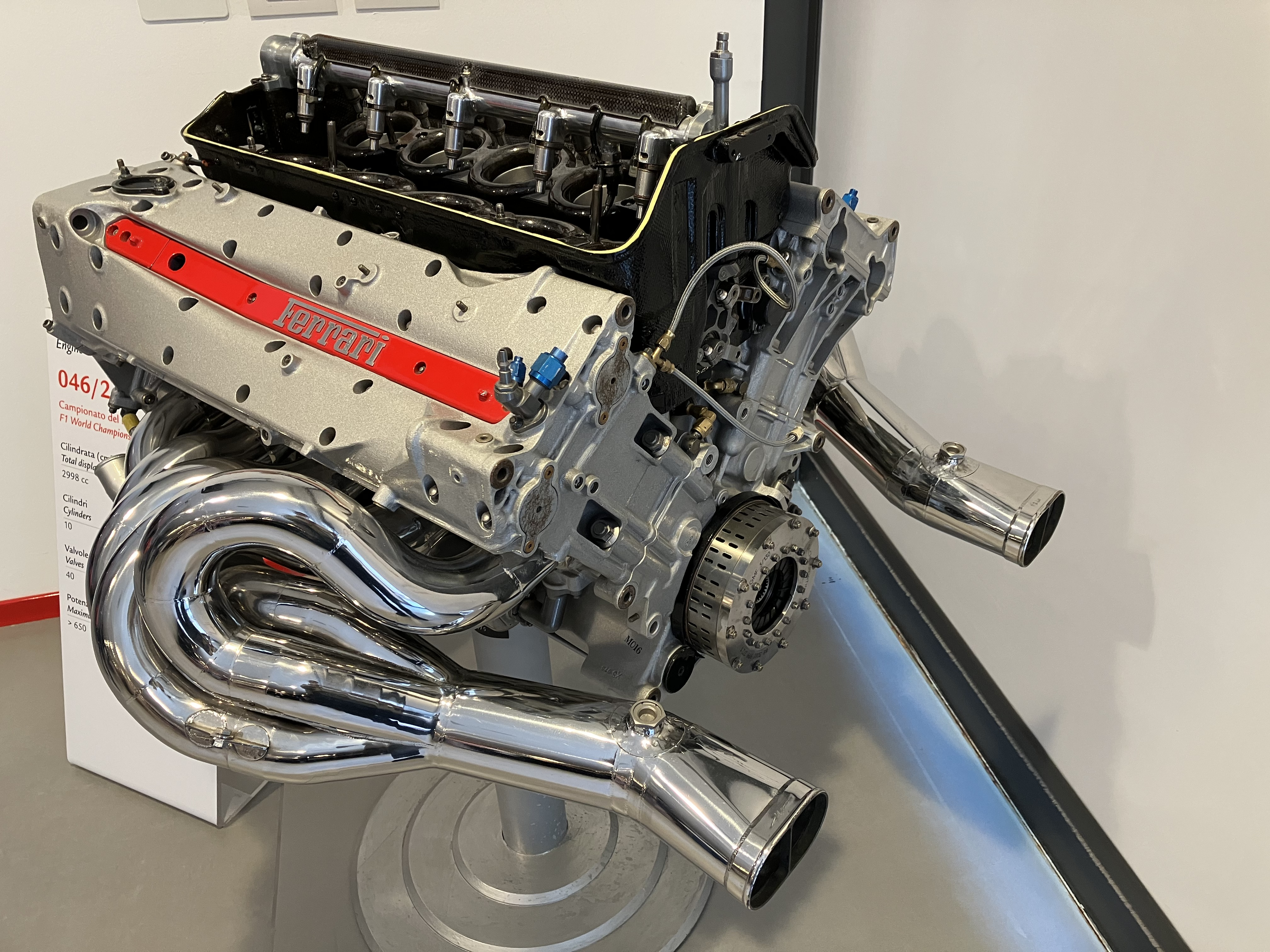
1997 Tipo 046-2 at the Museo Ferrari

This Tipo 046 engine is notable for being the first to use the then more conventional V10 engine format, because a V10 engine offered the best compromise between power and fuel efficiency; the V12 was powerful but thirsty while the V8 was weaker but economical. The engine was also called the 310. It was engineered by former Honda technician Osamu Goto. The engine is a 75-degree V10; and produces 715 hp at 15,550 rpm. The engine itself weighs 120 kg (265 lb).

==== Specifications ====
Weight: 120 kg
Engine Configuration: 75° V10
Bore: 90mm
Stroke: 47.1mm
Valves: 4 per cylinder
Displacement: 2998.1 cc
No. of revolutions: Max. 16,000–17,000 rpm
Power: ~ 533 kW (715 hp)
Power/liter: 238 hp/L

=== Tipo 047/B/C (1998) ===
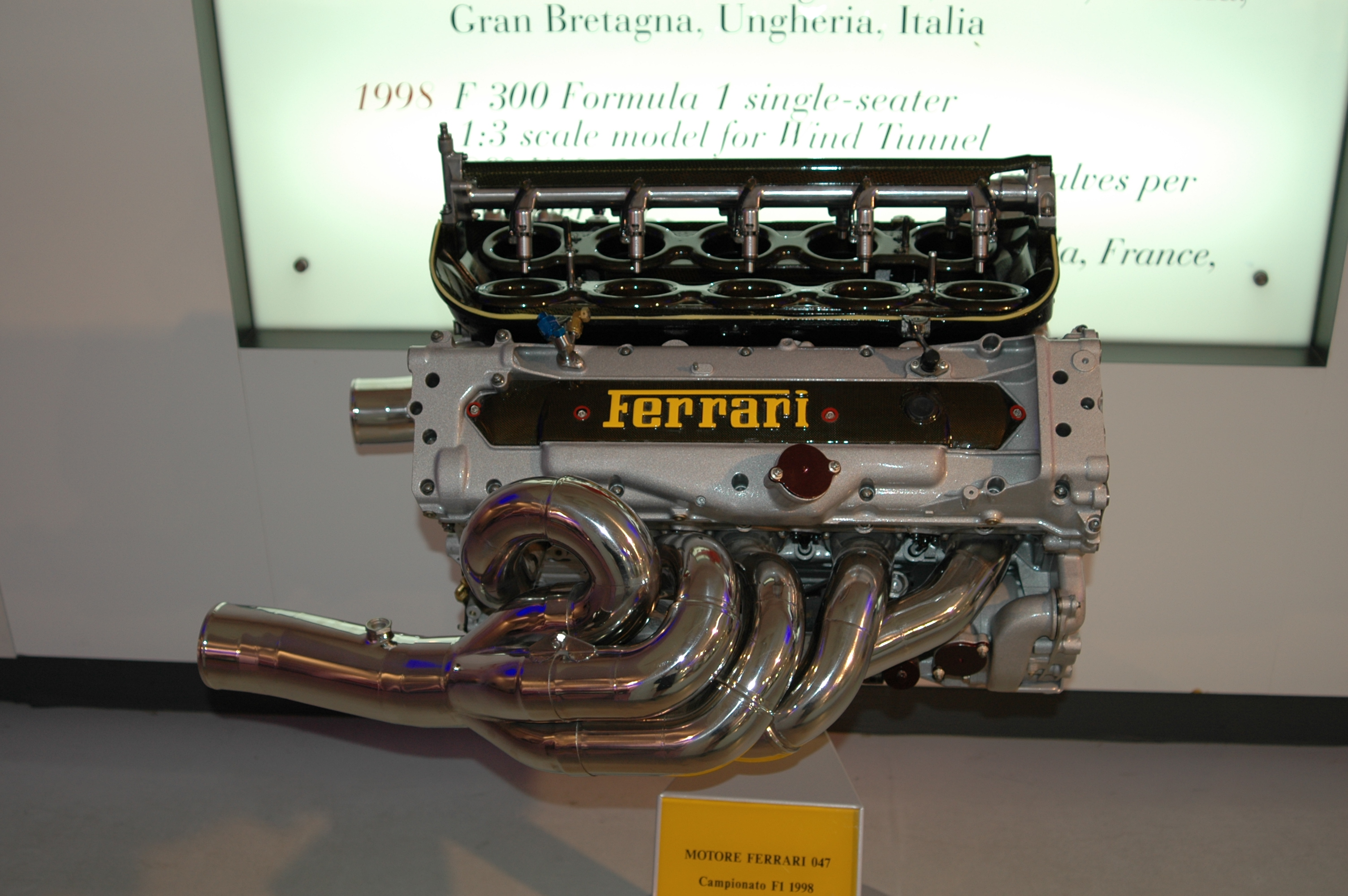
1998 Tipo 047 engine.

The 3-litre Ferrari Tipo 047 V10 engine and designed around a narrower track as mandated by the FIA in a series of regulation changes for that season. The engine itself is an 80-degree V10; which makes 805 hp (600 kW) at 17,300 rpm.

==== Specifications ====
Weight: 120 kg
Engine Configuration: 80° V10
Bore: 92mm
Stroke: 45.08mm
Valves: 4 per cylinder
Displacement: 2996.7 cc
No. of revolutions: Max. 17,300 rpm
Power: 592 kW (794 hp)
Power/liter: 269 hp/L

=== Tipo 048/B/C (1999) ===
The Tipo 048/B/C engine is an 80-degree, 3.0-litre V10 engine, manufactured by Ferrari. The engine itself was designed by Giles Simon; who lead the engine design and operations. It produces 790 BHP (552 KW) at 16,300 rpm, and won Ferrari their first World Constructors' championship in 20 years.

==== Specifications ====
Weight: 048/114 kg, 048B/107 kg, 048C/105 kg
Engine Configuration: 80° V10
Bore: 94mm
Stroke: 43.19mm
Valves: 4 per cylinder
Displacement: 2997.3 cc
Power: ~ 552 kW (740 hp) at 16,300 rpm
Power/liter: 263 hp/L

=== Tipo 049 (2000) ===
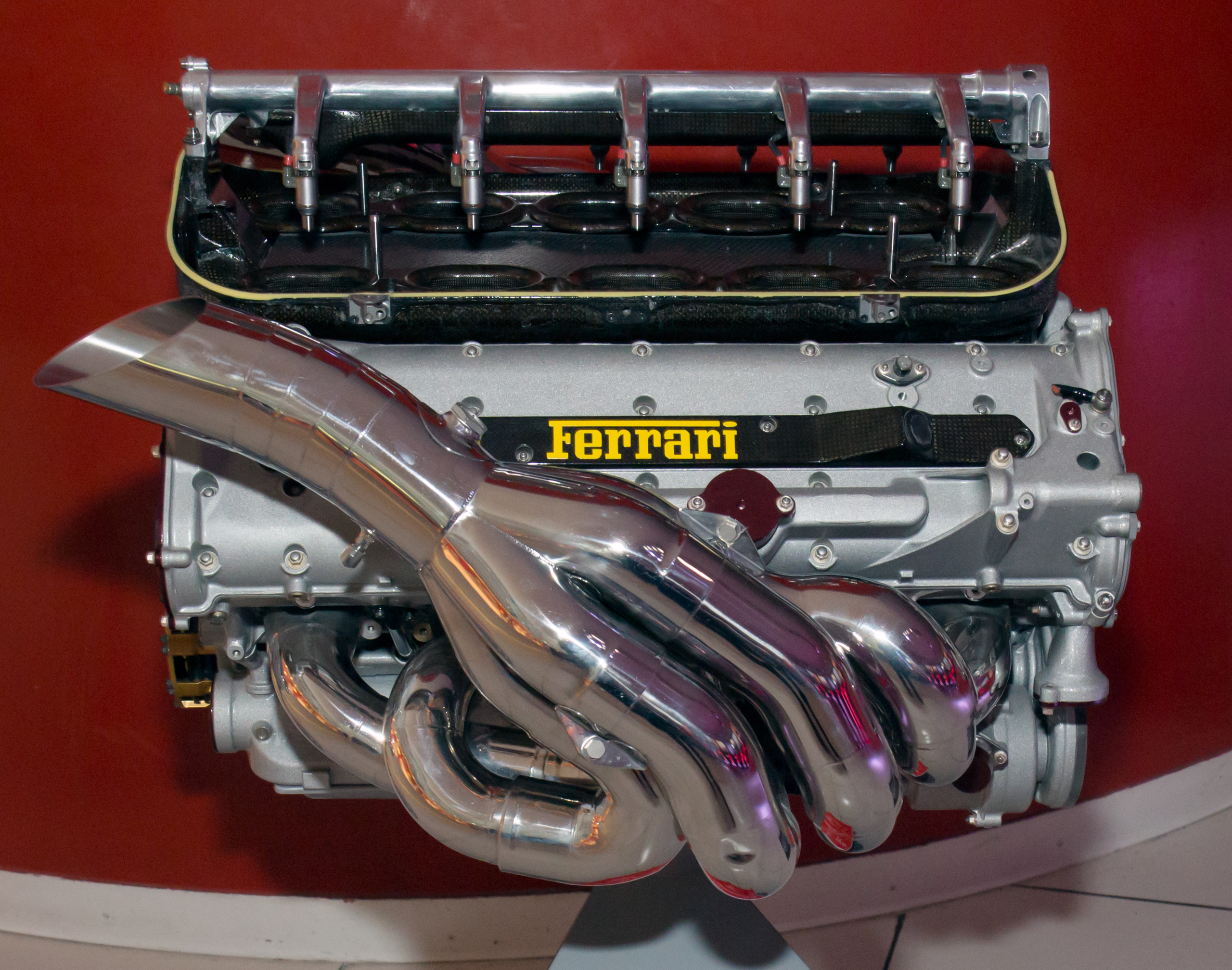
2000 Tipo 049 engine.

Giles Simon lead the engine design procedure and operations of the Tipo 049. The engine was newly designed, with a wider V-angle (90 degrees vs. 75 degrees in the 048 engine); this new wider angle improved and lowered the centre of gravity of the car that it powered. The engine produced between 805 and 815 hp at 17,300 rpm.

==== Specifications ====
Weight: 106 kg
Engine Configuration: 90° V10
Bore: 96mm
Stroke: 41.4mm
Valves: 4 per cylinder
Displacement: 2996.6 cc
No. of revolutions: Max. 17,300 rpm
Power: ~ 599 kW (803 hp)
Power/liter: 272 hp/L
Exhaust: Two outlet pipes
Installation position: Mid-engine, rear, longitudinal

== Second generation: Tipo 05x engine (2001–2005) ==
=== Tipo 050 engine (2001) ===
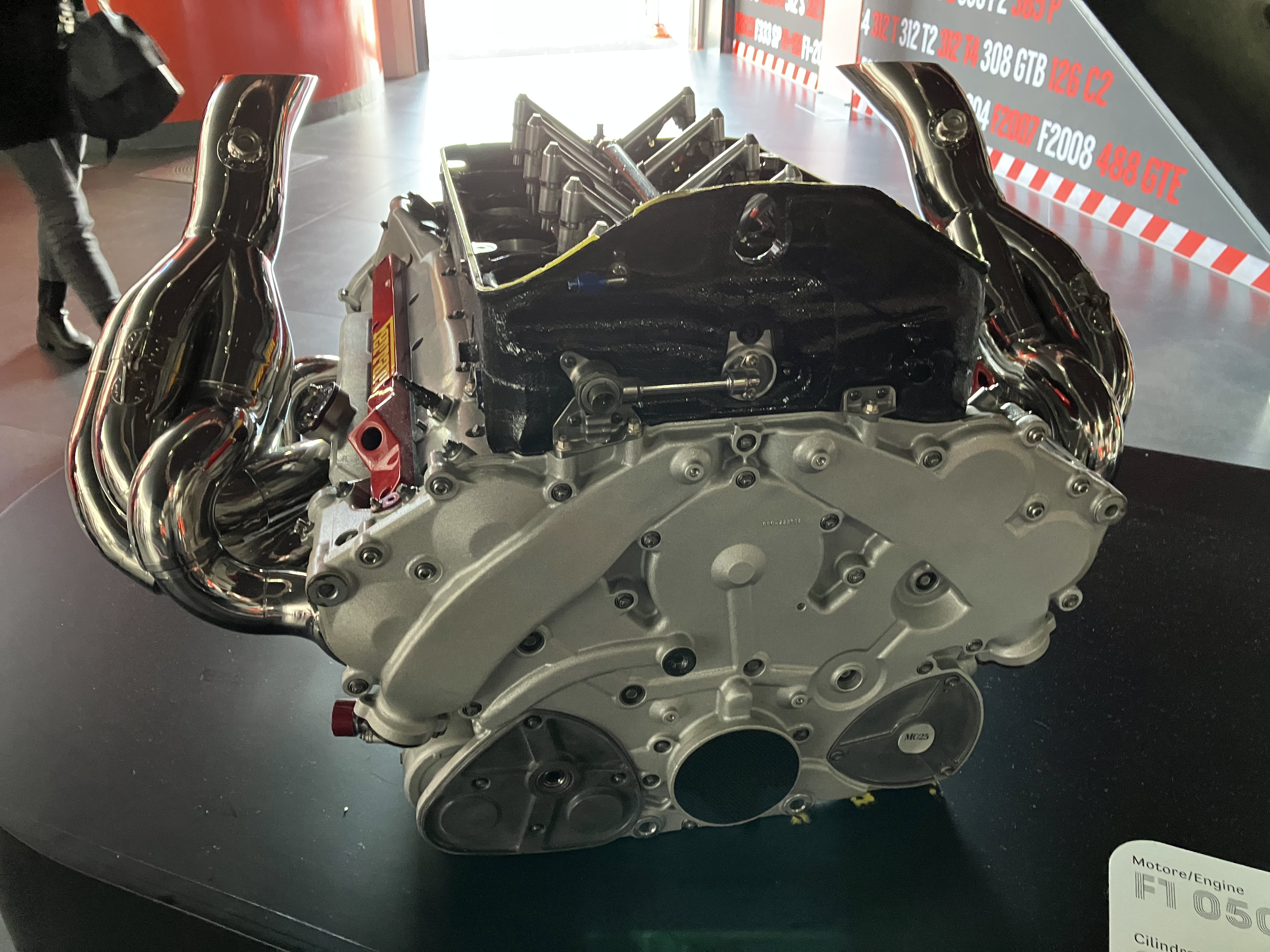
2001 Tipo 050 at the Museo Ferrari

The Ferrari Tipo 050 engine was designed by Gilles Simon. It is a 90-degree V10; which produces 825 horsepower (615 kW) at 17,300 rpm in race mode. However, the engine can be tuned to produce up to 900 horsepower in qualifying trim. The whole engine unit weighs 94 kg (207 lb.).

=== Tipo 051 engine (2002) ===
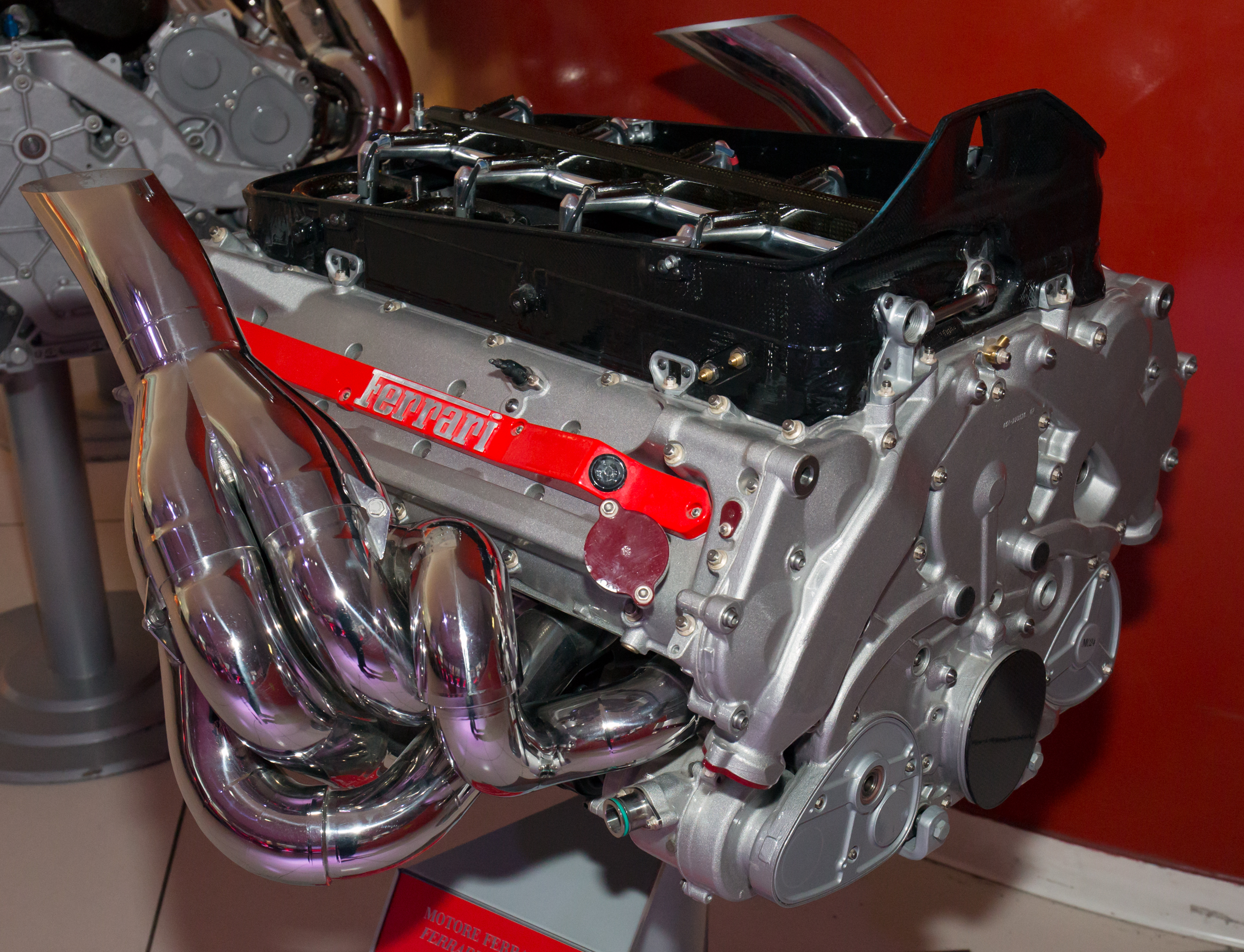
Tipo 051 engine.

The Ferrari Tipo 051 racing engine was used in the 2002 Formula 1 season. The V10 engine was developed under engine chief Paolo Martinelli.

The Type 051 was a new development but based on the architecture of its predecessor, the Tipo 050. All the main components have been revised. The engine block was made using a refined micro-casting technology. The cylinder heads were downsized and the crankcase modified so that the crankshaft was lowered, giving the vehicle an exceptionally low center of gravity. Associated components have been redesigned to reduce rotating masses and friction.

Ferrari also developed a new transmission for the new engine. The new case is significantly smaller, stiffer, and made from a lightweight titanium alloy, making it around 15% lighter than its predecessor. Along with the lighter internals and new clutchless direct shift technology, this resulted in smoother and faster shifting. Prototypes of this transmission were already on the test bench in September 2001. In this way, the team was able to ensure that, despite all the innovations, it was reliable right from the start.

The engine management came as before from Magneti Marelli, Shell supplied the fuel.

The Tipo 051 was used by Ferrari in the 2002 season on the F2002. Sauber used this engine (development status mid-September 2002) in the Sauber C22 in the 2003 season. However, Sauber used the name PETRONAS 03A for the engine.

Ferrari officially specified 835 hp at 17,800 rpm. In qualifying mode, however, the engine developed up to 900 hp at 19,000 rpm. In order to ensure durability, the performance in the race was reduced. There it delivered up to 865 hp at 18,600 rpm. With this power, the Type 051 was considered one of the most powerful engines in the field and was only surpassed by the P81 used by BMW Williams. This made up to 940 hp, but was less reliable than the Type 051.

In the course of the season, there were two further expansion stages, type 051B/C.

==== Specifications ====
Weight: 95 kg
Engine Configuration: 90° V10
Bore: 96mm
Stroke: 41.4mm
Valves: 4 per cylinder
Displacement: 2996.6 cc
No. of revolutions: Max. 17,800 rpm
Power: ~ 614 kW (823 hp)
Power/liter: 279 hp/L
Exhaust: Two outlet pipes
Installation position: Mid-engine, rear, longitudinal

Giles Simon and Paolo Martinelli led the engine's design and operations. The 3.0-litre Tipo 051 V10 engine produced 835 horsepower (623 kW) at 17,800 rpm in race trim. In qualifying mode, however, the engine developed up to 900 horsepower (670 kW) at 19,000 rpm. The engine had a very low centre of gravity, but to ensure durability and reliability, the engine performance was reduced during the race. Thus, the Tipo 051 was capable of producing 865 horsepower (645 kW), and revving to a maximum of 18,600 rpm, all while having excellent handling. The new 051 engine was not the strongest engine of 2002, only being beaten out by the BMW P81 engine used by the Williams team (which produced 940 horsepower (700 kW)); but it was lighter, more compact, very fuel-efficient, and very driveable. An innovative and very small clutchless gearbox allowing ultra-quick changes had been designed, and because the unit was so small, the rear end aerodynamics were extremely tightly packaged. Bridgestone developed special tyres, suited specifically for the car.

=== Tipo 052 engine (2003) ===
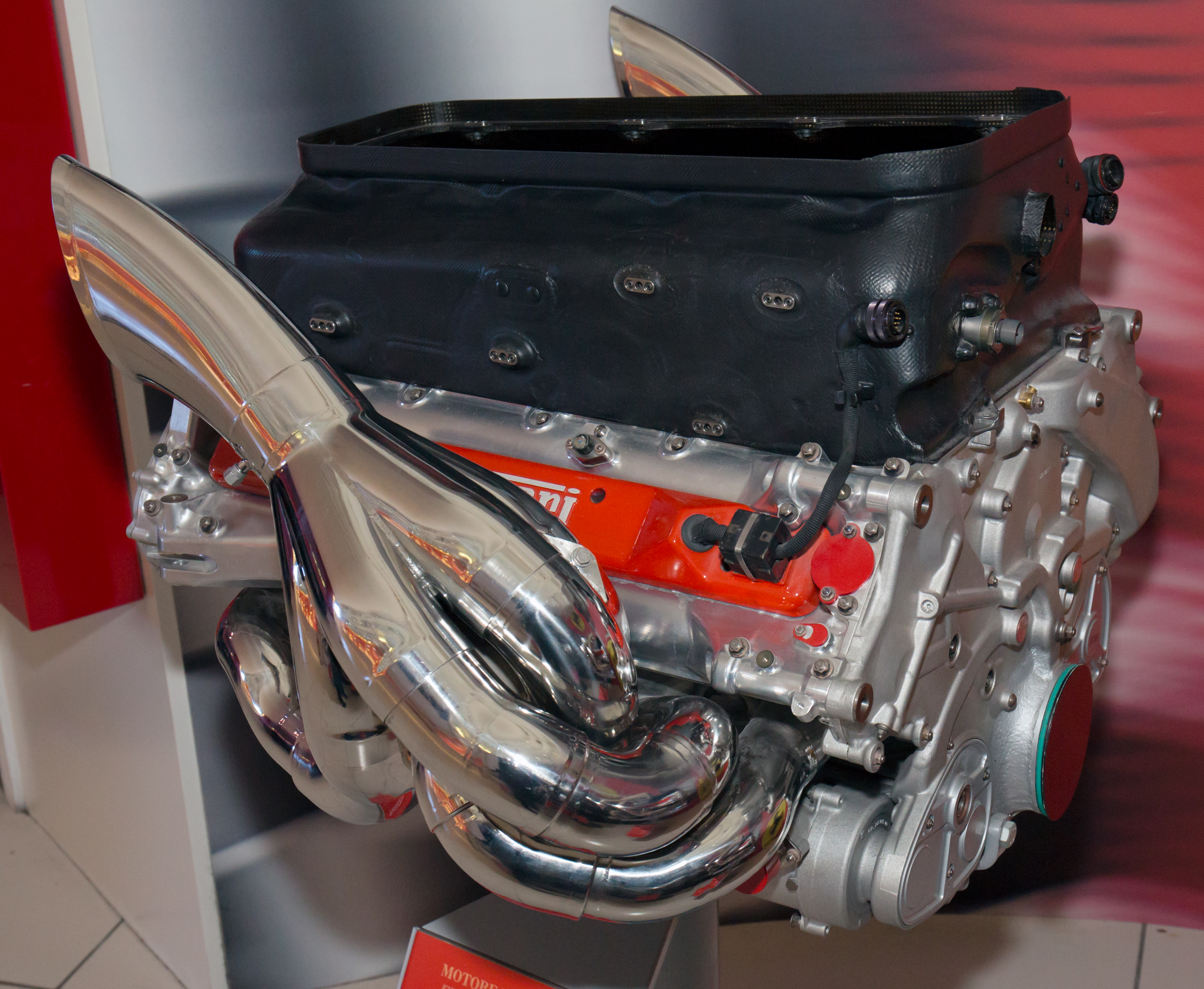
Tipo 052 engine.

The Ferrari Type 052 racing engine was used in the 2003 Formula 1 season. The V10 engine was developed under engine chief Paolo Martinelli.

The Tipo 052 was used by Ferrari in the 2003 season. Ferrari contested the first four races of the season with the previous year's car, the F2002. The Type 052 was not used until the fifth race with the debut of the F2003-GA. This was because the F2003-GA's chassis was designed around the engine.

The Tipo 052 was a completely new development. Ferrari essentially pursued two goals when developing the Tipo 052. On the one hand, the performance and drivability of the engine should be improved without impairing the reliability of the predecessor. On the other hand, the engine should be even better adapted to the design of the chassis in order to achieve better weight distribution. The team also hoped that the improved integration would result in weight savings of 4-5 percent and improved aerodynamics at the rear of the car. In addition to better integration, new materials also resulted in weight savings.

Engine management was by Magneti Marelli.

The specification used at the beginning of the season delivered around 200 revolutions per minute more than the predecessor Type 051.

During the season there were the usual expansion stages. Even though Ferrari officially stated an output of 845 hp at 18,300 rpm, experts suspected an output of 900 hp at up to 19,000 rpm.

Paolo Martinelli, assisted by Giles Simon, lead the engine design and operations. The Tipo 052 engine was a developed versions of the previous model. The 3.0 L V10 engine produced 845 horsepower (630 kW) at 18,300 rpm

Weight: 85 kg
Engine Configuration: 90° V10
Valves: 4 per cylinder
Displacement: 2996.6 cc
No. of revolutions: 18,300 rpm
Power/liter: 282 hp/L
Exhaust: Two outlet pipes
Power: 671 kW (900 hp)
Installation position: Mid-engine, rear, longitudinal

=== Tipo 053 engine (2004) ===
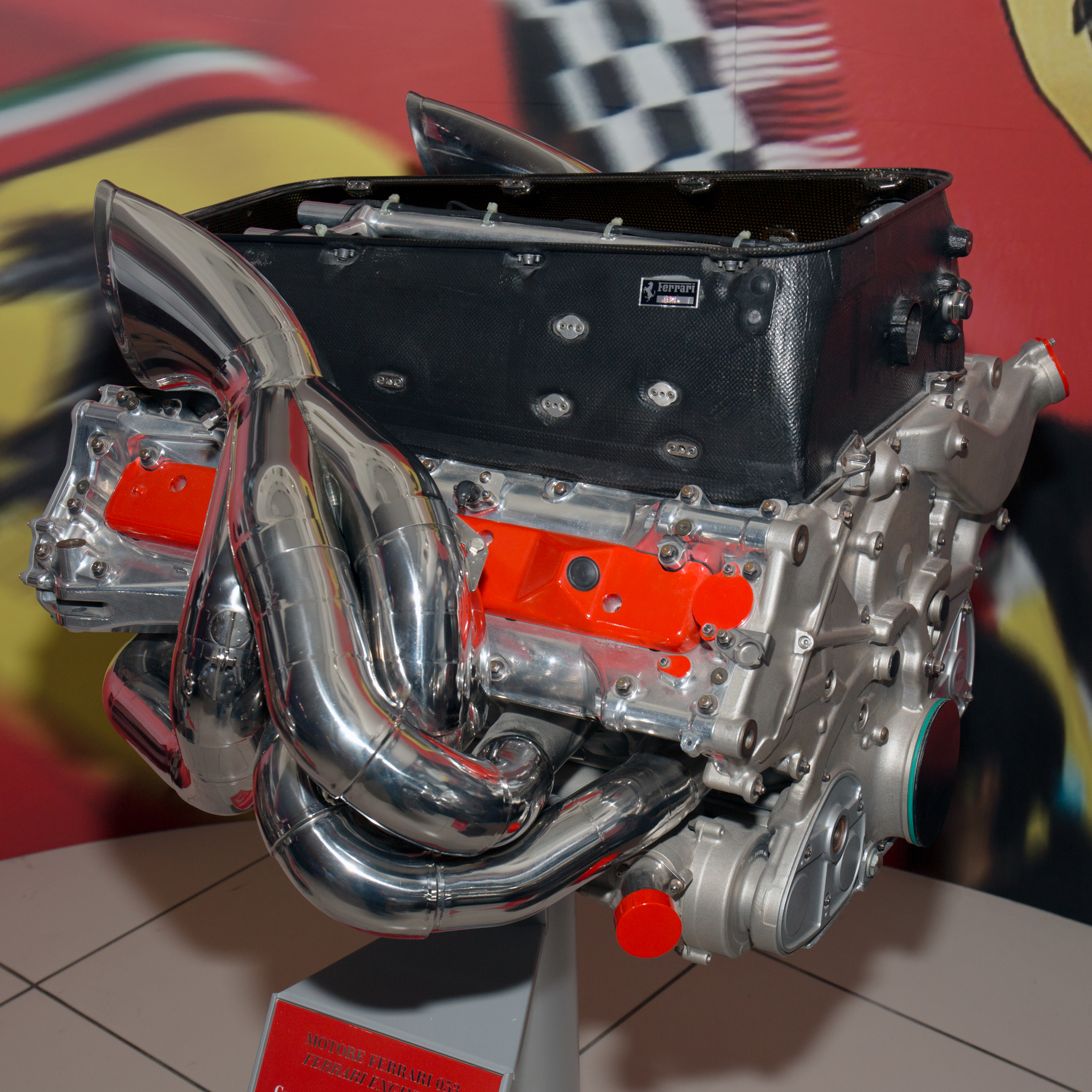
Tipo 053 engine.

The Ferrari Tipo 053 racing engine was used in the 2004 Formula 1 season. The V10 engine was developed under engine chief Paolo Martinelli.

Type 053 is a completely new development. The engine rules introduced for the 2004 season required that each engine last an entire race weekend. An illegal engine change would have resulted in a grid penalty of 10 places. That is why Ferrari focused on durability and reliability when developing the 053. To achieve this goal, all moving parts have been redesigned. The weight increased only slightly compared to the predecessor Type 052, which is partly due to the use of new alloys. The engine management came from Magneti Marelli.

For the fourth year running, Technical Director and Paolo Martinelli, assisted by Giles Simon, lead the engine design and operations. The engine powered the highly successful Ferrari F2004, that was driven by Michael Schumacher and Rubens Barrichello, and gave Schumacher his fifth and final World Championship with Ferrari at the Belgian Grand Prix, and his seventh Formula One World Championship overall. The engine was now designed in accordance with the FIA's new technical regulations for the season, and had to last a full race weekend. The engine now produced 865 horsepower (645 kW) at 18,300 rpm in race trim, and around 920 horsepower (690 kW) at 19,000 rpm in qualifying mode. The engine also now weighed only 92 kg (203 lbs.).

The Type 053 was only used in the 2004 season and only by Ferrari on the F2004 and Sauber on the Sauber C23. However, Sauber used the name PETRONAS 04A for the engine.

For the San Marino Grand Prix, there was the first stage of development that delivered 920 hp.

==== Specifications ====
Weight: 95 kg
Length: 597mm
Width: 530mm
Height: 353mm
Engine Configuration: 90° V10
Valves: 4 per cylinder
Offset angle: 144°
Bore: 98mm
Stroke: 39.75mm
Displacement: 2998.3 cc
No. of revolutions: Max. 19,000 rpm
Power/liter: 307 hp/L
Exhaust: Two outlet pipes
Power: 686 kW (920 hp)
Installation position: Mid-engine, rear, longitudinal

=== Tipo 055 engine (2005) ===
The Ferrari Type 055 racing engine was used in the 2005 Formula 1 season. The V10 engine was developed under engine chief Paolo Martinelli.

The Tipo 055 is a further development of the predecessor Type 053. The engine rules introduced for the 2004 season were tightened again for the 2005 season. From now on, an engine had to last two entire race weekends. An illegal engine change would have resulted in a grid penalty of 10 places. Therefore, as in the previous year, Ferrari's focus in the development of the 055 was on durability and reliability. To achieve this goal, many parts were newly developed, some could be taken over from the predecessor. Although the engine was stable, the weight increased only marginally.

The engine management came as before from Magneti Marelli. Shell supplied new fuel and lubricants that should have a positive impact on reliability.

Throughout the season there were the usual stages of expansion.

The Tipo 055 was Ferrari's last 10-cylinder engine. From the 2006 season, Formula 1 relied on V8 engines with a displacement of 2.4 liters.

For the fifth and final year running, Technical Director Paolo Martinelli, assisted by Giles Simon, led the engine design and operations. The car was driven by Michael Schumacher and Rubens Barrichello. This was also Ferrari's last V10 engine. The 90°, naturally-aspirated, 3.0 L (183 cu in) Tipo 055 engine made 865 hp at 18,300 rpm, in race trim, and over 940 hp at 19,000 rpm in qualifying mode. The engine only weighed around 90 kg (198 lb).

The Tipo 055 was only used in the 2005 season and only by Ferrari on the F2005 and Sauber on the Sauber C24. However, Sauber used the name PETRONAS 05A for the engine.

==== Specifications ====
Weight: 90 kg
Engine Configuration: 90° V10
Valves: 4 per cylinder
Displacement: 2998.3 cc
No. of revolutions: Max. 19,000 rpm
Exhaust: Two outlet pipes
Power Output: 701 kW (940 hp)
Installation position: Mid-engine, rear, longitudinal

== Formula One engine specifications ==
=== Naturally-aspirated V10 engines ===
Engine name	Bank angle (°)	Configuration	Displacement (L)	Bore × stroke	Power Output	Year	Aspiration
Tipo 046	75	V10	3.0	90 mm × 47.1 mm (3.54 in × 1.85 in)	715-725 hp at 15,550 rpm	1996	N/A
Tipo 046/2	75	V10	3.0	90 mm × 47.1 mm (3.54 in × 1.85 in)	730–760 hp at 16,050 rpm	1997	N/A
Tipo 047/B/C	80	V10	3.0	92 mm × 52.08 mm (3.622 in × 2.050 in)	790–805 hp at 16,300 rpm	1998	N/A
Tipo 048/B/C	80	V10	3.0	94 mm × 43.19 mm (3.701 in × 1.700 in)	805 hp at 17,300 rpm	1999	N/A
Tipo 049	90	V10	3.0	96 mm × 41.4 mm (3.78 in × 1.63 in)	805-815 hp at 17,300 rpm	2000	N/A
Tipo 050	90	V10	3.0	96 mm × 41.4 mm (3.78 in × 1.63 in)	825-840 hp at 17,300 rpm	2001	N/A
Tipo 051	90	V10	3.0	96 mm × 41.4 mm (3.78 in × 1.63 in)	835 hp at 17,800 rpm (race); 900 hp at 19,000 rpm (qualifying)	2002	N/A
Tipo 052	90	V10	3.0	96 mm × 41.4 mm (3.78 in × 1.63 in)	845-860 hp at 18,300 rpm (race); 920 hp at 19,000 rpm (qualifying)	2003	N/A
Tipo 053	90	V10	3.0	98 mm × 39.75 mm (3.858 in × 1.565 in)	865 hp at 18,300 rpm (race); 940 hp at 19,000 rpm (qualifying)	2004	N/A
Tipo 054/055	90	V10	3.0	98 mm × 39.75 mm (3.858 in × 1.565 in)	865 hp at 18,300 rpm (race) >940 hp at 19,000 rpm (qualifying)	2005	N/A

== Applications ==
- Ferrari F310 and Ferrari F310B: Tipo 046 and Tipo 046/2
- Ferrari F300: Tipo 047/B/C
- Ferrari F399: Tipo 048/B/C
- Ferrari F1-2000: Tipo 049
- Ferrari F2001: Tipo 050
- Ferrari F2002: Tipo 051/B/C
- Ferrari F2003-GA: Tipo 052
- Ferrari F2004: Tipo 053
- Ferrari F2005: Tipo 054 and Tipo 055

== Formula One World Championship results ==
- 6 World Constructors' Championships.
- 5 World Drivers' Championships.
- 77 race wins.
- 62 pole positions.
- 185 podium finishes (including Sauber Grand Prix results).

== See also ==
- Renault RS engine
- Yamaha F1 engine
- Peugeot F1 engine
- Mercedes-Benz FO engine
- Cosworth JD / VJ engine
- Petronas F1 engine
- Cosworth CR engine
- BMW E41 / P80 engine
- Honda V10 engine
- Asiatech F1 engine
- Toyota RVX engine
