= Ferrari F2003-GA =

2003 Formula One racing car by Ferrari

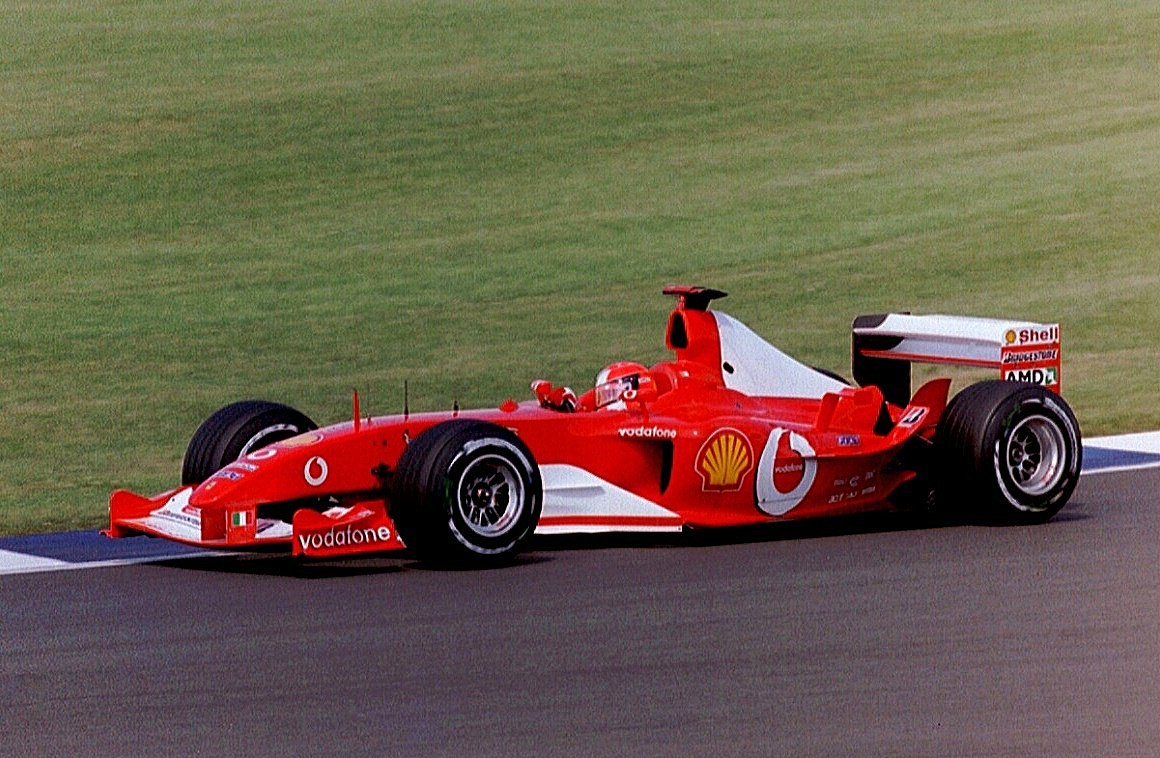
- Michael Schumacher driving the F2003-GA at the 2003 British Grand Prix
- Category: Formula One
- Constructor: Scuderia Ferrari
- Designers: Ross Brawn (Technical Director); Rory Byrne (Chief Designer); Ignazio Lunetta (Head of R&D); Aldo Costa (Head of Chassis Design); Marco Fainello (Head of Vehicle Dynamics); Roberto Dalla (Head of Electronics); Nikolas Tombazis (Head of Aerodynamics); James Allison (Chief Aerodynamicist); Paolo Martinelli (Engine Technical Director); Gilles Simon (Engine Chief Designer)
- Predecessor: F2002B
- Successor: F2004

Technical specifications
- Chassis: Moulded carbon fibre & Honeycomb composite structure
- Suspension (front): Independent suspension, pushrod activated torsion springs
- Suspension (rear): Independent suspension, pushrod activated torsion springs
- Length: 4,545 mm (179 in)
- Width: 1,796 mm (71 in)
- Height: 959 mm (38 in)
- Engine: Ferrari Tipo 052 , 3.0 L (3,000 cc; 183 cu in) , V10 (90°) , Naturally Aspirated , in a mid-mounted, rear-wheel-drive layout
- Transmission: Ferrari 7-speed Semi-automatic Sequential Limited-slip Differential Gearbox + reverse
- Power: 845 horsepower (630 kW) @ 18,300 rpm (race trim); 920–930 horsepower (690–690 kW) @ 18,600-19,000 rpm
- Weight: 600 kg (1,323 lb)
- Fuel: Shell Fuel
- Lubricants: Shell Lubricant
- Brakes: Carbon brake discs, pads and calipers
- Tyres: Bridgestone BBS Racing Wheels : 13"

Competition history
- Notable entrants: Scuderia Ferrari Marlboro
- Notable drivers: 1. (Germany) Michael Schumacher; 2. (Brazil) Rubens Barrichello
- Debut: 2003 Spanish Grand Prix
- First win: 2003 Spanish Grand Prix
- Last win: 2003 Japanese Grand Prix
- Last event: 2003 Japanese Grand Prix
Races	Wins	Podiums	Poles	F/Laps
12	7	13	5	5
- Constructors' Championships: 1 (2003)
- Drivers' Championships: 1 (2003, Michael Schumacher)

The Ferrari F2003-GA was a highly successful car used by Scuderia Ferrari in the 2003 Formula One World Championship. The chassis was designed by Rory Byrne, Ignazio Lunetta, Aldo Costa, Marco Fainello, Nikolas Tombazis and James Allison with Ross Brawn playing a vital role in leading the production of the car as the team's Technical Director and Paolo Martinelli assisted by Giles Simon (engine design and development) and Pino D'Agostino (engine operations). Its development was based on the previous Ferrari F2002, but featured new bulbous sidepods and a lengthened wheelbase to aid aerodynamics. The engine and gearbox were developed versions of the previous model.

The car was designated "GA" as a mark of respect to Gianni Agnelli, the recently deceased head of Fiat.

== Overview ==
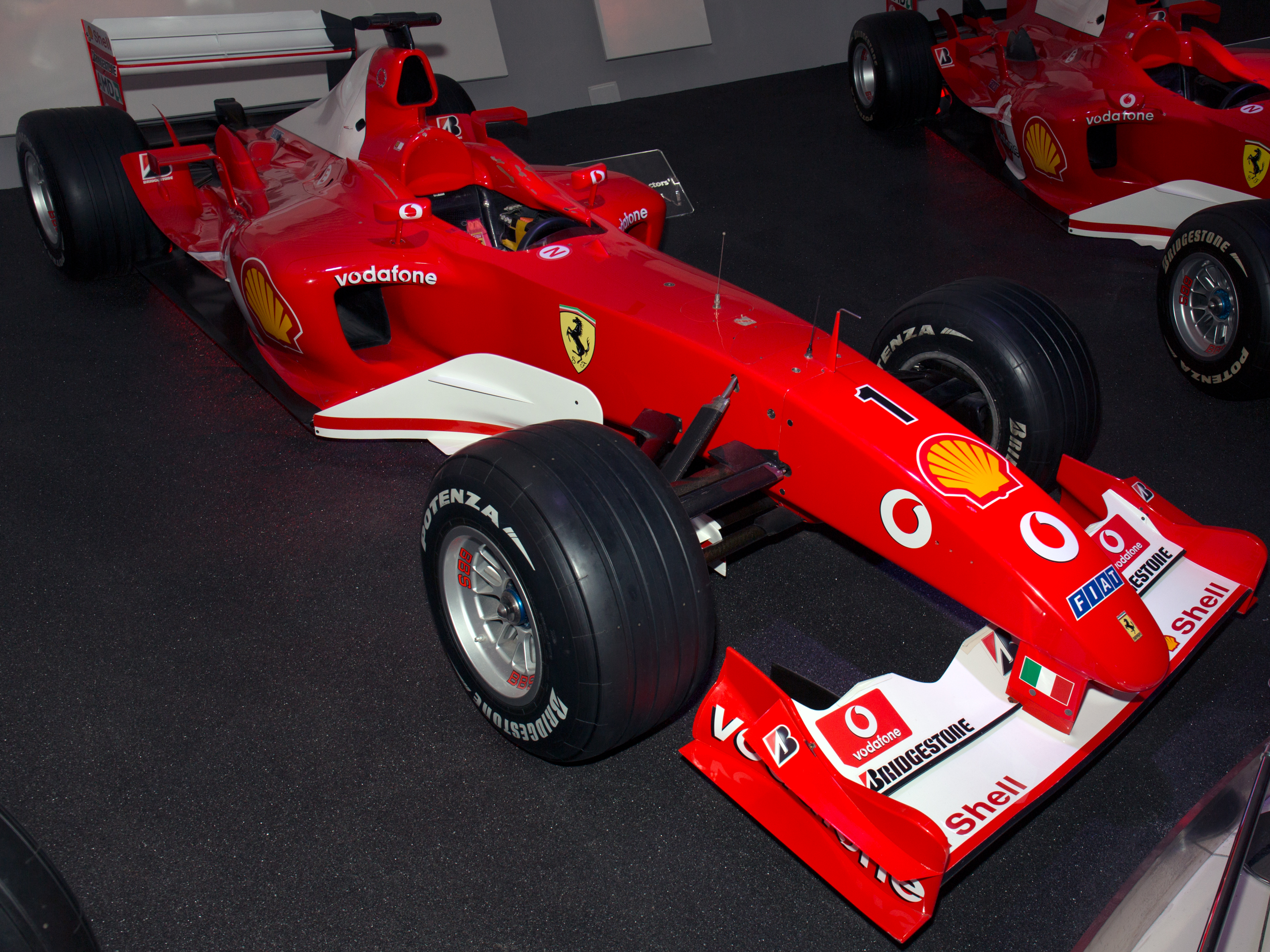
A Ferrari F2003-GA at Museo Ferrari

The car was introduced just before mid season in 2003, as the F2002 was seen as good enough to be competitive whilst the F2003-GA was developed further. The car was fast and competitive as it won 3 out its first 4 races, but had a tendency to overuse its tyres, which led to several late race tyre problems in mid seasons, causing a slight drop in form during the unusually hot European summer. As a result, Williams and McLaren were able to mount a consistent challenge to Ferrari and push Michael Schumacher for the championship.

After Bridgestone engineers discovered Michelin were using tyres which changed construction, causing the French tyre maker to provide remoulded tyres late in the season. Ferrari became competitive again as it won the final 3 races of the season, and were able to hold off both Williams and McLaren for the Constructors' Championship, whilst Schumacher snatched his sixth Drivers' title, breaking Juan Manuel Fangio's record which had stood for 46 years.

The car won seven races, five pole positions, and five fastest laps before being replaced with the dominant F2004 in 2004, a car which was almost identical to its predecessor.

== Sponsorship and livery ==
Ferrari used 'Marlboro' logos, except at the French, British and United States Grands Prix.

Vodafone continued to sponsor the team for second year with a new sponsorship from Olympus.

== Later use ==
On 11 December 2003, after the season had finished, Michael Schumacher raced the car against a Eurofighter Typhoon of the Italian Air Force over several measured distances to determine which was faster, the aircraft or the car. Schumacher won the first run, over the distance of 600 metres, thanks to the weight advantage of his car over the jet, but the Typhoon won the two remaining runs over the longer distances of 900 and 1200 metres, winning the overall race.

== Gallery ==
F2003-GA at the Museo Casa Enzo Ferrari

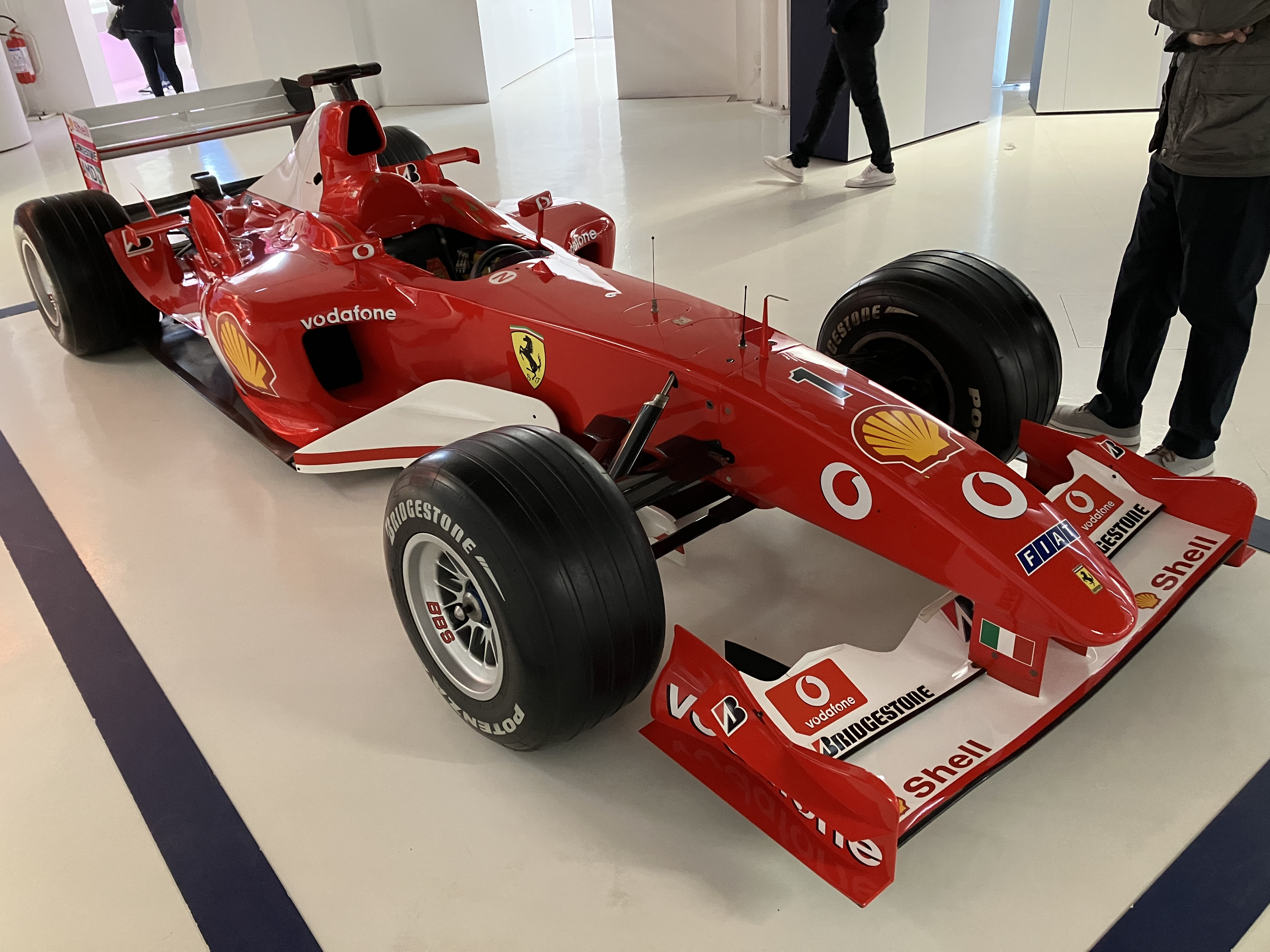

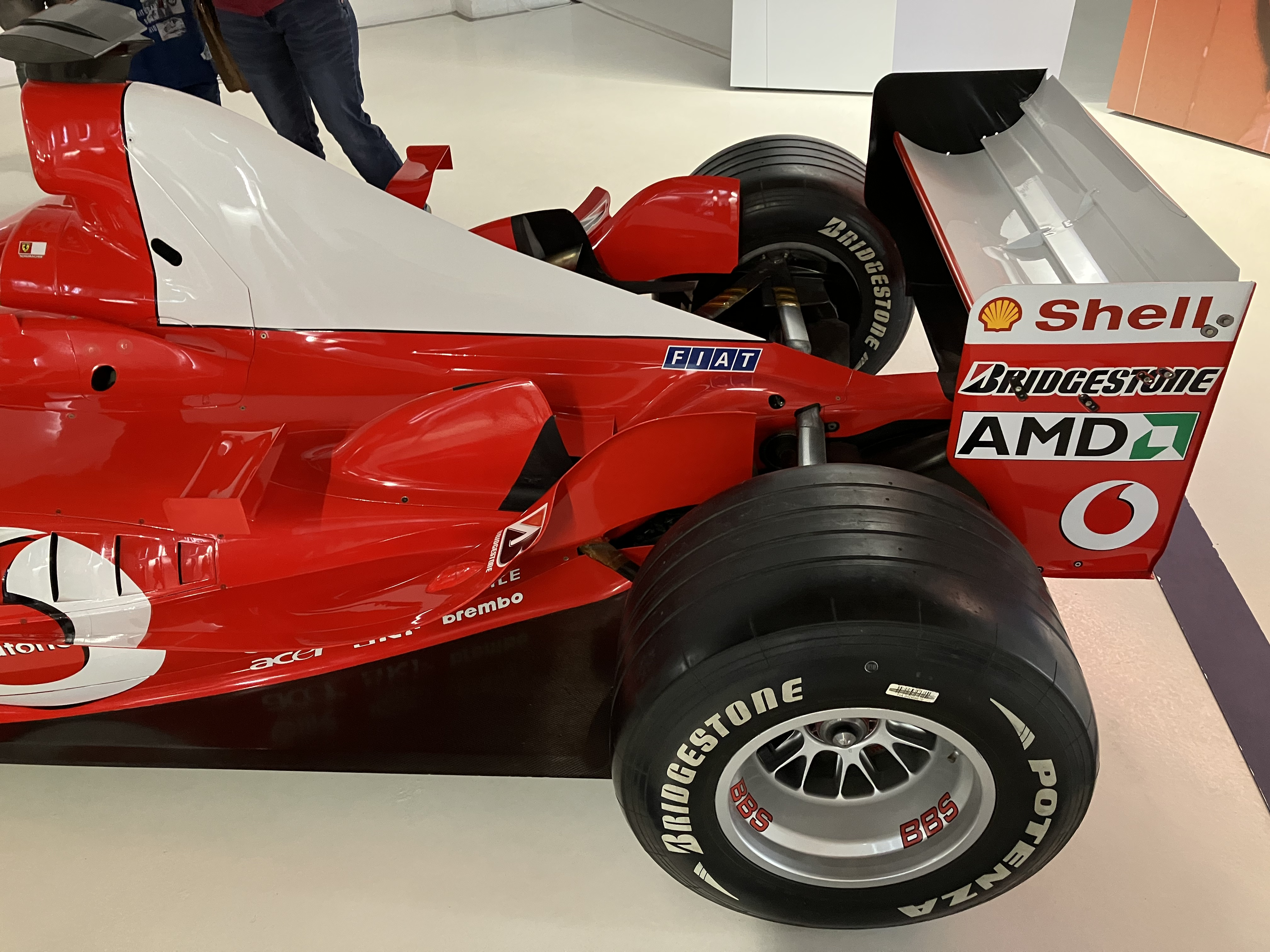

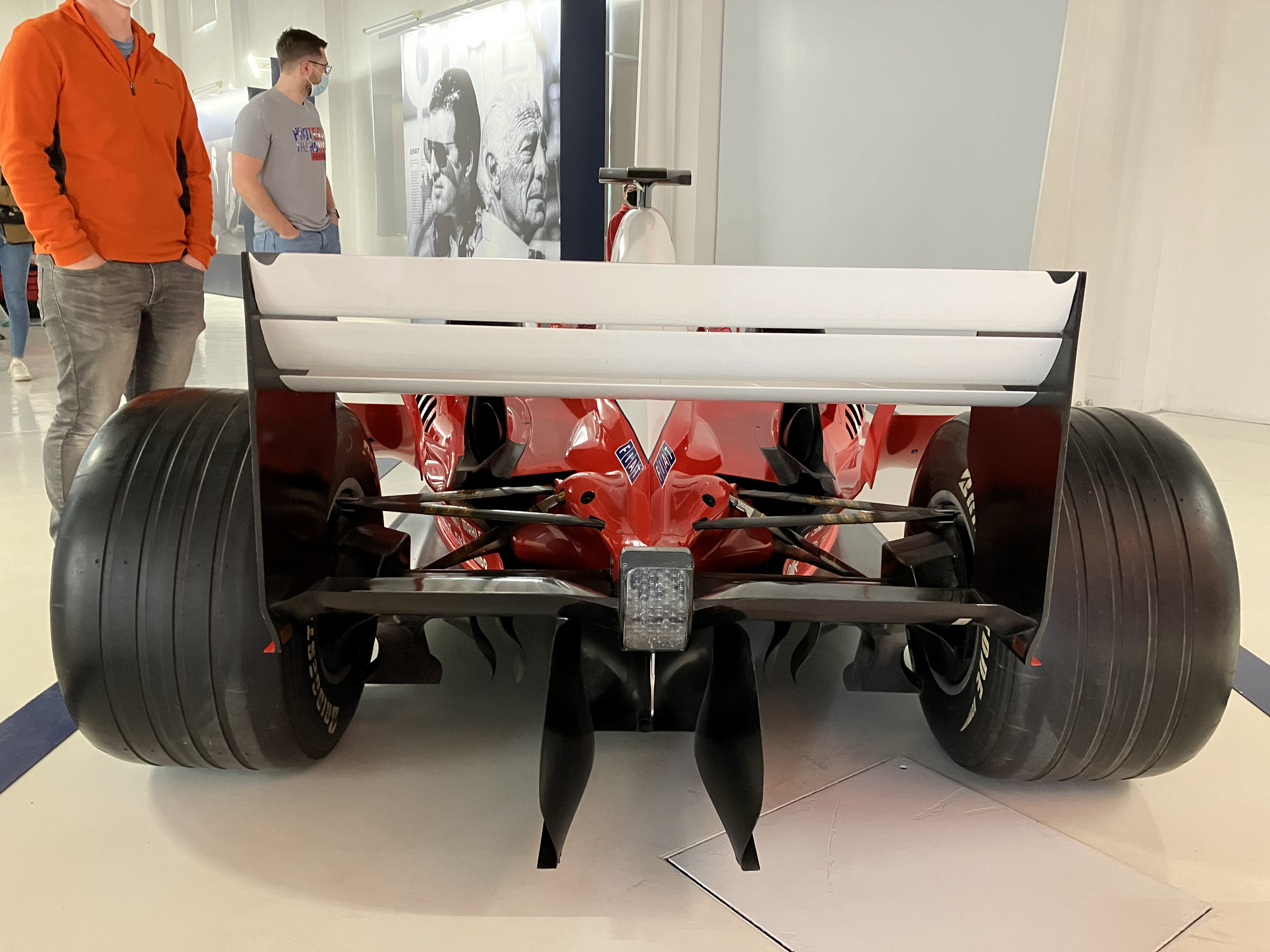

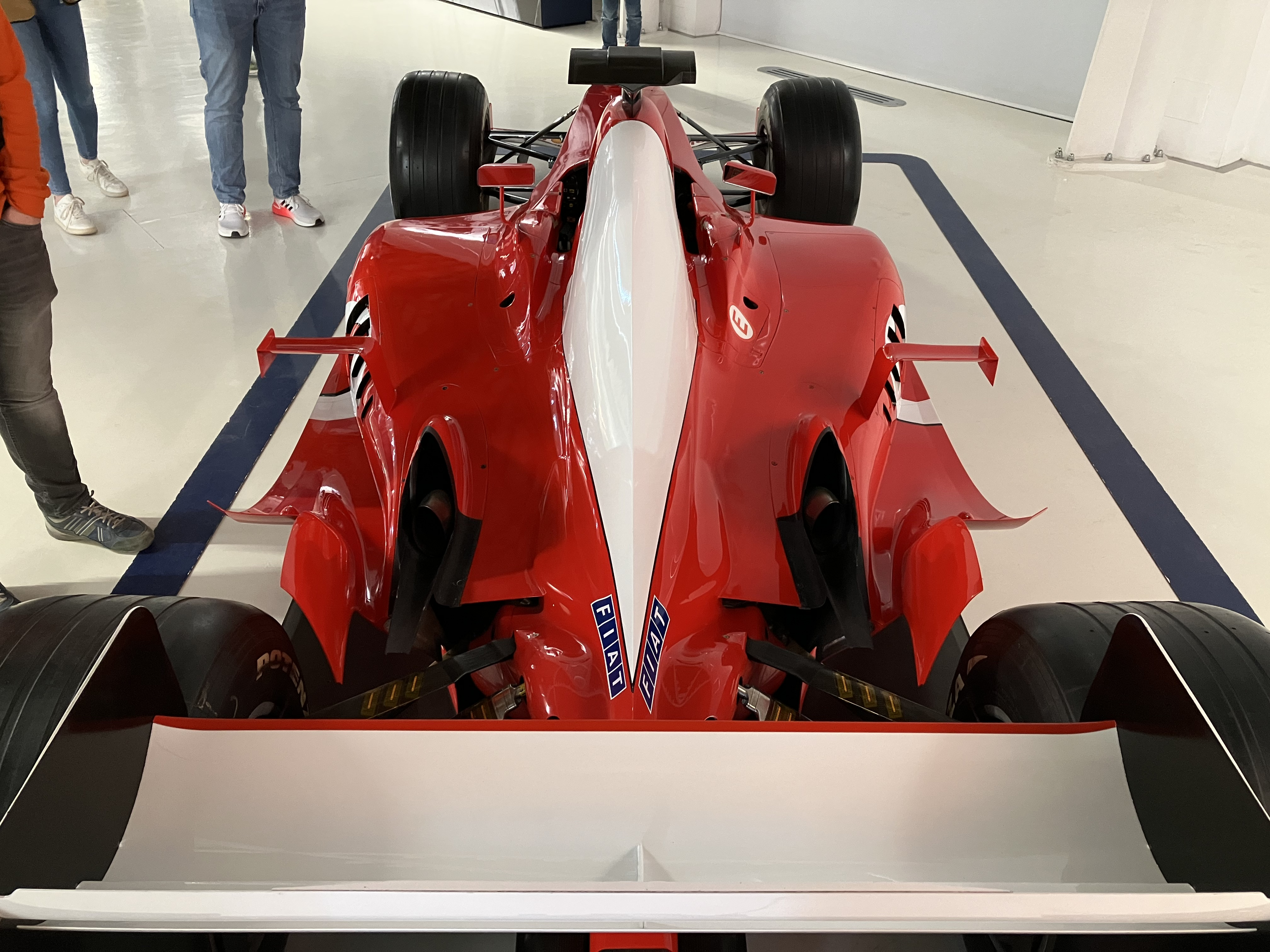

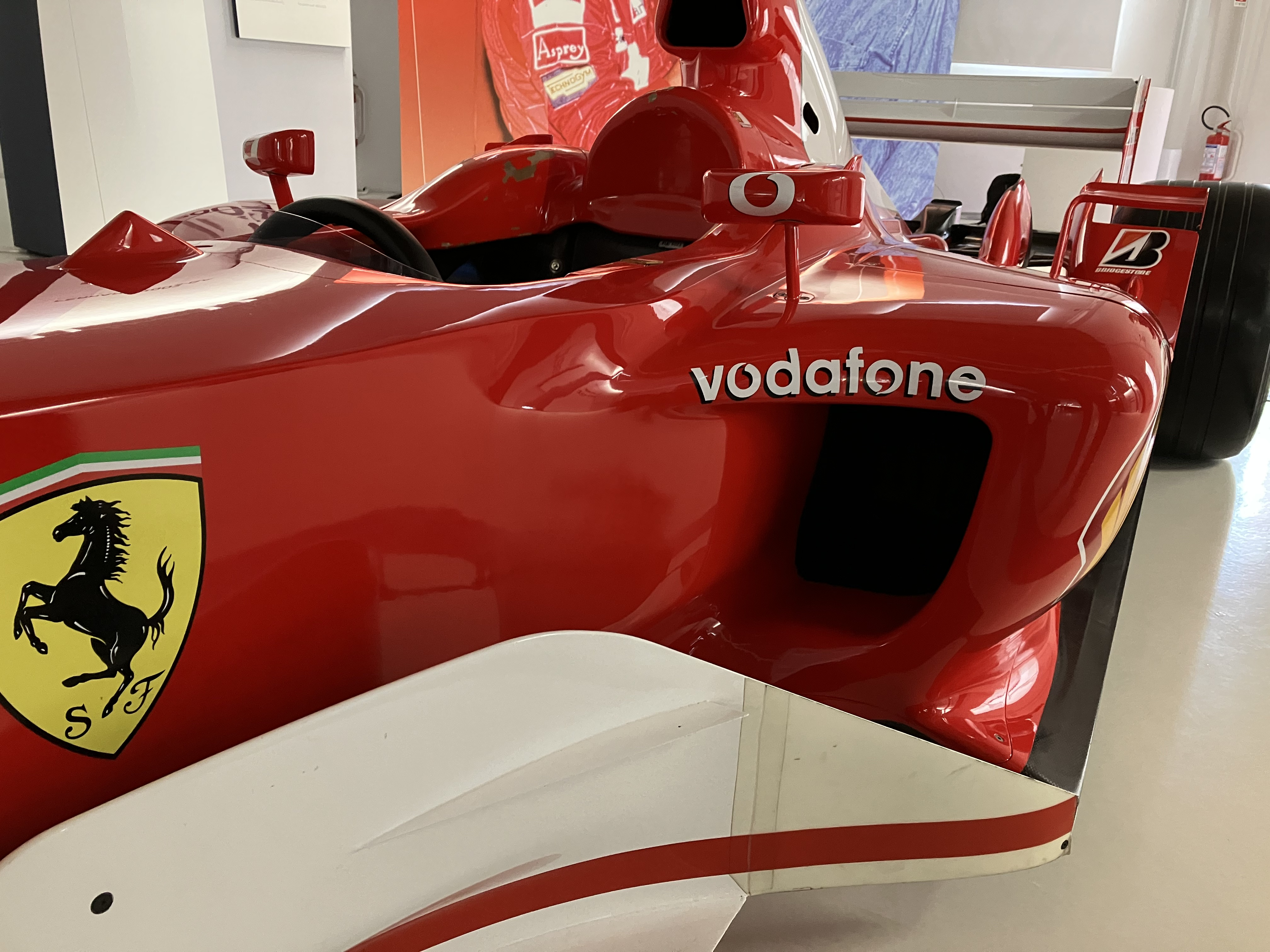

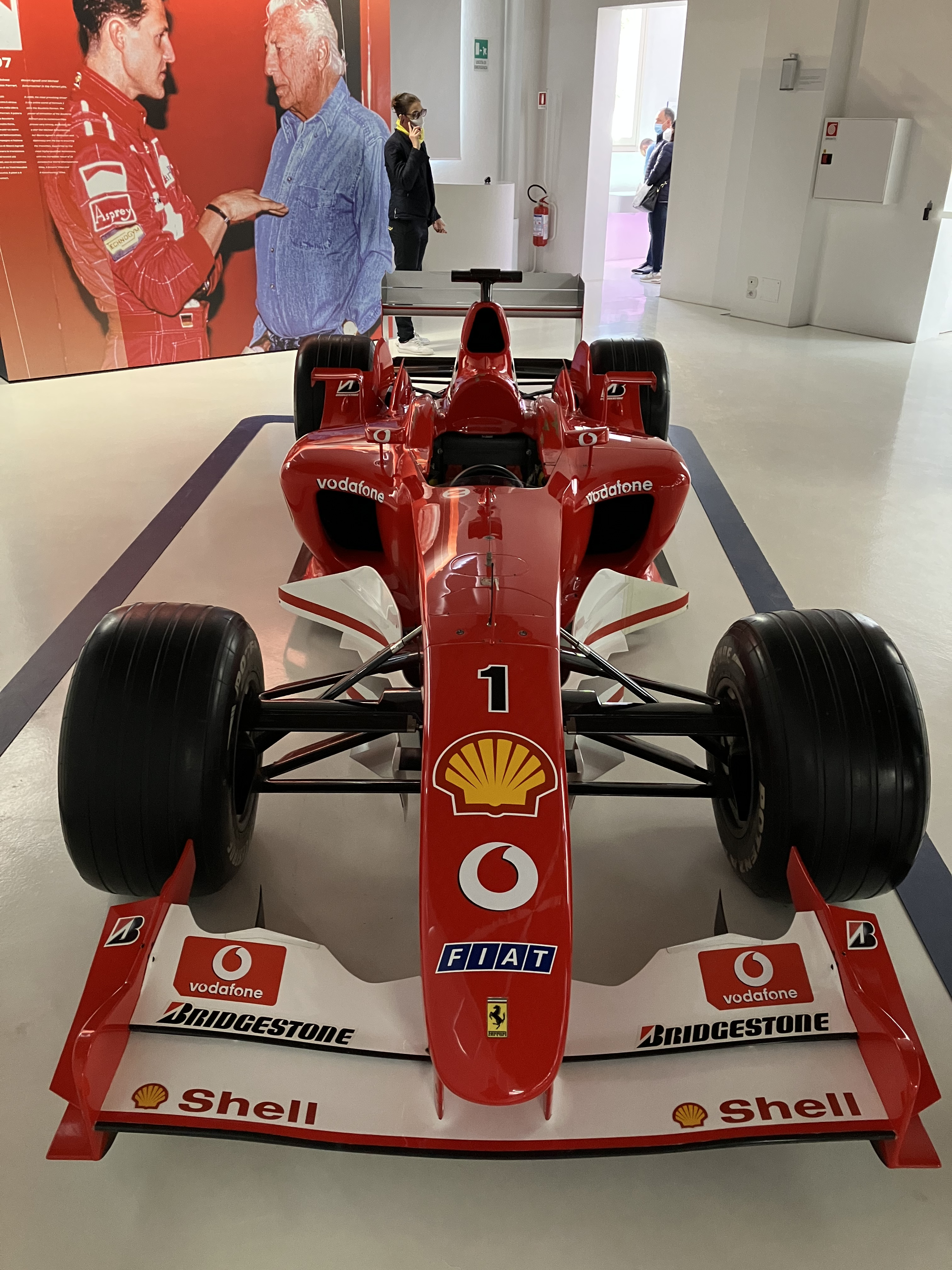

== Legacy ==
In November 2022, chassis number 229, which Schumacher used to win 5 Grands Prix during the 2003 season, was sold at auction by RM Sotheby's during Sotheby’s Luxury Week in Geneva, Switzerland. The car, complete with engine and in full running condition, sold for a world record price of CHF14,630,000 (US$14,873,327).

== Complete Formula One results ==
(key) (results in bold indicate pole position, results in italics indicate fastest lap)

Year	Entrant	Engine	Tyres	Drivers	1	2	3	4	5	6	7	8	9	10	11	12	13	14	15	16	Points	WCC
2003	Scuderia Ferrari Marlboro	052 3.0 V10	**B**		AUS	MAL	BRA	SMR	ESP	AUT	MON	CAN	EUR	FRA	GBR	GER	HUN	ITA	USA	JPN	**158***	**1st**
2003	Scuderia Ferrari Marlboro	052 3.0 V10	**B**	(Germany) Michael Schumacher					**1**	**1**	3	1	5	3	4	7	8	**1**	1	8	**158***	**1st**
2003	Scuderia Ferrari Marlboro	052 3.0 V10	**B**	(Brazil) Rubens Barrichello					3	3	8	5	3	7	**1**	Ret	Ret	3	Ret	**1**	**158***	**1st**

* 32 points scored with the F2002B
