= Ferrari F399 =

1999 Formula One racing car by Ferrari

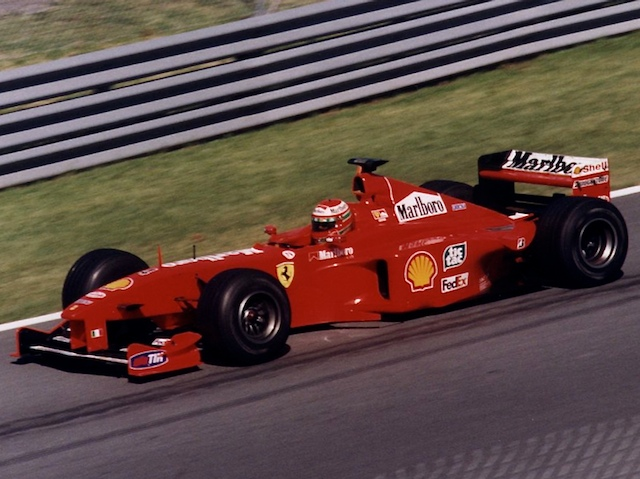
- Eddie Irvine driving the Ferrari F399 at the 1999 Canadian Grand Prix
- Category: Formula One
- Constructor: Ferrari
- Designers: Ross Brawn (Technical Director); Rory Byrne (Chief Designer); Giorgio Ascanelli (Head of R&D); Aldo Costa (Head of Chassis Design); Marco Fainello (Head of Vehicle Dynamics); Willem Toet (Head of Aerodynamics); Nikolas Tombazis (Chief Aerodynamicist); Paolo Martinelli (Engine Technical Director); Gilles Simon (Engine Chief Designer)
- Predecessor: F300
- Successor: F1-2000

Technical specifications
- Chassis: Carbon-fibre and honeycomb composite structure
- Suspension (front): Double-wishbone pushrod suspension
- Suspension (rear): Double-wishbone pushrod suspension
- Engine: Ferrari Tipo 048/B/C 80-degree V10
- Transmission: Ferrari seven-speed longitudinal sequential semi-automatic
- Power: 790 hp @ 16,300 rpm
- Fuel: Shell
- Tyres: Bridgestone

Competition history
- Notable entrants: Scuderia Ferrari Marlboro
- Notable drivers: 3. (Germany) Michael Schumacher; 3. (Finland) Mika Salo; 4. (United Kingdom) Eddie Irvine
- Debut: 1999 Australian Grand Prix
- First win: 1999 Australian Grand Prix
- Last win: 1999 Malaysian Grand Prix
- Last event: 1999 Japanese Grand Prix
Races	Wins	Podiums	Poles	F/Laps
16	6	17	3	6
- Constructors' Championships: 1 (1999)
- Drivers' Championships: 0

The Ferrari F399 was the car with which the Ferrari team competed in the 1999 Formula One World Championship. The chassis was designed by Rory Byrne, Giorgio Ascanelli, Aldo Costa, Marco Fainello, Willem Toet, and Nikolas Tombazis, with Ross Brawn playing a vital role in leading the production of the car as the team's technical director and Paolo Martinelli assisted by Giles Simon (engine design and development) and Pino D'Agostino (engine operations).

The F399 was almost identical to the previous season's F300, with small detail changes like a new front wing, wheel tethers, waisted sidepods, and an improved exhaust system and the use of Bridgestone tyres with four grooves instead of three. It was initially driven by Michael Schumacher and Eddie Irvine, with Mika Salo substituting for Schumacher when he broke his leg at Silverstone.

Although the team's quest to win their first drivers' title since 1979 was halted by Schumacher's injury and the faster speed of the McLaren MP4/14, they managed to clinch their first constructors' title since 1983.

== Technical specifications ==
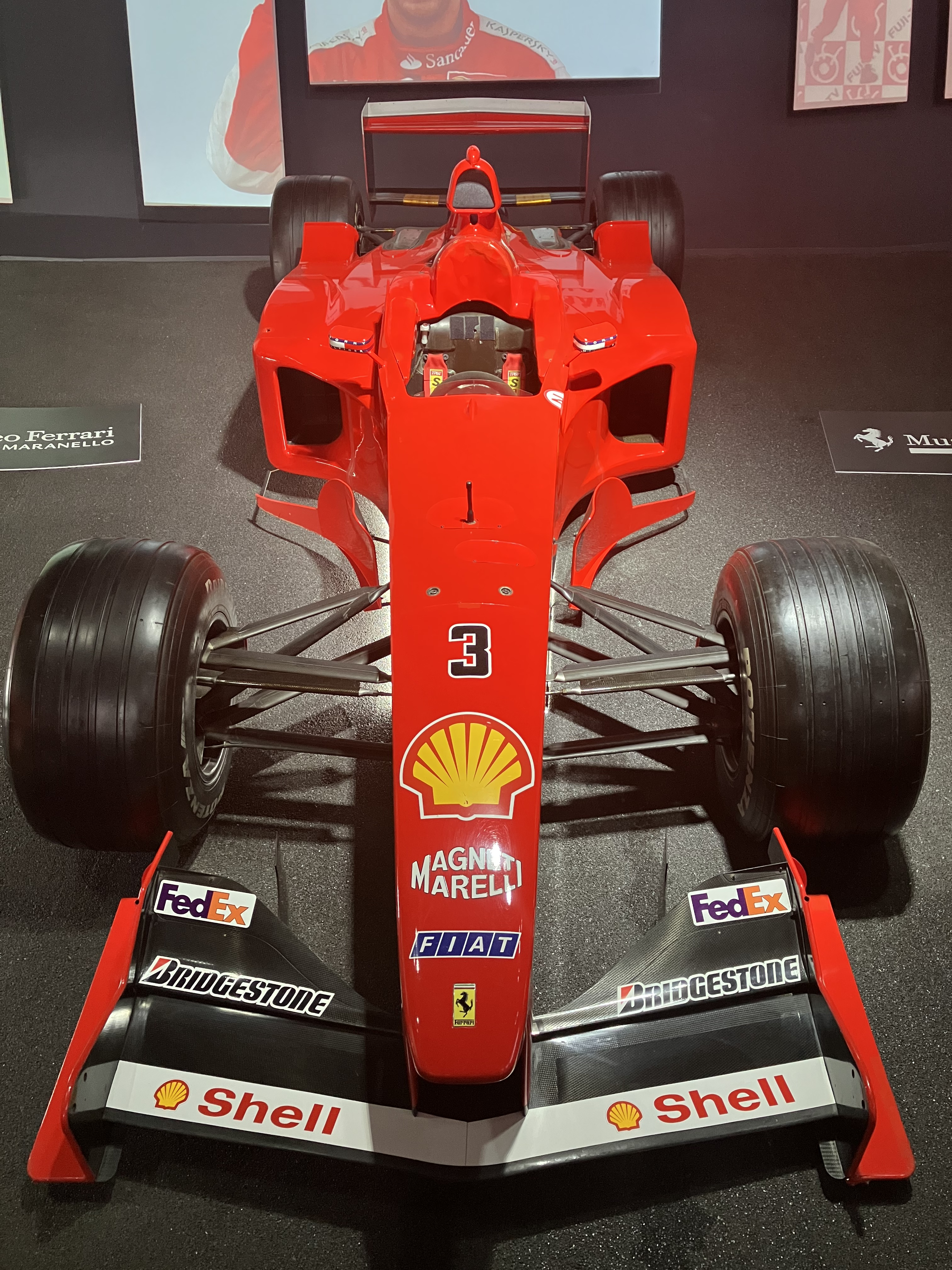
F399 at the Museo Ferrari

The chassis of the Ferrari F399 was almost identical to its predecessor, the F300. It had a reinforced carbon-fibre and honeycomb monocoque structure that could protect the driver from most accidents. The engine was an mid-engine, rear wheel drive layout.

Changes from the F300 were a slightly modified front wing, the sidepods were waisted, and the exhaust was improved in order so that Ferrari could push harder in their fight with McLaren.

The suspension for the front and rear areas of the car were pushrod/double wishbone suspension systems. The car also had wheel tethers on each wheel to prevent the tires detaching during an accident, a regulation still in force in Formula One to this day.

The engine was an 790 bhp (552 KW), 80-degree 3.0 litre V10 engine manufactured by Ferrari called the Tipo 048/B/C. It was mated to a 7-shift transmission, as used by almost all Formula One car until teams started using 8-shift transmission gearboxes in 2014.

The car used Shell fuel to power its engine while the tyres, which were designed by Bridgestone, now had four grooves on all four tyres instead of three grooves on the front tyres. The new tyres with four grooves were a new rule change for the 1999 season and onward in the V10 era of the sport.

== 1999 season ==
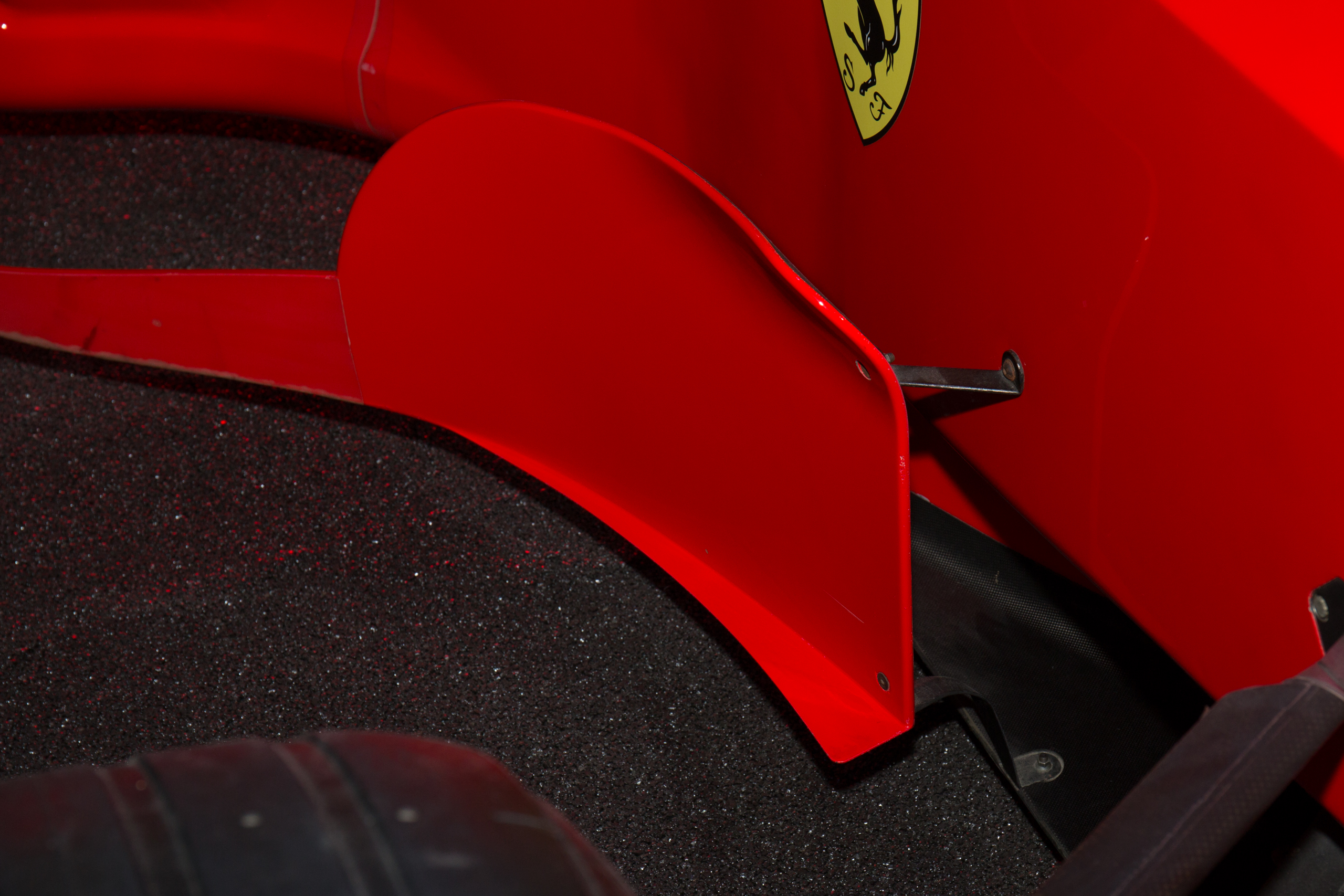
The Ferrari F399's Bargeboard that proved controversial in the inaugural Malaysian Grand Prix that season.

Early in the season the car showed huge performance with Irvine winning the opening round in Australia while Schumacher collected podiums along with wins at Imola and Monaco, thereby making Ferrari a serious threat to the McLaren duo of Mika Häkkinen and David Coulthard throughout much of the 1999 season.

While Irvine would also go on to win back-to-back victories at Austria and Germany along with the inaugural Malaysian Grand Prix, Häkkinen and McLaren had shown great consistency over the season despite four retirements over the course of the season. Ferrari's championship aspirations also took a beating after Schumacher had broken his leg at Silverstone, resulting in Ferrari replacing him with Mika Salo during the midway point of the season. Salo performed well, handing victory to Irvine in Germany and finishing third at Monza.

The team were briefly excluded from Malaysia after the stewards found out that their bargeboards were illegal, meaning that Häkkinen and McLaren were effectively handed their respective championships by default. However, Ferrari managed to appeal against the FIA's decision in court and both of their drivers were subsequently reinstated.

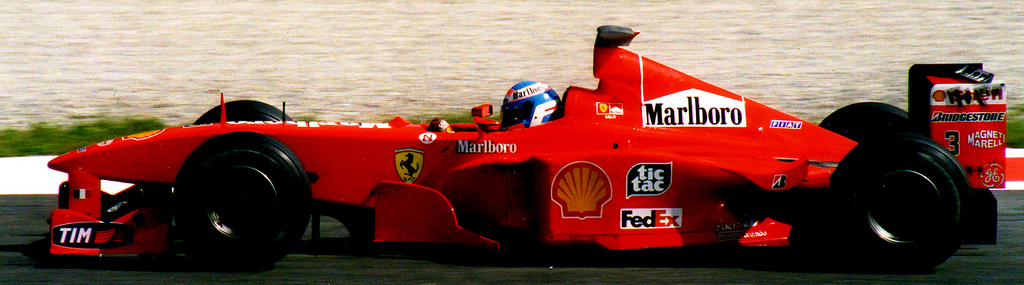
Mika Salo replaced Michael Schumacher during his injury from Austria to the Nürburgring

After the season had ended, Häkkinen had claimed the driver's title by two points from Irvine while Ferrari claimed the constructor's title by four points from McLaren.

== Sponsorship and livery ==
Ferrari used 'Marlboro' logos, except at the French, British, where they were replaced with a chevron and barcode. In Belgian, it was replaced with the text "Ferrari Formula One Team" and the "F1" logo.

== Complete Formula One results ==
(key) (results in bold indicate pole position; results in italics indicate fastest lap)

Year	Team	Engine	Tyres	Drivers	1	2	3	4	5	6	7	8	9	10	11	12	13	14	15	16	Points	WCC
1999	Ferrari	Ferrari 048 V10	**B**		AUS	BRA	SMR	MON	ESP	CAN	FRA	GBR	AUT	GER	HUN	BEL	ITA	EUR	MAL	JPN	**128**	**1st**
1999	Ferrari	Ferrari 048 V10	**B**	Michael Schumacher	8	2	1	1	3	**Ret**	5	DNS							**2**	**2**	**128**	**1st**
1999	Ferrari	Ferrari 048 V10	**B**	Mika Salo									9	2	12	7	3	Ret			**128**	**1st**
1999	Ferrari	Ferrari 048 V10	**B**	Eddie Irvine	1	5	Ret	2	4	3	6	2	1	1	3	4	6	7	1	3	**128**	**1st**
