= Ferrari F300 =

1998 Formula One racing car by Ferrari

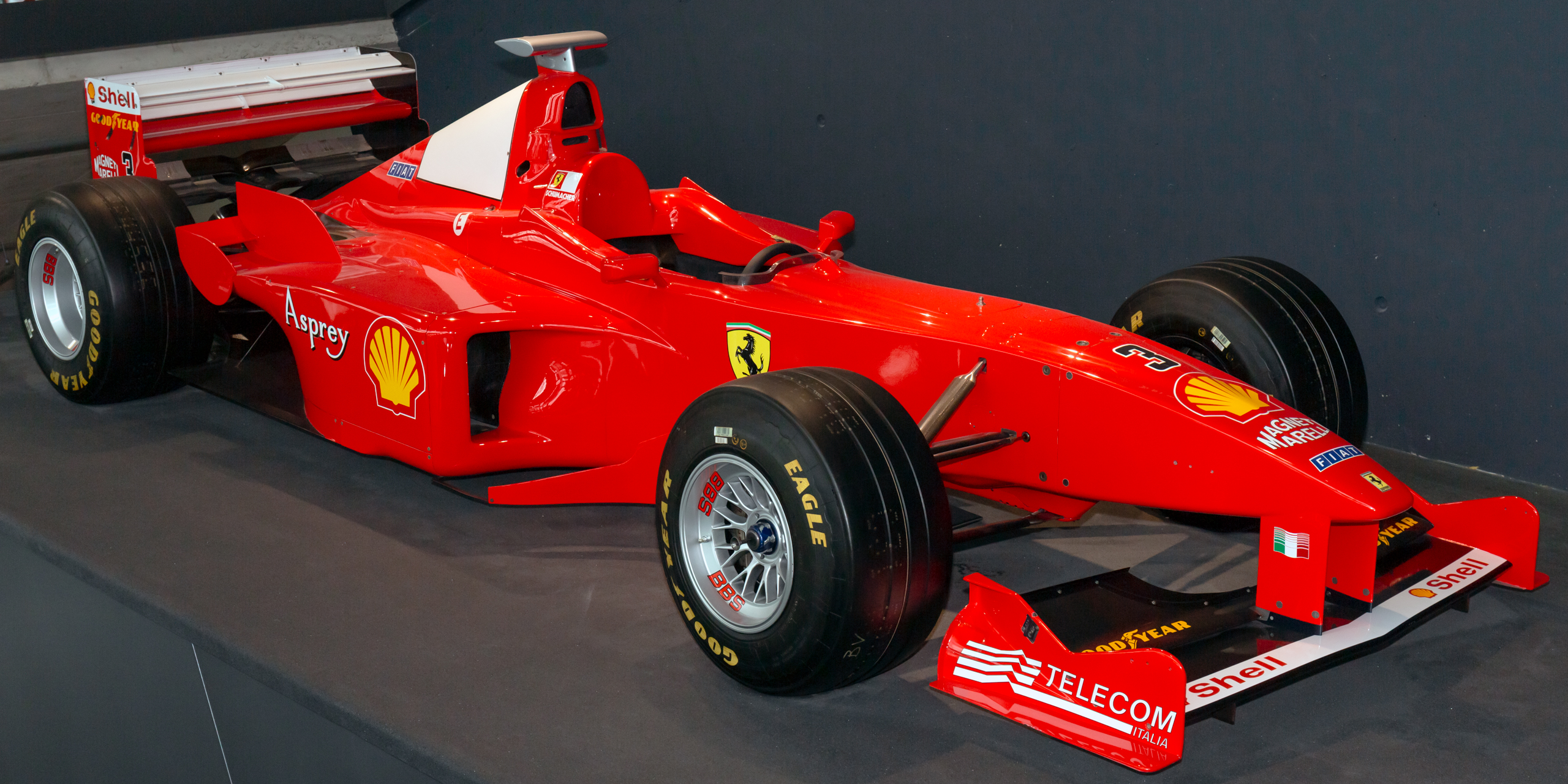
- Michael Schumacher's F300 on display at Michael Schumacher Private Collection
- Category: Formula One
- Constructor: Ferrari
- Designers: Ross Brawn (Technical Director); Rory Byrne (Chief Designer); Giorgio Ascanelli (Head of R&D); Aldo Costa (Head of Chassis Design); Willem Toet (Head of Aerodynamics); Nikolas Tombazis (Chief Aerodynamicist); Paolo Martinelli (Engine Technical Director); Gilles Simon (Engine Chief Designer)
- Predecessor: F310B
- Successor: F399

Technical specifications
- Chassis: Carbon-fibre and honeycomb composite structure
- Suspension (front): Double-wishbone pushrod suspension
- Suspension (rear): Double-wishbone pushrod suspension
- Engine: Ferrari Tipo 047/B/C 80-degree V10
- Transmission: Ferrari seven-speed longitudinal semi-automatic sequential
- Power: 805 hp (600 kW) @ 17,300 rpm
- Fuel: Shell
- Tyres: Goodyear

Competition history
- Notable entrants: Scuderia Ferrari Marlboro
- Notable drivers: 3. (Germany) Michael Schumacher; 4. (United Kingdom) Eddie Irvine
- Debut: 1998 Australian Grand Prix
- First win: 1998 Argentine Grand Prix
- Last win: 1998 Italian Grand Prix
- Last event: 1998 Japanese Grand Prix
Races	Wins	Podiums	Poles	F/Laps
16	6	19	3	6
- Constructors' Championships: 0
- Drivers' Championships: 0

The Ferrari F300 was a Formula One car that the Ferrari team competed with for the 1998 Formula One World Championship. The chassis was designed by Rory Byrne, Giorgio Ascanelli, Aldo Costa, Willem Toet, and Nikolas Tombazis, with Ross Brawn playing a vital role in leading the production of the car as the team's technical director and Paolo Martinelli assisted by Giles Simon (engine design and development) and Pino D'Agostino (engine operations). It was powered by the 3-litre Ferrari Tipo 047 V10 engine and designed around a narrower track as mandated by the FIA in a series of regulation changes for that season.

== Overview ==
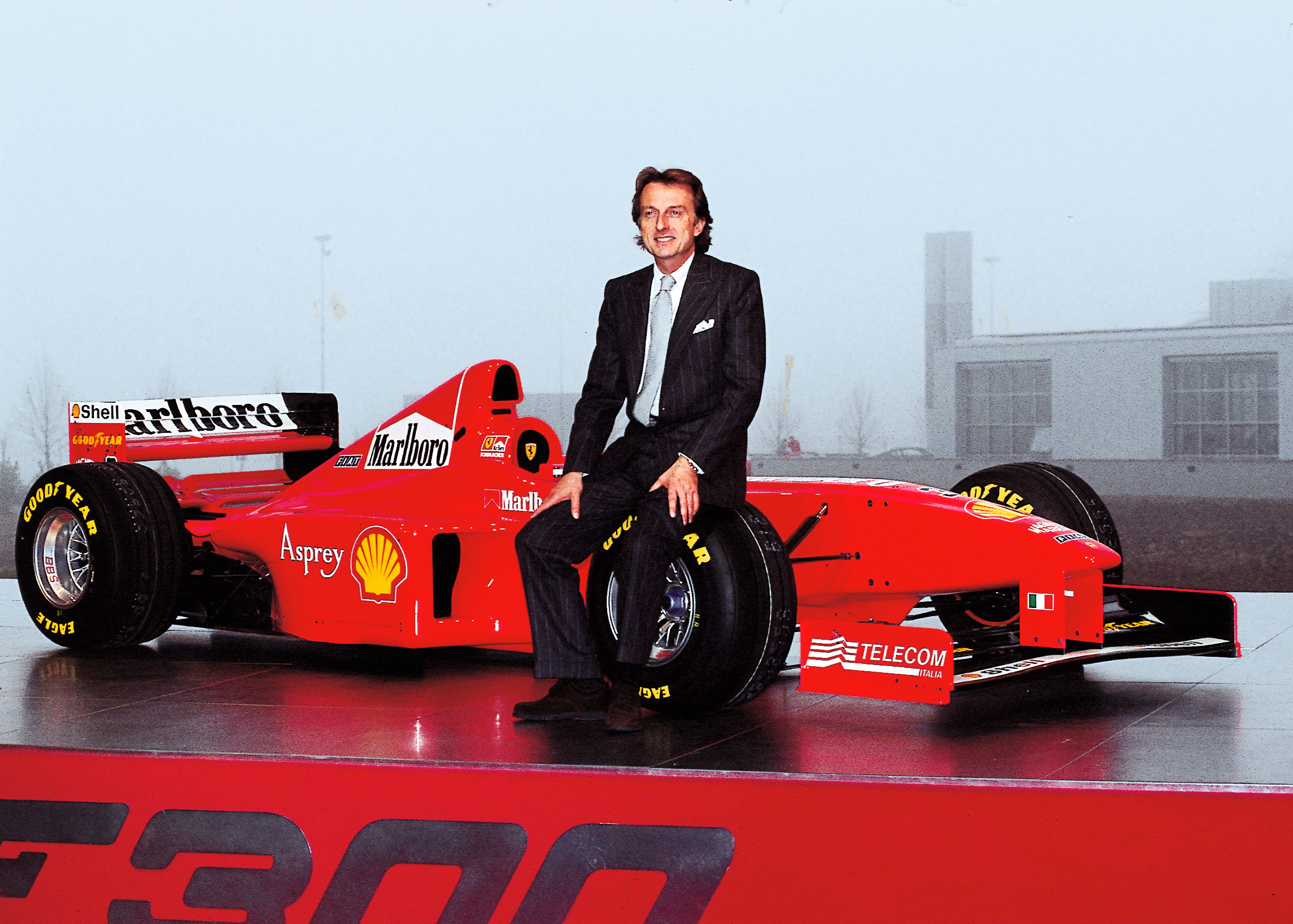
Luca di Montezemolo at the launch of the F300, January 1998

Strongly resembling the previous season's Ferrari F310B, albeit with a narrower track and redesigned sidepods, the F300 was a competitive and reliable car; however, it was still aerodynamically inferior to the McLaren MP4/13. Despite this, Michael Schumacher battled his way to second place in the world championship behind Mika Häkkinen. Ferrari also finished as runners-up in the Constructors' Championship. The car was an excellent base for the dominance that Ferrari would achieve in the following seasons. Schumacher battled back from a large deficit to be on the same point total as Häkkinen following his sixth win of the season at Monza, but having been beaten narrowly by Häkkinen at Nürburgring in the penultimate round, the championship title was no longer in Schumacher's own destiny. Stalling the car on the grid in the finale at Suzuka definitely made sure the title was lost, compounded by a puncture following a fightback that might have landed a podium. Even a podium would have been in vain as Häkkinen also won that race. Häkkinen finished with 100 points compared with 86 for Schumacher. Eddie Irvine finished fourth in the championship, being the second-placed finisher in both 1-2's Ferrari scored in France and Italy. Schumacher won six races but Irvine once again did not record a single win. A fourth was his highest championship finish to that date though and he collected many podium finishes over the course of the campaign.

As with all Formula 1 cars, the F300 was heavily and consistently revised during the 1998 season. At the Argentine Grand Prix, a wider front tyre from Goodyear was introduced which significantly improved the handling of the car. "X-wings" were introduced at the San Marino Grand Prix, but were later banned before the Spanish Grand Prix due to safety reasons. A longer wheelbase version of the car was introduced for the German and Belgian Grands Prix, and a new spec engine was also designed for the title-deciding Japanese Grand Prix. The most significant upgrade to the car was introduced at the Canadian Grand Prix, where it received a new diffuser, new rear body panels, a new delta-shaped front wing, and top-exiting exhausts, the latter of which improved cooling and aerodynamics of the car which was so effective that many other teams copied the design. This overhaul coincided with a hat trick of wins for Schumacher.

During testing in May of that season, the F300 was rumoured to have been fitted with Bridgestone tyres, possibly as a prelude to switching tyre suppliers before Goodyear withdrew from F1 at the end of the season. Schumacher played down the rumours.

== Livery ==
Ferrari used Marlboro logos, except at the French, British and German Grands Prix.

At the Belgian Grand Prix, Ferrari celebrated their 600th Grand Prix and their cars carried a logo celebrating the achievement behind the seat and sidepods.

== Complete Formula One results ==
(key) (results in bold indicate pole position; results in italics indicate fastest lap)

Year	Team	Engine	Tyres	Drivers	1	2	3	4	5	6	7	8	9	10	11	12	13	14	15	16	Points	WCC
1998	Ferrari	Ferrari 047 V10	**G**		AUS	BRA	ARG	SMR	ESP	MON	CAN	FRA	GBR	AUT	GER	HUN	BEL	ITA	LUX	JPN	**133**	**2nd**
1998	Ferrari	Ferrari 047 V10	**G**	Michael Schumacher	Ret	3	1	2	3	10	1	1	1	3	5	1	Ret	**1**	**2**	**Ret**	**133**	**2nd**
1998	Ferrari	Ferrari 047 V10	**G**	Eddie Irvine	4	8	3	3	Ret	3	3	2	3	4	8	Ret	Ret	2	4	2	**133**	**2nd**
