= Paolo Martinelli (engineer) =

Italian engineer (born 1952)

- Born: 29 September 1952 (age 73)

Paolo Martinelli (born 29 September 1952) is an Italian engineer best known for his position as head of Scuderia Ferrari's Engine Department from 1994 to 2006.

== Career ==
Born in Modena, Martinelli studied mechanical engineering at Bologna University, graduating in 1978. He joined Ferrari immediately, at first working on engine design for the company's production cars. In 1994, he was appointed head of the Formula One team's Engine Department, where he decided to ditch the commitment to running V12 engines in favour of V10s. The first V10-powered Ferrari raced in 1996, and the team used this configuration to win five Drivers' and six Constructors' Championships before rules were brought in stipulating the use of V8s for 2006. Martinelli's favorite race was the 2000 Japanese Grand Prix at Suzuka which Michael Schumacher won in a Ferrari. In October 2006, Martinelli moved to an executive role within Fiat, Ferrari's parent company. His position in Ferrari was taken over by Gilles Simon.
