= Gilles Simon (Formula One) =

French Formula One engineer and designer (born 1958)

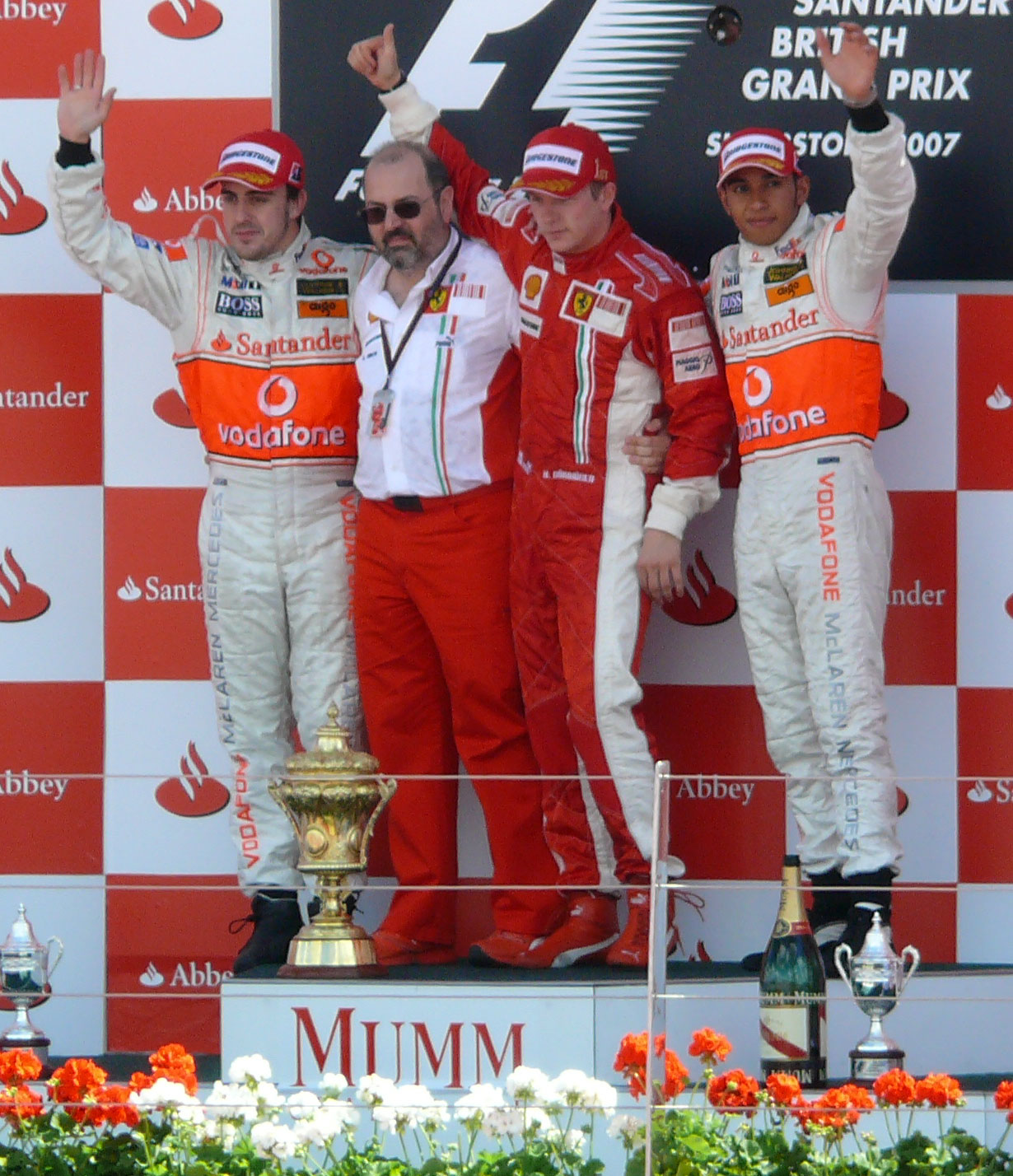
- Simon (between Fernando Alonso and Kimi Räikkönen) on the podium of the 2007 British Grand Prix.
- Born: 14 June 1958 (age 68); Oujda, Morocco
- Occupations: Head of the Ferrari Formula One team's Engine Department, 2007–2009; Fédération Internationale de l'Automobile advisor (2010)

Gilles Simon (born 14 June 1958 in Oujda, Morocco) is a French Formula One engineer and designer.

== Career ==
Simon studied at the École des Mines, one of France's top engineering schools. He graduated in 1984 and joined the Renault team, where he worked in R&D for four years. He was then hired by Peugeot and worked on the marque's V10 engine, which would ultimately achieve success in their Le Mans effort in the early 1990s.

In 1993, Simon followed compatriot Jean Todt to Ferrari, assisting Paolo Martinelli in the Engine and Electronics Department. Following the Italian's move to an executive role within Fiat, Simon took over as head of the department in October 2006. Simon left his position in October 2009, and was replaced by Luca Marmorini.

In December 2009, FIA President Jean Todt revealed that Simon is to join a working group to investigate new energies and environmentally friendly technology in motorsport.

In July 2011, Simon left his FIA role to join Propulsion Universelle et Récuperation d'Énergie (PURE), a new F1 engine supplier which aimed to enter the sport in 2014.

In 2013 Simon was hired as a consultant by Honda to work on their Formula One engine. He parted company with the Japanese marque in 2017.
