= Ferrari F2002 =

2002 Formula One racing car by Ferrari

Ferrari F2002 Ferrari F2002B
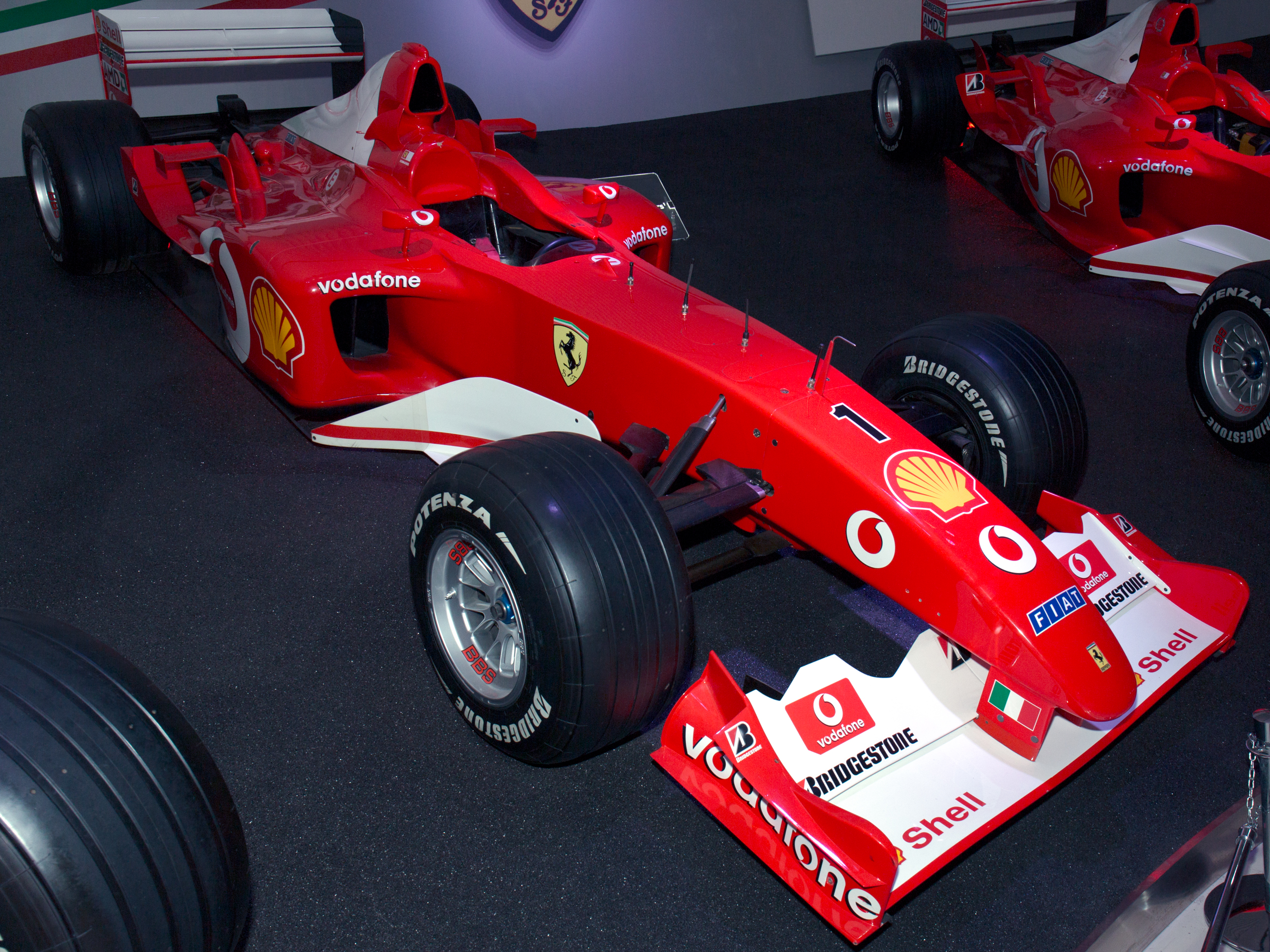
- Michael Schumacher's F2002 on display at Museo Ferrari
- Category: Formula One
- Constructor: Ferrari
- Designers: Ross Brawn (Technical Director); Rory Byrne (Chief Designer); Ignazio Lunetta (Head of R&D); Aldo Costa (Head of Chassis Design); Marco Fainello (Head of Vehicle Dynamics); Roberto Dalla (Head of Electronics); Nikolas Tombazis (Head of Aerodynamics); James Allison (Chief Aerodynamicist); Paolo Martinelli (Engine Technical Director); Gilles Simon (Engine Chief Designer)
- Predecessor: F2001B
- Successor: F2003-GA

Technical specifications
- Chassis: Moulded carbon fibre & Honeycomb composite structure
- Suspension (front): Independent suspension, pushrod activated torsion springs
- Suspension (rear): Independent suspension, pushrod activated torsion springs
- Length: 4,495 mm (177 in)
- Width: 1,796 mm (71 in)
- Height: 959 mm (38 in)
- Engine: Ferrari Tipo 051/B/C , 3.0 L (3,000 cc; 183 cu in) , 90° V10 , Naturally Aspirated , in a mid-mounted, rear-wheel-drive layout
- Transmission: 7-speed semi-automatic sequential Limited-slip Differential gearbox + reverse
- Power: 835 horsepower (623 kW) @ 17,800 rpm
- Weight: 600 kg (1,323 lb)
- Fuel: Shell Fuel
- Lubricants: Shell Lubricant
- Brakes: Carbon brake discs, pads and calipers
- Tyres: Bridgestone BBS Racing Wheels : 13"

Competition history
- Notable entrants: Scuderia Ferrari Marlboro
- Notable drivers: 1. (Germany) Michael Schumacher; 2. (Brazil) Rubens Barrichello
- Debut: 2002 Brazilian Grand Prix
- First win: 2002 Brazilian Grand Prix
- Last win: 2003 San Marino Grand Prix
- Last event: 2003 San Marino Grand Prix
Races	Wins	Podiums	Poles	F/Laps
19	15	28	11	15
- Constructors' Championships: 2 (2002 & 2003)
- Drivers' Championships: 2 (2002 & 2003)

The Ferrari F2002 was a highly successful Formula One Car used by Scuderia Ferrari Marlboro as its entry for competition in the 2002 Formula One season. The chassis was designed by Rory Byrne, Ignazio Lunetta, Aldo Costa, Marco Fainello, Nikolas Tombazis and James Allison and Paolo Martinelli, assisted by Giles Simon (engine design and development) and Pino D'Agostino (engine operations), under the overall leadership of Ross Brawn who was the team's Technical Director and Jean Todt the team Manager. It won fifteen Grands Prix, from a total of nineteen races in 2002 and 2003. It is widely regarded as one of the most successful Formula One car designs of all time, as Michael Schumacher drove it to a then record-equaling fifth world drivers' title in 2002, while easily clinching the 2002 constructors' title with as many points as all other teams put together.

== Overview ==
The car was much lighter than its predecessor, the F2001. It was powered by the 3.0-litre Tipo 051 V10 engine which initially produced 835 horsepower (623 kW) at 17,800 rpm. In qualifying mode, however, the engine developed up to 900 horsepower (670 kW) at 19,000 rpm. To ensure durability and reliability, the engine performance was reduced during the race where it still produced 865 horsepower (645 kW) at a maximum 18,600 rpm. The engine had a very low centre of gravity, which ensured excellent handling. The new 051 engine was not the strongest engine of 2002, only being beaten out by the BMW P81 engine used by the Williams team (which produced 940 horsepower (700 kW)); but the 051 was lighter, more compact, very fuel-efficient, and very driveable.

An innovative and very small clutchless gearbox allowing ultra-quick changes had been designed, and because the unit was so small, the rear end aerodynamics were extremely tightly packaged into the honeycomb structure.. Bridgestone developed special tyres, suited specifically for the car.

Aerodynamically, the Ferrari was well ahead of the contemporary Williams-BMW but perhaps a little down on power, and on a par with, or slightly ahead of the 2002 season's McLaren car. Williams in trying to solve their 2001 car's reliability problems were forced to "play it safe" for 2002, while McLaren's deficiency was due to the decision to stick with Michelin tyres as well as Mercedes struggling to design a beryllium-less engine for 2002.

Using the Pomeroy Index system, Motor Sport magazine recently determined that the F2002 is the fastest Formula One car of all time. However, the Ferrari F2004 achieved better qualifying lap times at 12 of the courses which were raced by both cars (only the 2002 French Grand Prix, 2002 Belgian Grand Prix and 2002 Japanese Grand Prix was faster than the 2004 races, with two of these being due to rain). In terms of single lap performance while not as dominant as the McLaren MP4/4 in 1988 nor the Williams FW14B in 1992, both cars which each scored 15 poles in their respective season, the Ferrari F2002 scored 10 poles but was more reliable as well as relatively faster on Sundays than the MP4/4 and FW14B.

== Team personnel behind the F2002 ==
The majority of the conceptual design work for the Ferrari F2002 was by Ferrari's legendary South African chassis designer Rory Byrne and the engine design by Ferrari's Paolo Martinelli. The project was overseen by the team's technical director Ross Brawn. A vast army of other team personnel oversaw the running of the team and the project.

== Concept and design ==
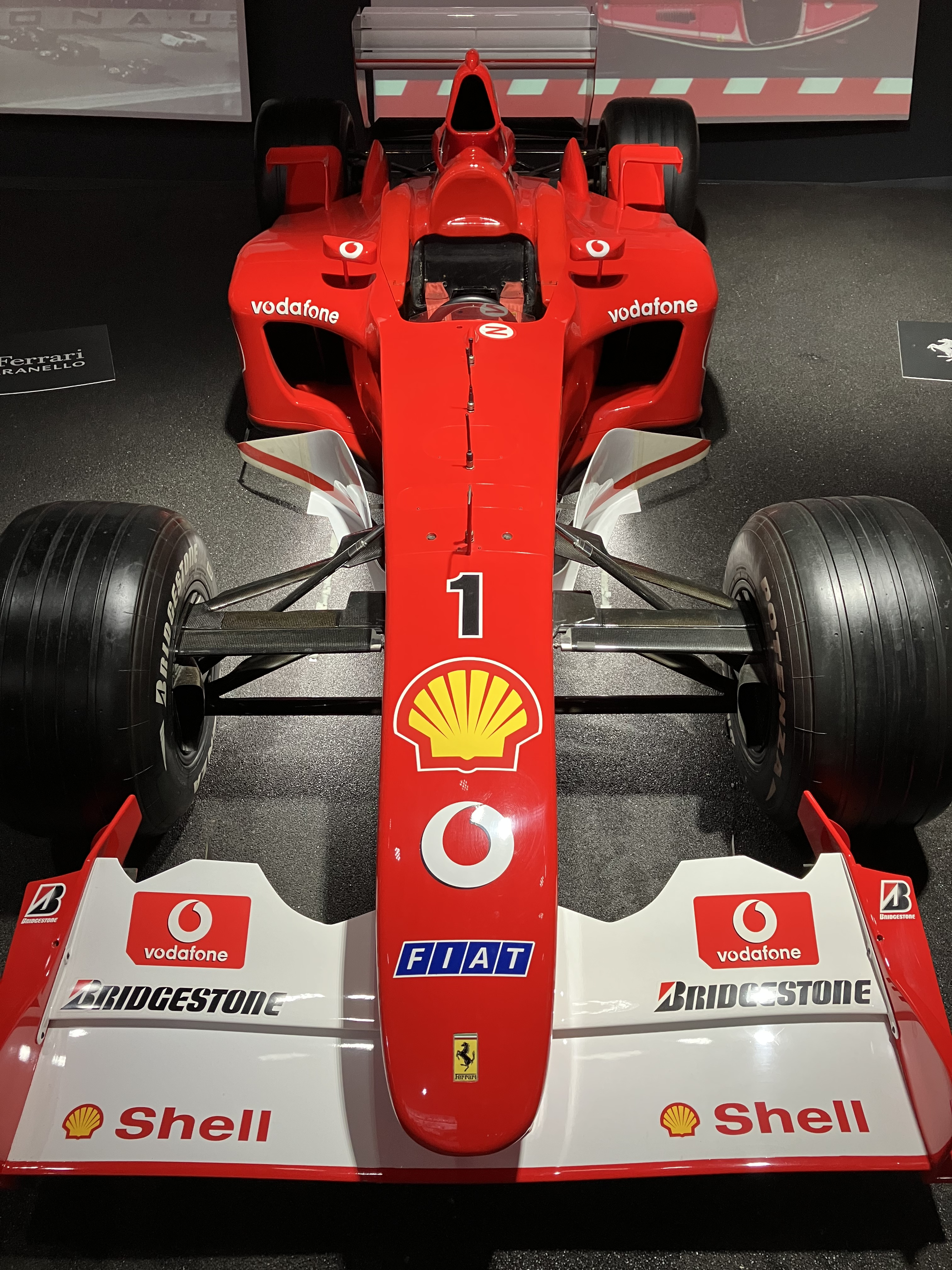
F2002 at the Museo Ferrari

Prior to the introduction of the F2002, Ferrari had used a revised version of their championship-winning Ferrari F2001 for the first few races of 2002.

The F2002 was not only a development of the championship-winning Ferrari F2001, but a completely revolutionary model involving many technologies not seen previously. Since the late 1990s, Ferrari had been using the same basic concept and design of gearbox and although this had been used to win drivers and constructors titles from 1999 onwards the technical team pushed ahead with a new version instead. The new replacement gearbox casing was made of ultra-lightweight and higher strength titanium, thus reducing its weight by as much as 15% and lowering the car's centre of gravity. The new compact design allowed for great advancement in the bodywork and increasing the car's aerodynamic efficiency at the rear.

However such was the extent of the gearbox casing redesign that the aerodynamic work was left behind schedule and initially did not represent the same performance gains as the mechanical engineering. Thus Ferrari continued its design for another two months and only started used the F2002 from the third round of the 2002 season onwards, in the interim using the previous year's F2001 chassis, albeit with many alterations and the inclusion of the Ferrari 051 2002 engine.

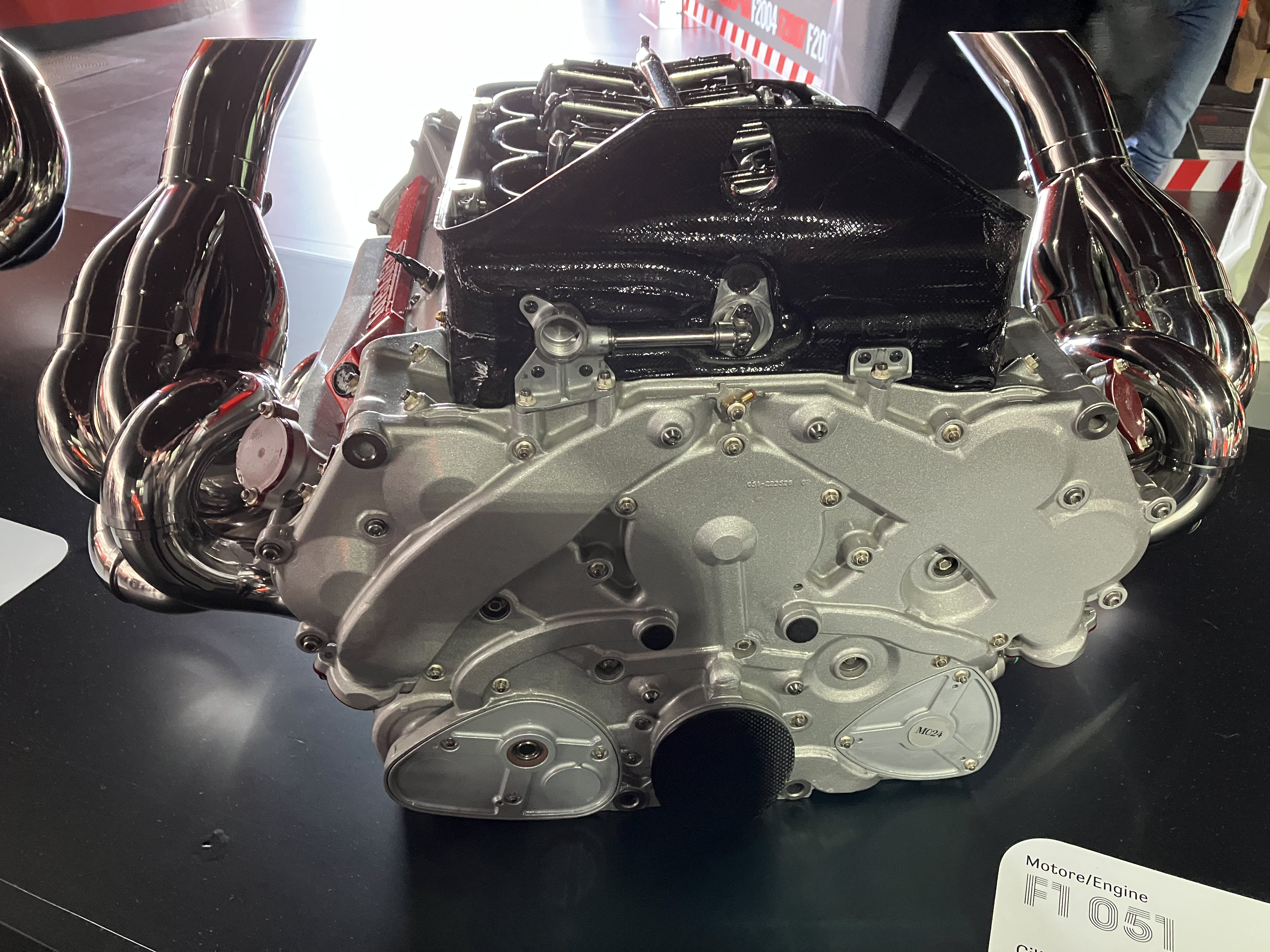
2002 Tipo 051

Other advancements on the car include the clutchless direct-shift technology within the gearbox, a new fluid traction control system to replace the previous 2001 traction control system and upright aerodynamically shaped periscopic exhaust outlets at the rear. The latter technology was incorporated both to use the hot exhaust gases for aerodynamic effect and to raise these gases higher and out the way of the rear suspension. On the previous occasions, Ferrari's non-chimneyed top exiting exhaust outlets had caused the rear suspension and other elements at the rear of the car to overheat or even melt when minor cracks occurred.

== Race history ==
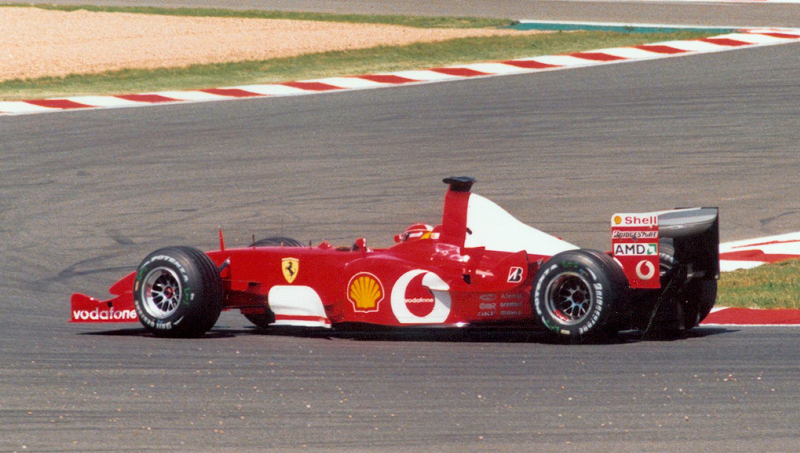
Michael Schumacher driving the F2002 at the 2002 French Grand Prix, the race at which he won the 2002 Drivers' Championship.

At its first race in Brazil, the F2002 was victorious, being driven by Michael Schumacher and continuing Ferrari's trend since 1999 for its cars to win on their debut. Michael Schumacher clinched second on the grid and after a first lap altercation with Juan Pablo Montoya, took a somewhat easy win from his brother Ralf's Williams. There was some controversy surrounding tyre allocation because the team only had one F2002 chassis at the race. Therefore, Schumacher's spare car was an F2001 chassis, and because the two chassis used different wheel rim designs each required separate wheels and tyres. It was thus argued that Schumacher had in-effect twice the allocation of tyres as any other driver. The controversy was managed by Ferrari agreeing to aggregate their tyre usage between the two cars, ensuring that Schumacher used the same total number of tyres as all the other drivers.

What followed was a season of domination, the likes of which had not been seen since McLaren's 1988 season. Between the two drivers, the F2002 brought the team nine 1-2 finishes, including five in a row. With the F2002, Schumacher scored 10 more victories, bringing his total for the season to 11 wins, setting a then-record for most in a season, while Rubens Barrichello scored four. The only race that the car failed to win was at Monaco, while the F2001 did not take the Malaysian GP. Furthermore, Schumacher finished every race on the podium, never finishing lower than second with the F2002. The German won the world championship in record time, clinching the title at the 11th race of the season in France. The two Ferrari drivers were comfortably first and second in the Drivers' Championship, and Ferrari scored as many points (221) as the other ten teams put together.

Such was Ferrari's dominance that Ferrari did not evolve the car further after the Belgian Grand Prix and was still significantly ahead for the rest of the season. Schumacher and Barrichello were criticized for swapping finishes at Austria and the United States - an event that would provoke a ban on team orders for the following seasons, and would be raised again in 2010 when Ferrari was also fined after appearing to instruct Felipe Massa to allow Fernando Alonso to win the German Grand Prix.

The F2002 (renamed the F2002B) was still competitive at the beginning of 2003, and Schumacher took the car's last win in that year's San Marino Grand Prix before it was replaced by the F2003-GA for the next race. The F2003-GA was not quite as successful as the F2002, and Schumacher only won the title by two points over McLaren's Kimi Räikkönen.

== Livery ==
The livery are similar to previous season design with subtle changes and received a new sponsorship deal from Vodafone, who were previously sponsored Benetton.

Ferrari used the 'Marlboro' logos, except at the British, French and United States Grands Prix.

== Legacy ==
In 2019, an F2002 chassis 219 that was driven by Schumacher and Barrichello was sold at auction at $6,643,750 by RM Sotheby's in Abu Dhabi, making it the second-most expensive Formula One car ever sold at auction.

The car was featured in F1 2002, Formula One 2002 and F1 Challenge '99-'02, and along with the F2004 and F2007, it was featured in F1 2017 and F1 2018 as a classic car.

== Complete Formula One results ==
(key) (results in bold indicate pole position; results in italics indicate fastest lap)

Year	Entrant	Chassis	Engine	Tyres	Drivers	1	2	3	4	5	6	7	8	9	10	11	12	13	14	15	16	17	Points	WCC
2002	Scuderia Ferrari Marlboro	F2002	Ferrari 051 V10	B		AUS	MAL	BRA	SMR	ESP	AUT	MON	CAN	EUR	GBR	FRA	GER	HUN	BEL	ITA	USA	JPN	**221***	1st
2002	Scuderia Ferrari Marlboro	F2002	Ferrari 051 V10	B	(Germany) Michael Schumacher			1	**1**	**1**	1	2	1	2	1	1	**1**	2	**1**	2	**2**	**1**	**221***	1st
2002	Scuderia Ferrari Marlboro	F2002	Ferrari 051 V10	B	(Brazil) Rubens Barrichello				2	DNS	**2**	7	3	1	2	DNS	4	**1**	2	1	1	2	**221***	1st
2003	Scuderia Ferrari Marlboro	F2002B	Ferrari 051B V10	B		AUS	MAL	BRA	SMR	ESP	AUT	MON	CAN	EUR	FRA	GBR	GER	HUN	ITA	USA	JPN		158**	1st
2003	Scuderia Ferrari Marlboro	F2002B	Ferrari 051B V10	B	(Germany) Michael Schumacher	**4**	6	Ret	**1**														158**	1st
2003	Scuderia Ferrari Marlboro	F2002B	Ferrari 051B V10	B	(Brazil) Rubens Barrichello	Ret	2	**Ret**	3														158**	1st

* 14 points with the F2001B
** 126 points scored with the F2003-GA

Awards
Preceded by Ferrari F2001	Autosport; Racing Car Of The Year; 2002	Succeeded by Bentley Speed 8
