= Museo Ferrari =

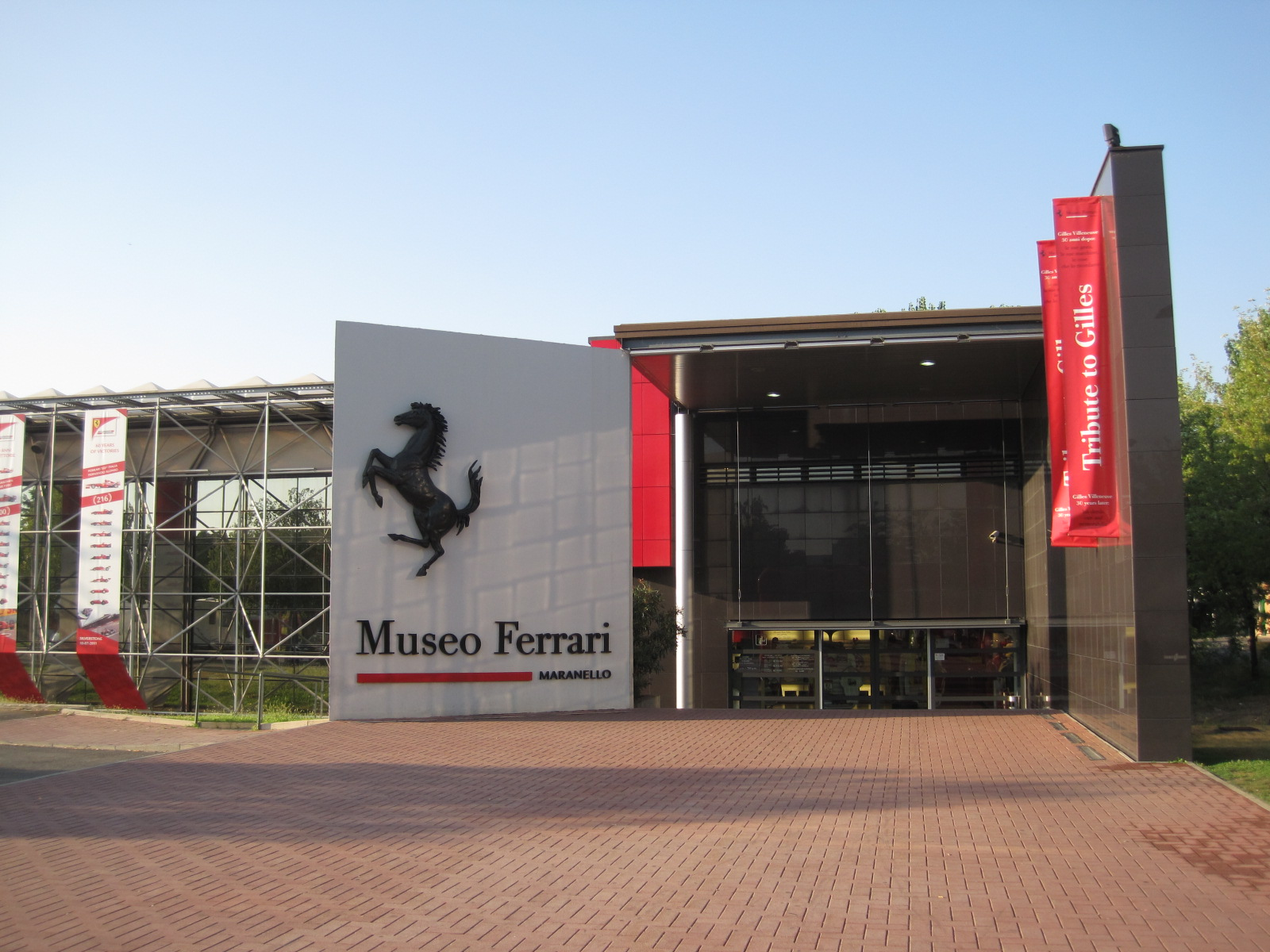
- The museum entrance
- Former name: Galleria Ferrari
- Established: February 1990; 36 years ago
- Location: Via Dino Ferrari 43; 41053 Maranello (MO); Italy
- Type: Automobile museum
- Director: Michele Pignatti Morano
- Website: museomaranello.ferrari.com

Museo Ferrari (previously known as Galleria Ferrari) is a Ferrari company museum dedicated to the Ferrari sports car marque. The museum is not purely for cars; there are also trophies, photographs and other historical objects relating to the Italian motor racing industry. In addition to that, the exhibition introduces technological innovations, some of which had made the transition from racing cars to road cars.

It is located just 300 m (980 ft) from the Ferrari factory in Ferrari's home town of Maranello, near Modena, Italy.

The museum first opened in February 1990, with a new wing being added in October 2004. Ferrari itself has run the museum since 1995. The total surface area is now 2,500 square metres. The number of annual visitors to the museum is around 180,000.

The exhibits are mostly a combination of Ferrari road and track cars.

== Exhibits ==
=== Michael 50 ===
Michael 50 was an exhibition that opened on 3 January 2019, timed to coincide with Michael Schumacher's 50th birthday, as a tribute to Schumacher's Formula One career. The exhibit was organized in cooperation with Keep Fighting Foundation, a non-profit foundation that supports Schumacher's charitable work. One part of the exhibition, The Hall of Victories, displayed some of the most important Ferrari cars driven by Schumacher in his 11 years with the Scuderia Ferrari team:

- Ferrari F310 (1996)
- Ferrari F399 (1999)
- Ferrari F1-2000 (2000)
- Ferrari F2001 (2001)
- Ferrari F2002 (2002)
- Ferrari F2003-GA (2003)
- Ferrari F2004 (2004)
- Ferrari 248 F1 (2006)

The exhibition featured two road cars whose development Schumacher has contributed to:

- Ferrari 430 Scuderia (2007)
- Ferrari California (2008)

The black FXX Evoluzione number 30 was not included in the exhibition.

On 1 February 2019 the exhibition was visited by Schumacher's son Mick, who had recently signed with the Ferrari Driver Academy.

== Gallery ==
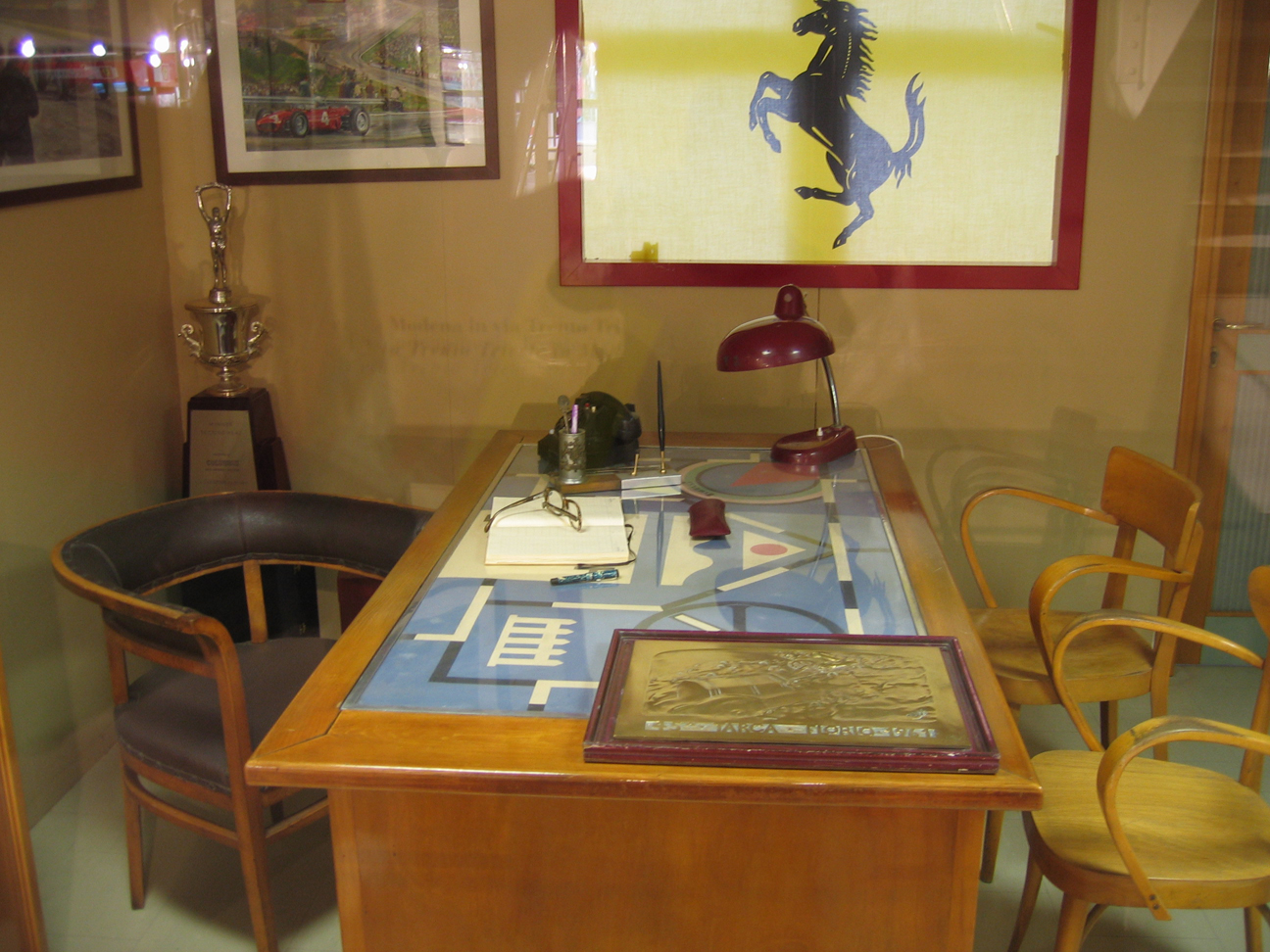
A mock up of Enzo Ferrari's office

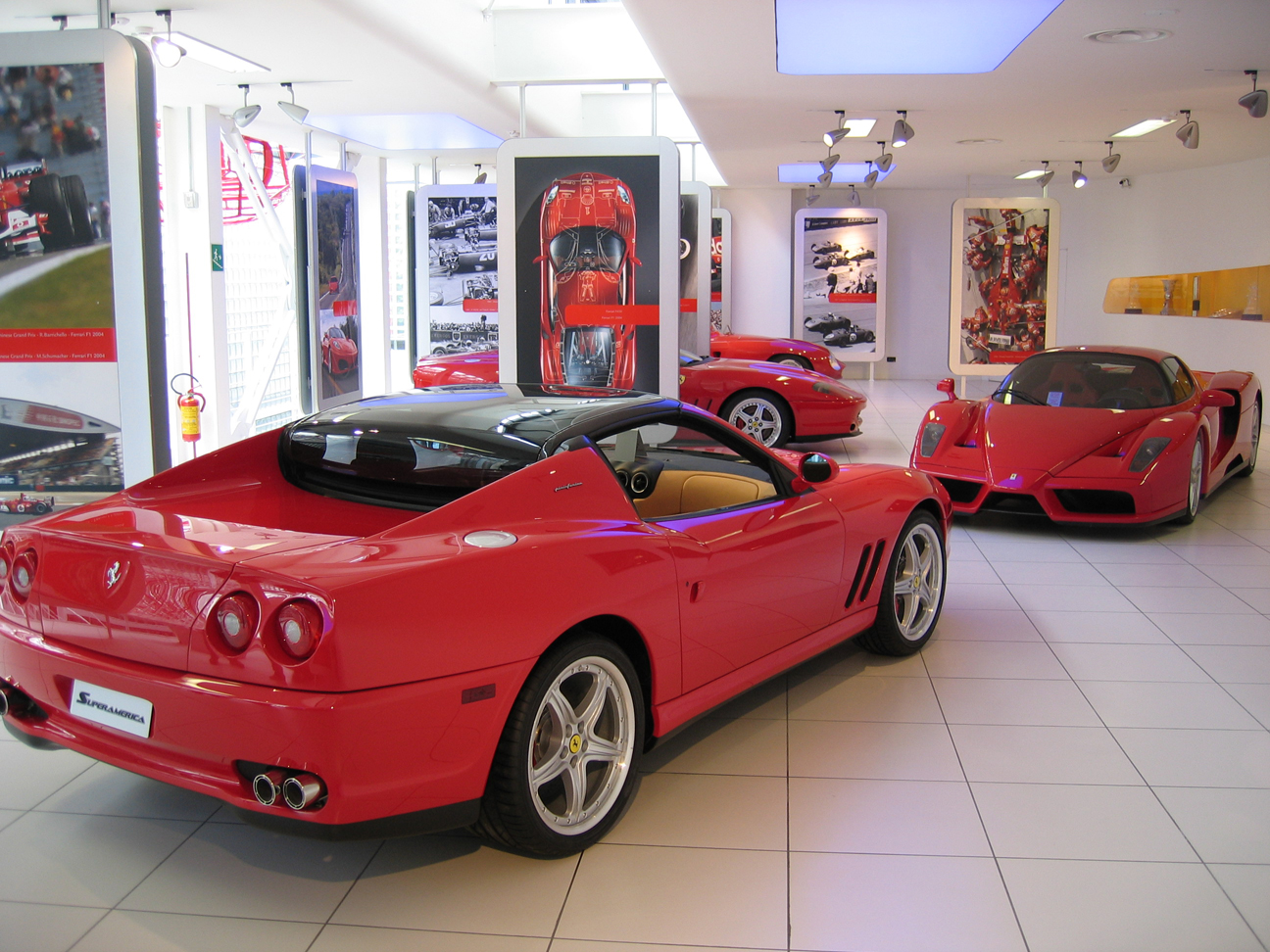
Some cars on the first floor

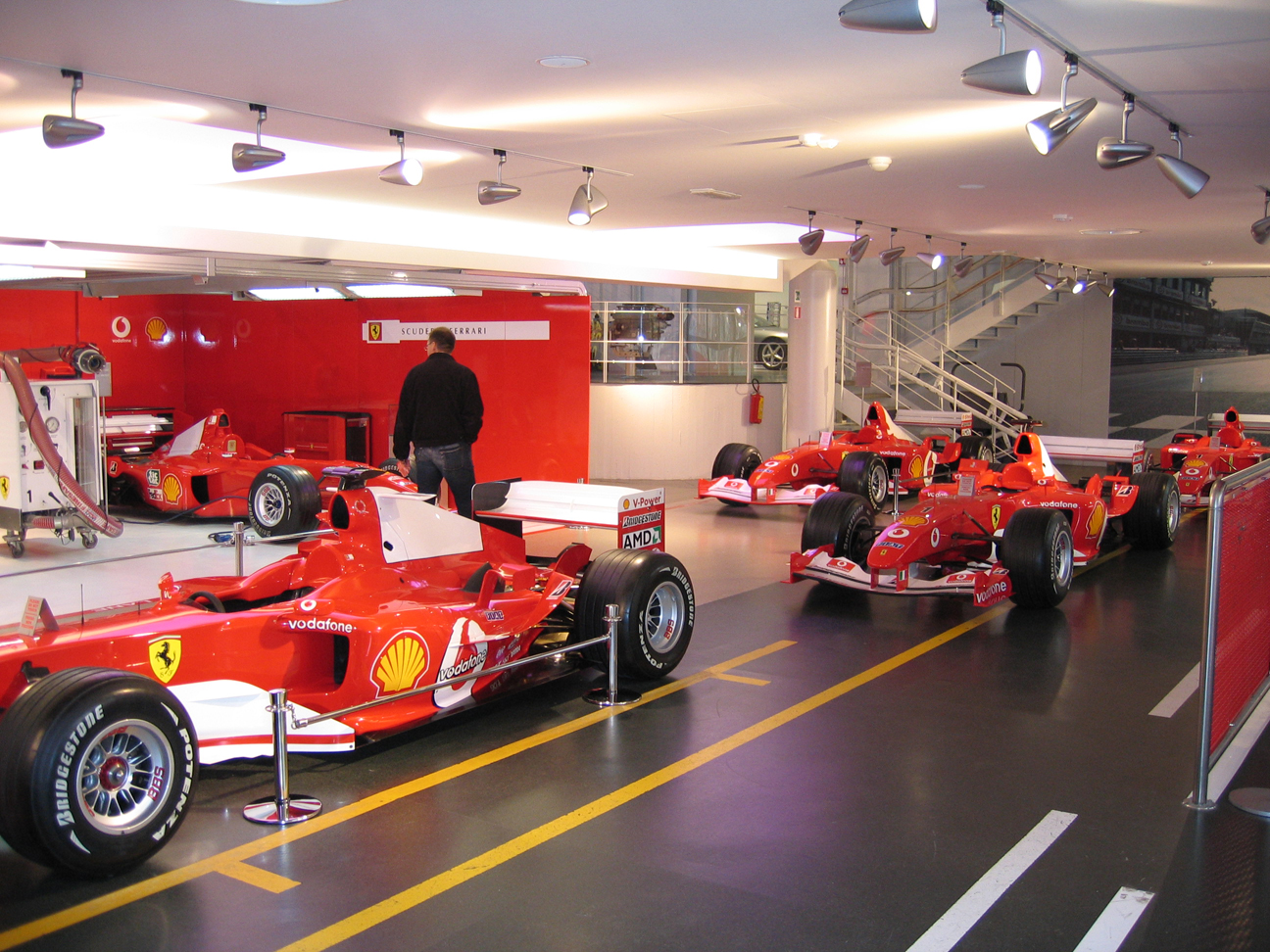
Michael Schumacher era F1 cars

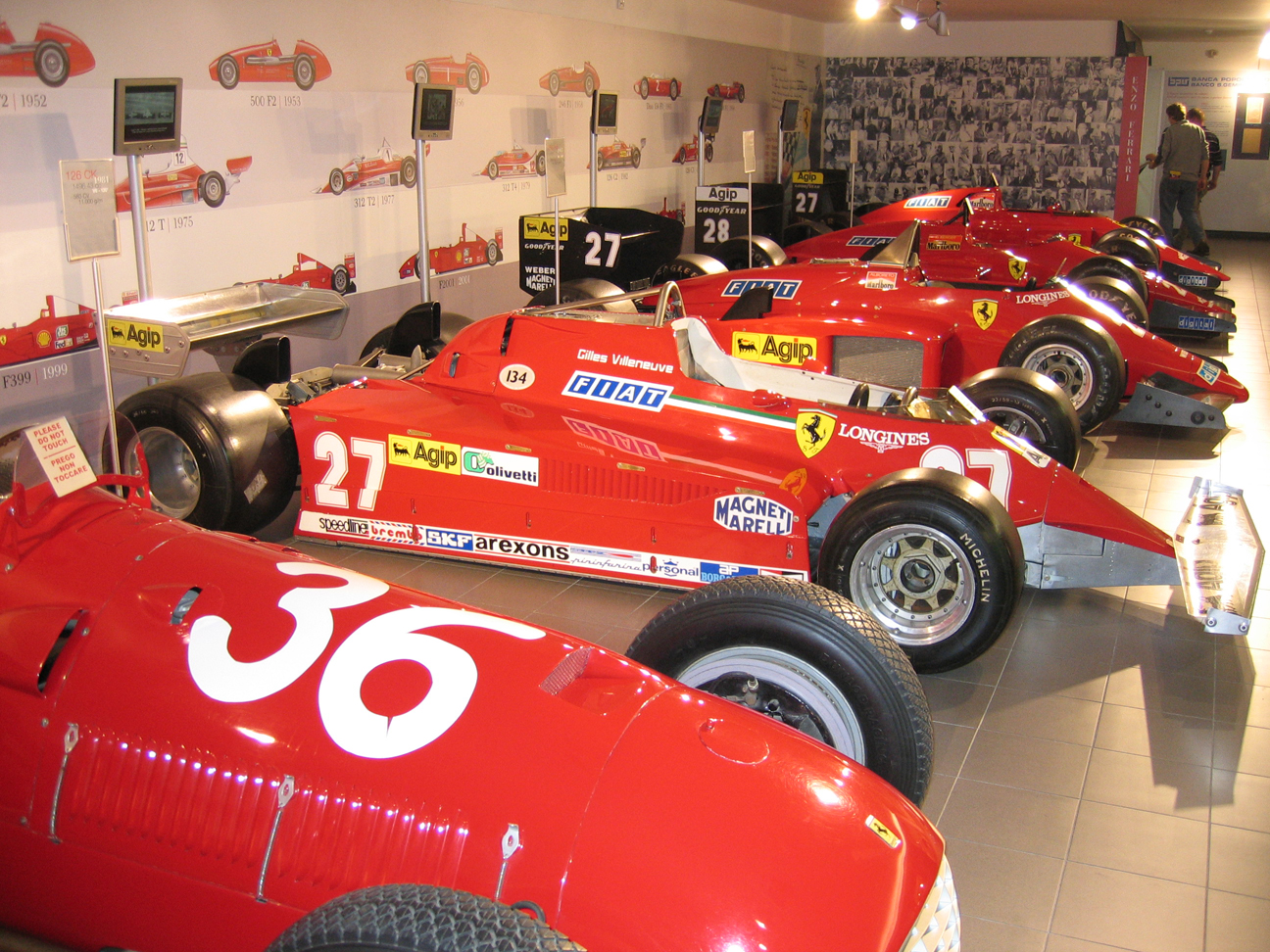
Ferrari F1 cars

== See also ==
- Museo Casa Enzo Ferrari
