= Ferrari F2004 =

2004 Formula One racing car by Ferrari

Ferrari F2004 Ferrari F2004M
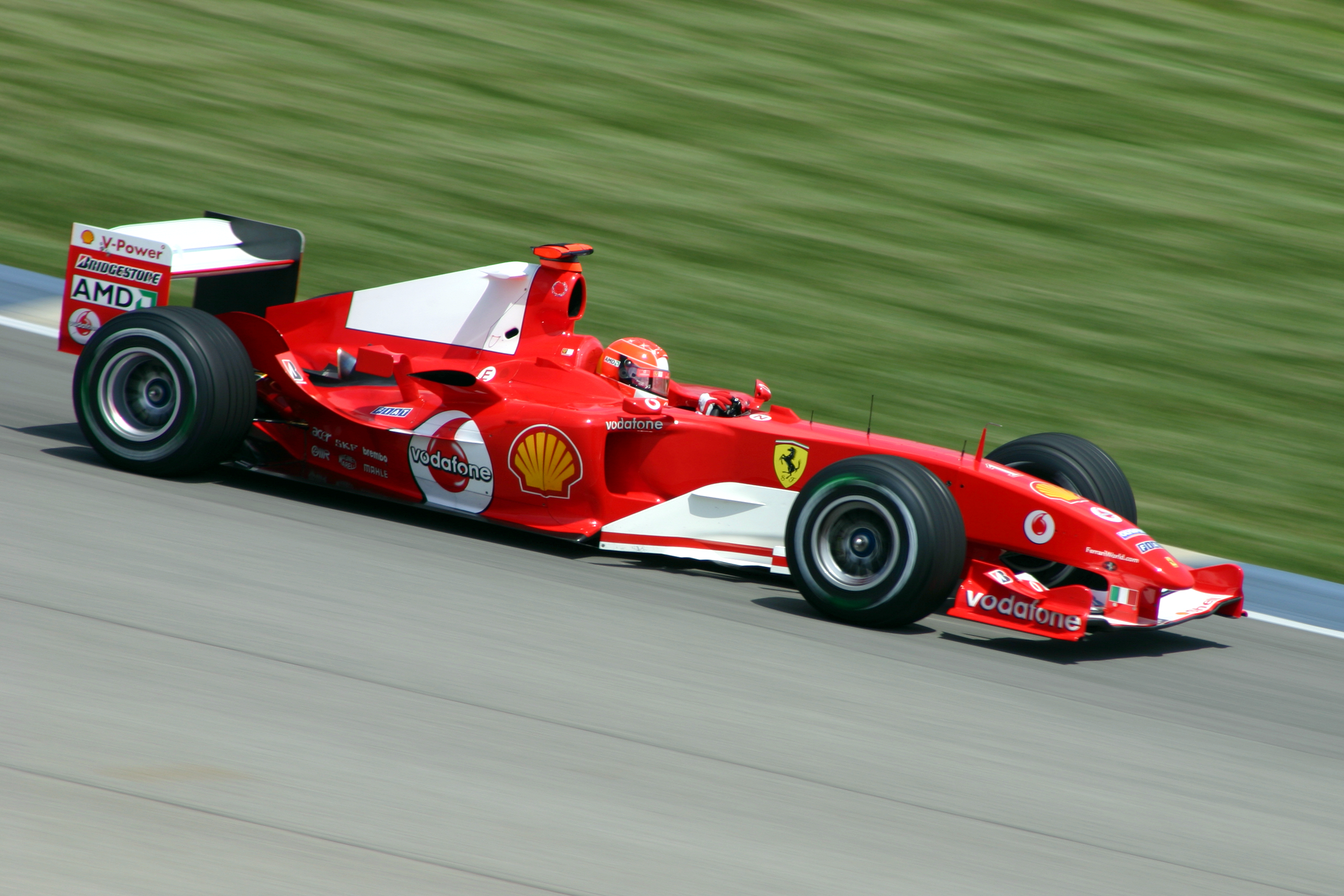
- Michael Schumacher driving the F2004 at the 2004 United States Grand Prix
- Category: Formula One
- Constructor: Scuderia Ferrari
- Designers: Ross Brawn (Technical Director); Rory Byrne (Chief Designer); Ignazio Lunetta (Head of R&D); Aldo Costa (Head of Chassis Design); Marco Fainello (Head of Vehicle Dynamics); Roberto Dalla (Head of Electronics); John Iley (Head of Aerodynamics); James Allison (Chief Aerodynamicist); Paolo Martinelli (Engine Technical Director); Gilles Simon (Engine Chief Designer)
- Predecessor: F2003-GA
- Successor: F2005

Technical specifications
- Chassis: Moulded carbon fibre and honeycomb composite structure
- Suspension (front): Independent suspension, pushrod activated torsion springs
- Suspension (rear): Independent suspension, pushrod activated torsion springs
- Length: 4,545 mm (179 in)
- Width: 1,796 mm (71 in)
- Height: 959 mm (38 in)
- Engine: Ferrari Tipo 053 3.0 L (183 cu in) V10 (90°) (max: 18800 rpm) naturally-aspirated in a mid-mounted, rear-wheel drive layout
- Transmission: In-house Ferrari 7-speed + 1 reverse sequential, semi-automatic paddle-shift with limited-slip differential
- Power: 865 horsepower (645 kW) @ 18,300 rpm (race-spec); 900–940 horsepower (670–700 kW) @ 19,000 rpm (qualifying trim)
- Weight: 605 kg (1,334 lb)
- Fuel: Shell Fuel
- Lubricants: Shell Lubricant
- Brakes: Carbon brake discs, pads, and calipers
- Tyres: Bridgestone BBS Racing Wheels : 13"

Competition history
- Notable entrants: Scuderia Ferrari Marlboro (1-7, 12-18); Scuderia Ferrari (8-11)
- Notable drivers: 1. (Germany) Michael Schumacher; 2. (Brazil) Rubens Barrichello
- Debut: 2004 Australian Grand Prix
- First win: 2004 Australian Grand Prix
- Last win: 2004 Japanese Grand Prix
- Last event: 2005 Malaysian Grand Prix
Races	Wins	Podiums	Poles	F/Laps
20	15	30	12	14
- Constructors' Championships: 1 (2004)
- Drivers' Championships: 1 (2004, Michael Schumacher)

The Ferrari F2004 is a highly successful Formula One racing car that was used by Scuderia Ferrari for the 2004 Formula One season. The chassis was designed by Rory Byrne, Ignazio Lunetta, Aldo Costa, Marco Fainello, John Iley, and James Allison, with Ross Brawn playing a vital role in leading the production of the car as the team's Technical Director, and Paolo Martinelli assisted by Giles Simon (engine design and development) and Mattia Binotto (engine operations).

Heavily based on the previous season's F2003-GA, the F2004 continued the run of success the team had enjoyed since the 1999 Formula One season, winning the team's sixth straight Constructors' Championship and fifth straight Drivers' Championship for Michael Schumacher, his seventh and final world drivers' title in 2004. The 50th Formula One car built by Ferrari, it is one of the most dominant cars in the history of Formula One. The F2004 also brought a close to Ferrari's and Schumacher's five-year domination of the sport, leaving the door open for Renault and Fernando Alonso.

== Design ==
The car was based on the same design principles pioneered in the F2002 but taken a step further. The periscope exhausts were smaller and mounted closer to the car's centre line, the rear wing was enlarged and the rear suspension redesigned to reduce tyre wear, a major problem in the F2003-GA, of which the F2004 was based and revised. The engine was designed to last a full weekend in accordance with the FIA's technical regulations for the season. As a result, the gearbox also had to be redesigned to be more resilient. The rear end aerodynamics were improved and the car featured a shorter wheelbase. Launch control and fully-automatic gearboxes were also banned for 2004, meaning the driver had to start using the paddle-shifters, and find the effective bite point and release the clutch manually again. These electronic driver aids had been used by the team for the previous three seasons, starting from the 2001 Spanish Grand Prix. The F2004 debuted with a 1–2 at the 2004 Australian Grand Prix.

== Performance ==
The F2004 was first unveiled on 26 January 2004. On 30 January, the team led by Jean Todt could not believe the results of its test at Fiorano, where Schumacher drove 115 laps and set a record time of 56 seconds. Todt reportedly told Brawn to tell him what was going on because the car was so fast, to which Brawn replied that Todt did not have to worry because it was fully compliant with the regulations. The car was as successful as the equally dominant F2002, winning 15 out of 18 races and scoring 12 pole positions including many lap records. Schumacher won 13 races (including 7 in a row), setting a single-season record (Sebastian Vettel equalled this number with the Red Bull RB9 in 2013), which lasted until 2022 when Max Verstappen won 15 races with the Red Bull RB18, and gained a record breaking seventh World Championship (since equalled by Lewis Hamilton in 2020), while Ferrari was a clear winner in the Constructors' Championship. The F2004 was also extremely reliable, retiring from just two races and both of these were via collisions. Schumacher notably won the 2004 French Grand Prix by beating Alonso's Renault R24B after an innovative four stop pit strategy.

After the 2004 season, the car was developed further as a testbed for 2005. A revised version, the F2004M, was used in the first two races. Despite a podium finish in the 2005 Australian Grand Prix, the car was retired to make way for its successor, the F2005, at the 2005 Bahrain Grand Prix. Although Byrne expressed his belief that the F2005 would surpass the F2004 and be the "best ever Ferrari Formula One car", praising Costa, who succeeded him as overseer of design and development, it proved to be a disappointing season, with only a win at the controversial 2005 United States Grand Prix. This was in large part because the FIA, in an attempt to end Ferrari's dominance and provide more competition after the dominant season with the F2004, mandated a rule change banning pit stops and requiring Formula One tyres to last a full race. In all, the F2004 scored 272 championship points in its career (also including the 10 points achieved in the first two races of 2005). Its championship in 2004 marked the end of Ferrari's Constructors' Championship winning streak that began in 1999; this would not be repeated until Mercedes' run in the 2010s and 2020s, when Mercedes equalled and later broke this and other records first set by the F2004. The F2004 was used as the basis for the 2008 "Powered by Ferrari" A1 Grand Prix car.

== Sponsorship and livery ==
The livery was similar to the previous season with numerous retained sponsors including Vodafone and Olympus Corporation. Ferrari used the Marlboro logos, except at the Canadian, French, British, and United States Grands Prix due to anti-tobacco legislation. At the 2004 Belgium Grand Prix, where Schumacher won the Drivers' title, Ferrari celebrated their 700th Grand Prix and their cars carried a logo celebrating the achievement behind the seat and sidepods; their 700th Grand Prix was officially held two weeks later at Italian Grand Prix.

== Legacy ==
Michael Schumacher driving the F2004 at the 2004 Monaco Grand Prix

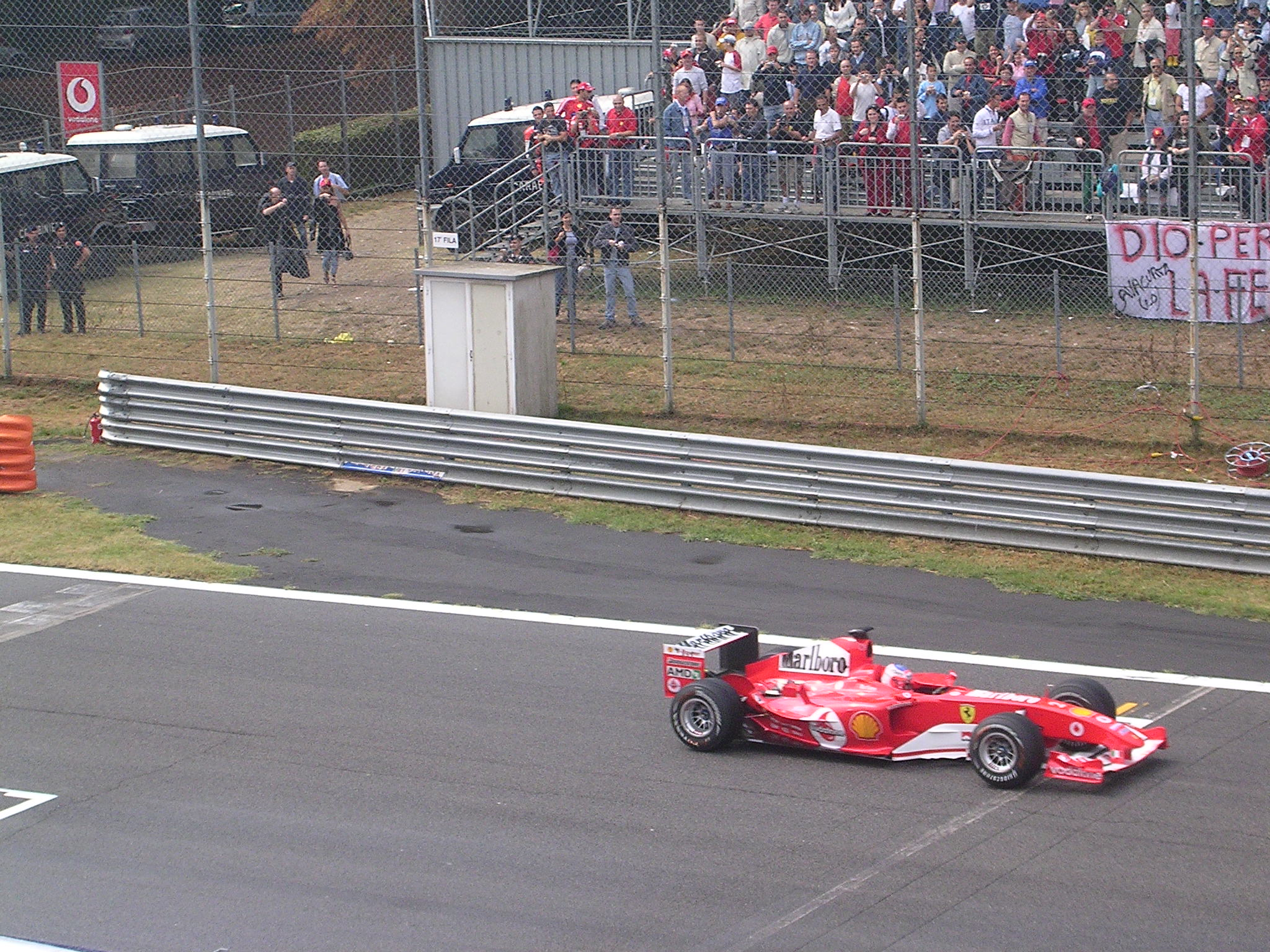
Rubens Barrichello's in F2004 driving at Monza Circuit and winner of the 2004 Italian Grand Prix

The F2004 proved to be one of the most dominant and outright fastest cars in Formula One history. In 2014, at the dawn of the turbo-hybrid era, motorsports journalist and Autosport columnist Dieter Rencken cited the F2004 as "the fastest car in F1 history". The F2004 set many new lap records on different type of tracks, including Albert Park, Nürburgring, Gilles Villeneuve, Magny-Cours, Hungaroring, Monza, and Shanghai, and kept the fastest race laps of Albert Park, Monza, and Shanghai even through the 2019 and 2020 seasons.

As of 2025, the fastest race laps set by the F2004 at the old Albert Park version, Magny-Cours, and Shanghai remain the lap records, and Monza's fastest qualifying and race laps were only beaten by the Mercedes W11 in 2020 and by the McLaren MCL39 in 2025, showing the competitiveness of the F2004 against modern cars some twenty years younger. Schumacher's son Mick drove the car at the 2019 German Grand Prix, honouring 15 years since his father's final world championship. He also drove the car around the track before the start of the 2020 Tuscan Grand Prix to celebrate Ferrari's 1000th Grand Prix.

== Other ==
The F2004 was featured in Formula One 04, the official Formula One video game, after Sony Computer Entertainment acquired the exclusive licence, which it had previously shared with Electronic Arts. Alongside the F2007, it was featured in the F1 2017, F1 2018, F1 2019, and F1 2020 games developed under exclusive licence by Codemasters. The F2004 was also featured in Assetto Corsa as part of the Ferrari 70th Anniversary Pack. In 2026, the F2004 was featured by Lego in a set including a minifigure of Schumacher.

== Complete Formula One results ==
(key) (results in bold indicate pole position, results in italics indicate fastest lap)

Year	Entrant	Chassis	Engine	Tyres	Drivers	1	2	3	4	5	6	7	8	9	10	11	12	13	14	15	16	17	18	19	Points	WCC
2004	Scuderia Ferrari Marlboro	F2004	Ferrari V10	B		AUS	MAL	BHR	SMR	ESP	MON	EUR	CAN	USA	FRA	GBR	GER	HUN	BEL	ITA	CHN	JPN	BRA		**262**	1st
2004	Scuderia Ferrari Marlboro	F2004	Ferrari V10	B	Michael Schumacher	**1**	**1**	**1**	1	**1**	Ret	**1**	1	1	1	1	**1**	**1**	2	2	12	**1**	7		**262**	1st
2004	Scuderia Ferrari Marlboro	F2004	Ferrari V10	B	Rubens Barrichello	2	4	2	6	2	3	2	2	**2**	3	3	12	2	3	**1**	**1**	Ret	**3**		**262**	1st
2005	Scuderia Ferrari Marlboro	F2004M	Ferrari V10	B		AUS	MAL	BHR	SMR	ESP	MON	EUR	CAN	USA	FRA	GBR	GER	HUN	TUR	ITA	BEL	BRA	JPN	CHN	**100***	3rd
2005	Scuderia Ferrari Marlboro	F2004M	Ferrari V10	B	Michael Schumacher	Ret	7																		**100***	3rd
2005	Scuderia Ferrari Marlboro	F2004M	Ferrari V10	B	Rubens Barrichello	2	Ret																		**100***	3rd

* 10 points scored with the F2004M

== Influence ==
=== A1GP Powered by Ferrari car ===
A1GP Powered by Ferrari car
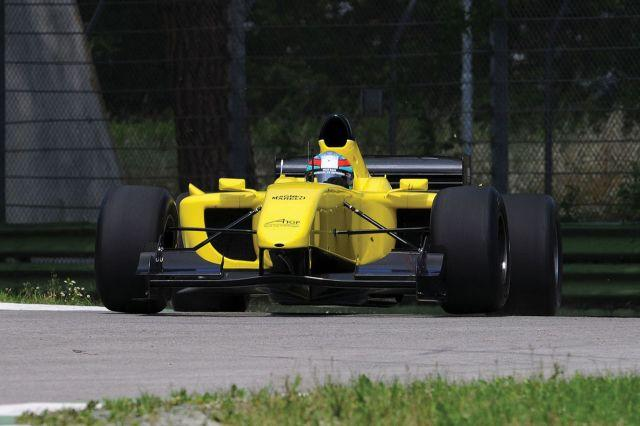
- A1 GP powered by Ferrari race car
- Category: A1 Grand Prix
- Constructor: Ferrari
- Predecessor: A1 Grand Prix car
- Successor: None

Technical specifications
- Chassis: Carbon-fibre monocoque with honeycomb structure
- Suspension (front): Double wishbone with pushrod operated coil-over damper units
- Suspension (rear): Double wishbone with pushrod operated coil-over damper units
- Length: 569 mm (22.4 in)
- Width: 666.5 mm (26.24 in)
- Height: 446 mm (17.6 in)
- Engine: Ferrari F136 4.5 L (275 cu in) V8 (90°) naturally-aspirated
- Torque: 406 lb⋅ft (550 N⋅m)
- Transmission: Magneti Marelli 6-speed sequential semi-automatic paddle-shift
- Power: 540 bhp (400 kW) (in race mode); 600–650 bhp (450–480 kW) (in PowerBoost mode)
- Weight: 700 kg (1,500 lb)
- Fuel: Shell E10 102 RON
- Brakes: Brembo
- Tyres: Michelin
- Clutch: AP three-plate carbon/carbon with steel hub

Competition history
- Notable entrants: All A1 teams
- Notable drivers: All A1 drivers
- Debut: 2008–09 A1GP Netherlands
- Last event: 2008–09 A1GP Britain

The A1GP Powered by Ferrari car is a vehicle designed by John Travis to compete in the A1 Grand Prix. The chassis is a bespoke design but with styling and aerodynamics based on the F2004 chassis. It is made from carbon-fibre skins with an aluminium honeycomb core, and has been tested to meet all FIA crash safety standards. Only 23 cars were ever made, and they reside in the United States with A1GP Collection. On 11 October 2007, A1GP and Ferrari announced a six-year collaboration on the new generation of A1GP cars. The new "Powered by Ferrari" car had a brand new bespoke chassis designed by John Travis, but with styling inspired by the F2004, powered by a Ferrari F136 F V8 engine producing 650 bhp.

The car was officially revealed in Southern England, and driven for the first time by John Watson in an inaugural event in May 2008. Michelin supplied the tyres for the new car. The car was developed and tested over more than 5,600 km (3,500 mi) at Mugello Circuit, Fiorano Circuit, Autodromo Enzo e Dino Ferrari, Circuito Guadix, Silverstone Circuit, Donington Park, Circuit Paul Ricard, and Circuit de Nevers Magny-Cours. Andrea Bertolini was the main test driver, but testing was carried out by Marc Gené, Patrick Friesacher, Jonny Kane, and Danny Watts during the sessions at Silverstone.

On 22 July 2008, information regarding the then-new "Powered by Ferrari" A1GP car was revealed. On 2–3 August 2008, the first press and public presentation of this car was held on the TT Circuit Assen with former A1 Team Netherlands driver Renger van der Zande. Two weeks later, the car was presented in Rotterdam during the Bavaria City Racing Festival. The A1 Team Netherlands car was driven by Carlo van Dam.

Pre-season tests of the new "Powered by Ferrari" car took place on consecutive weekends in September at Donington Park, Mugello, and Snetterton. It was only used for the 2008–2009 season as the series was cancelled for the next season. Each car is equipped with a unique PowerBoost system, a mechanism to provide short bursts of increased power to create additional overtaking opportunities and action throughout the race. By changing the engine's parameters, the system can give the driver additional power over a limited time during each race to take the car from the base 540 bhp (400 kW) to its maximum power of 600 bhp (450 kW). The PowerBoost is driver-activated by a button mounted on the steering wheel. While the number of PowerBoost uses remain unchanged from Zytek era (4 times in Sprint races and 8 times in Feature races), a new rule for the season allowed drivers to use it for the entirety of a single lap during qualifying sessions.

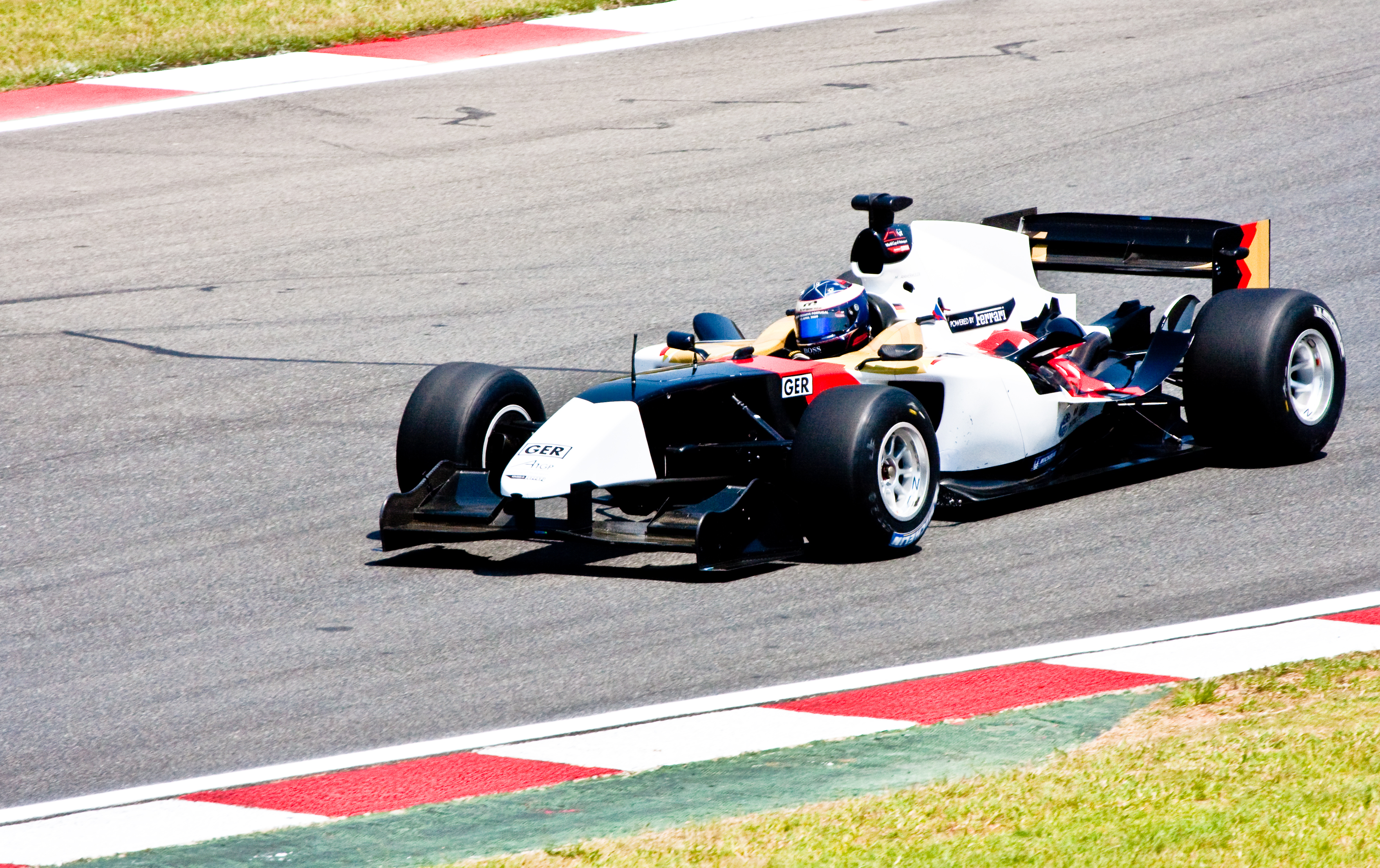
Team Germany car

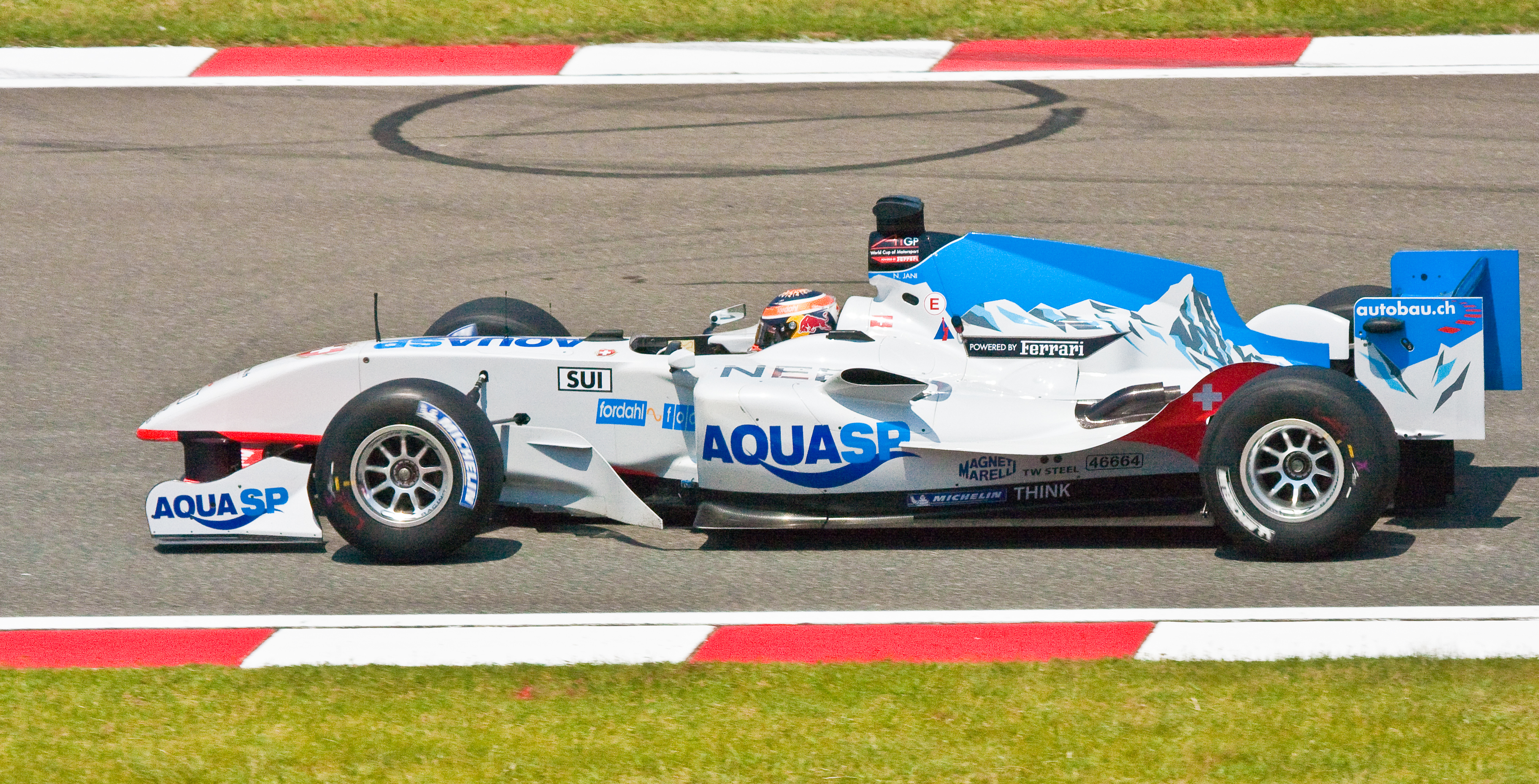
Team Switzerland car

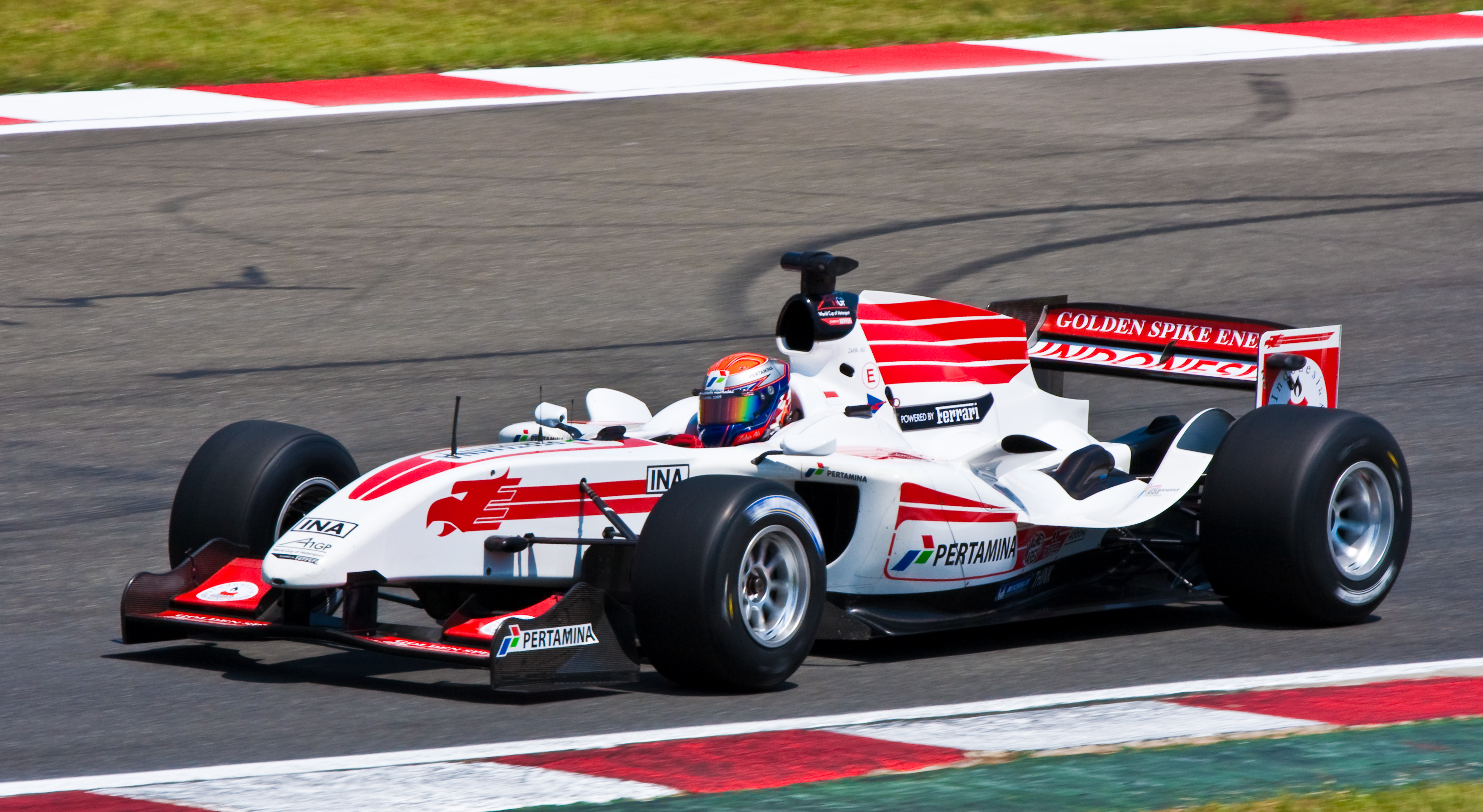
Team Indonesia car

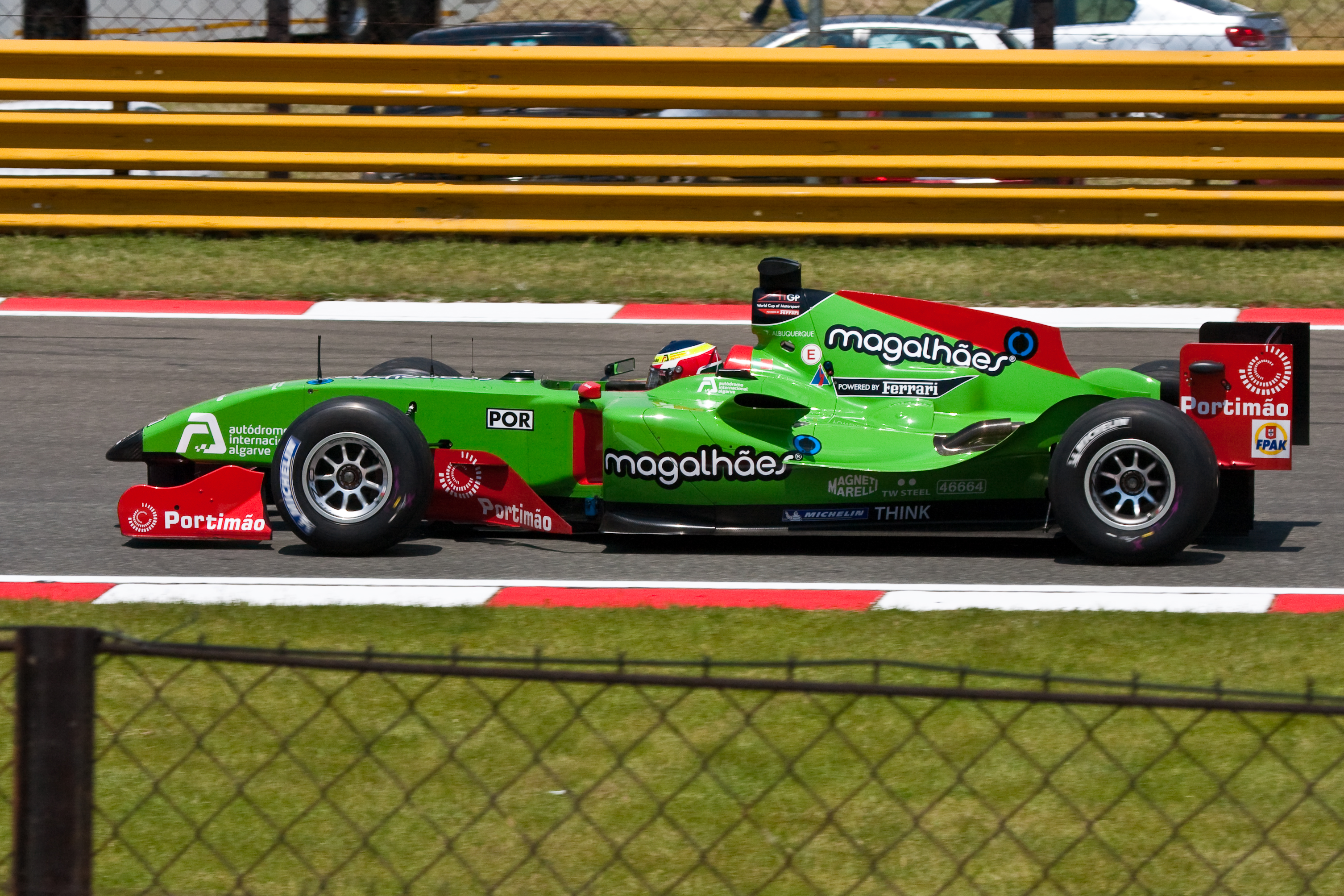
Team Portugal car

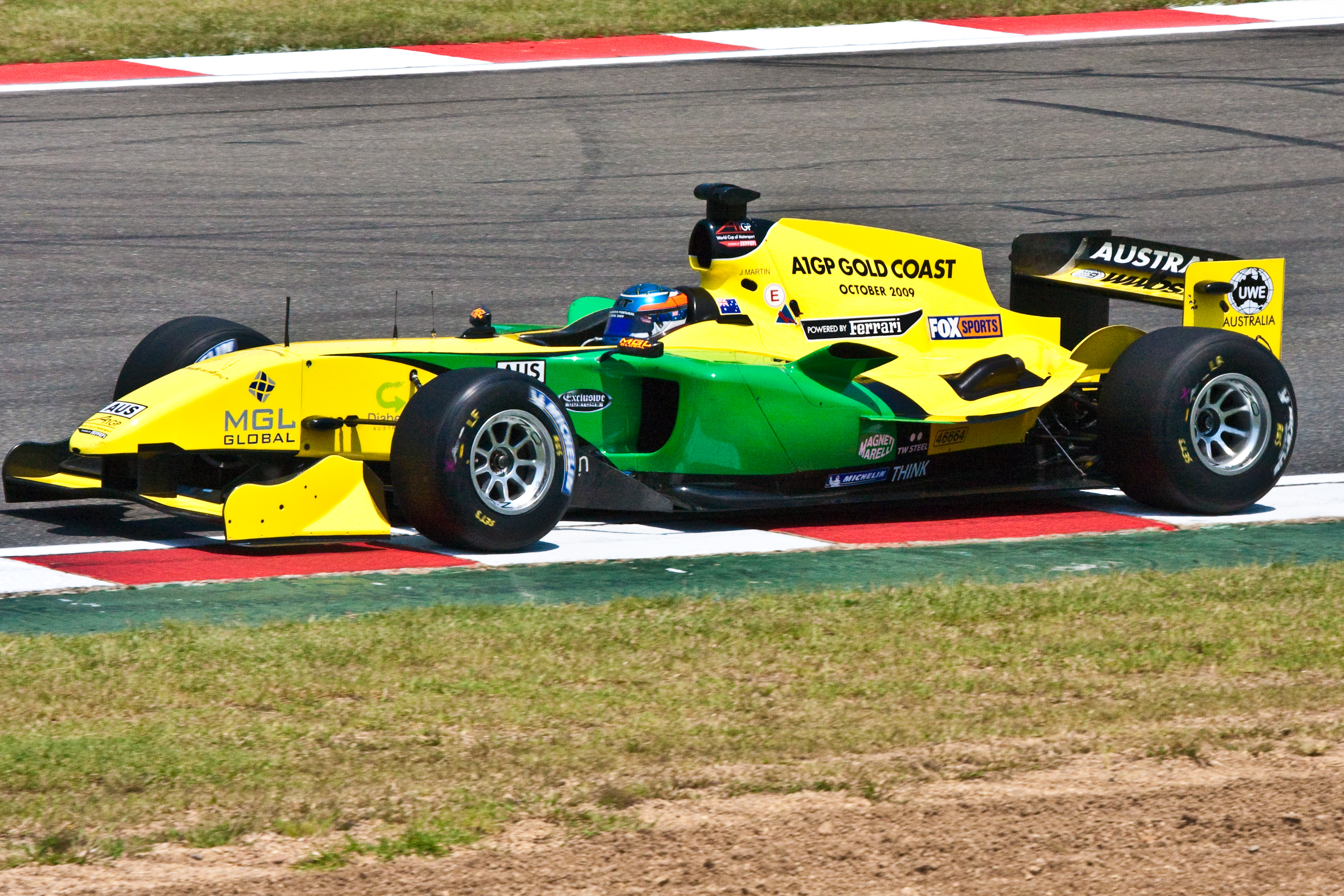
Team Australia car

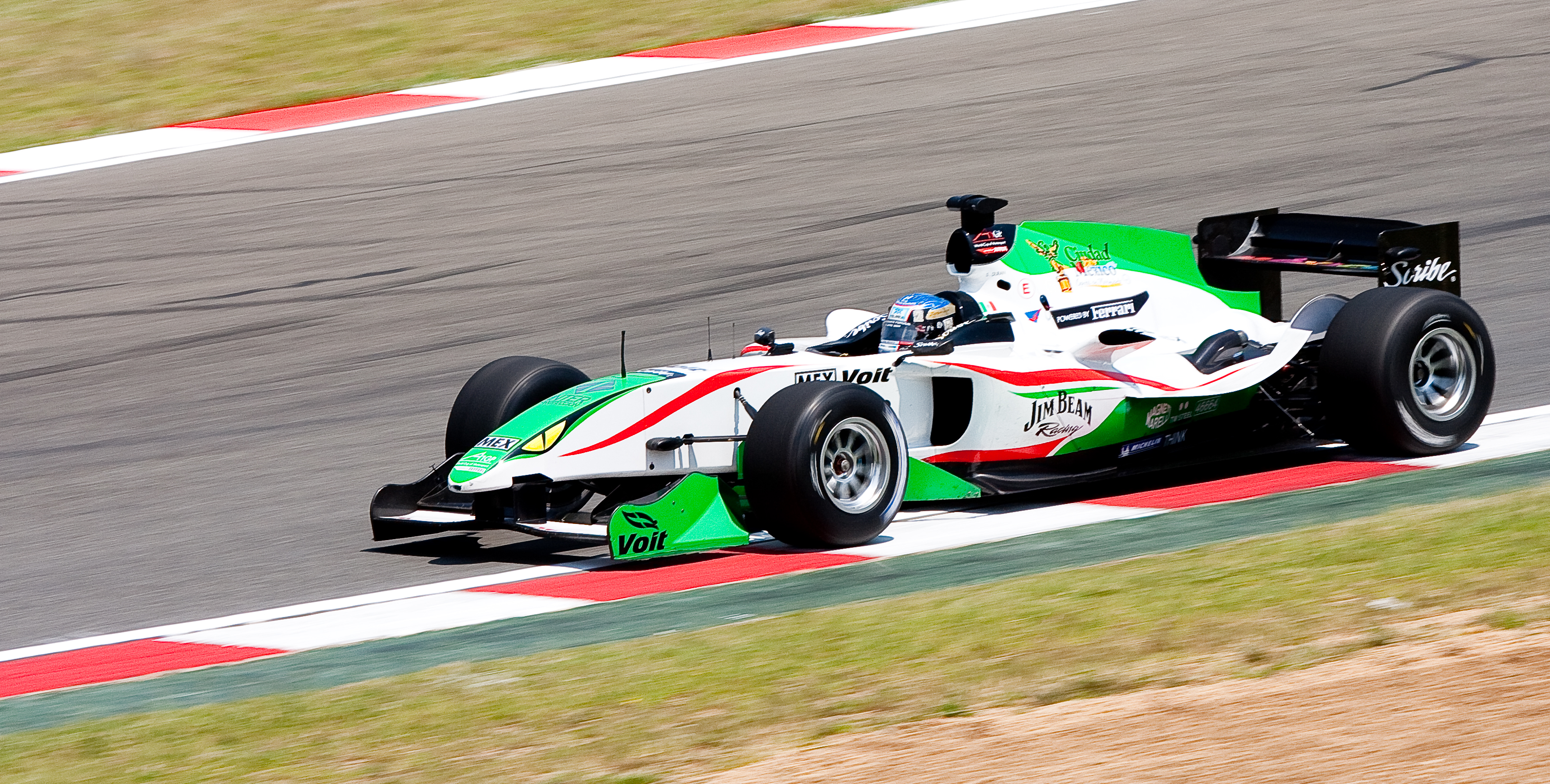
Team Mexico car

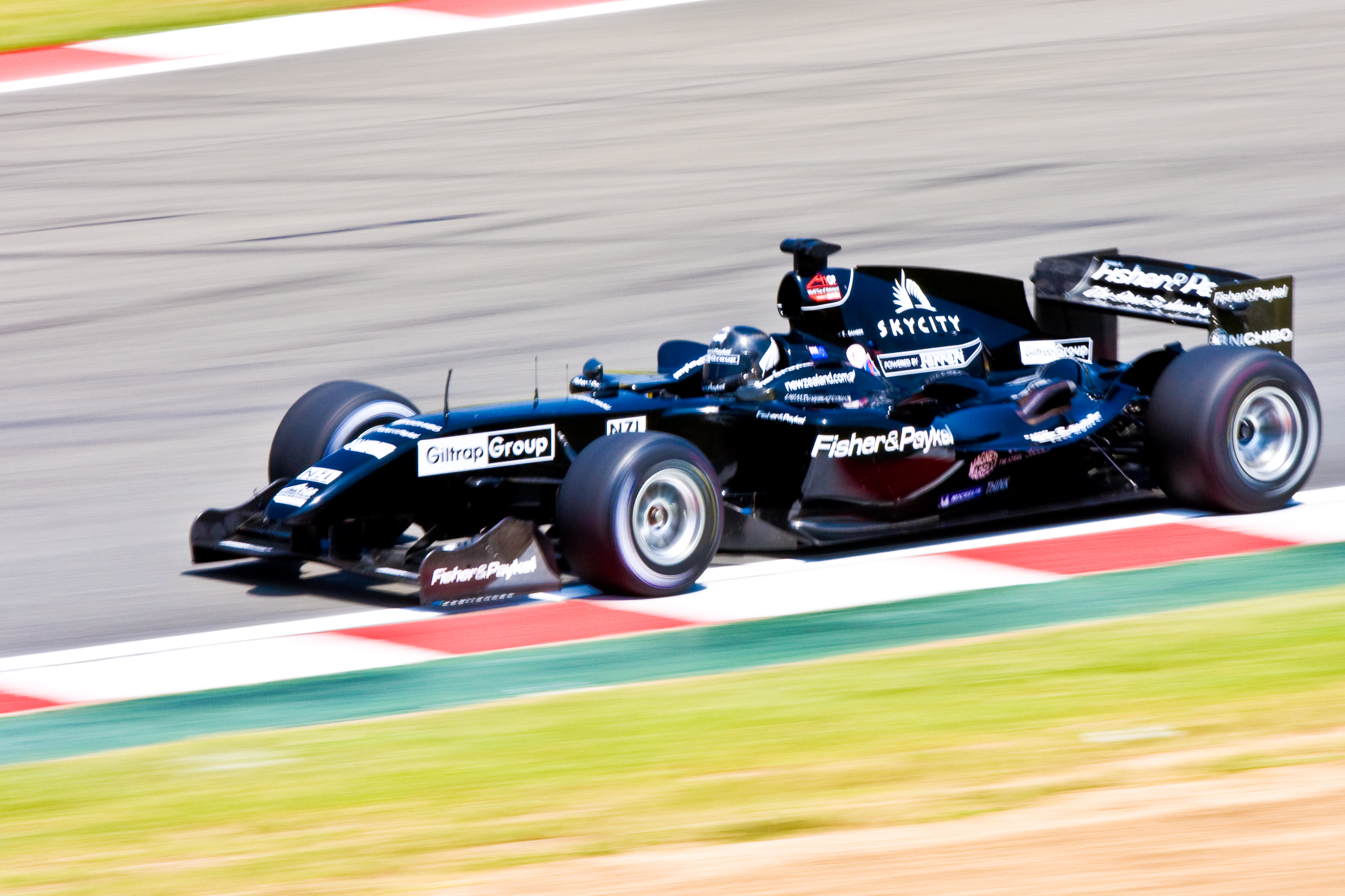
Team New Zealand car

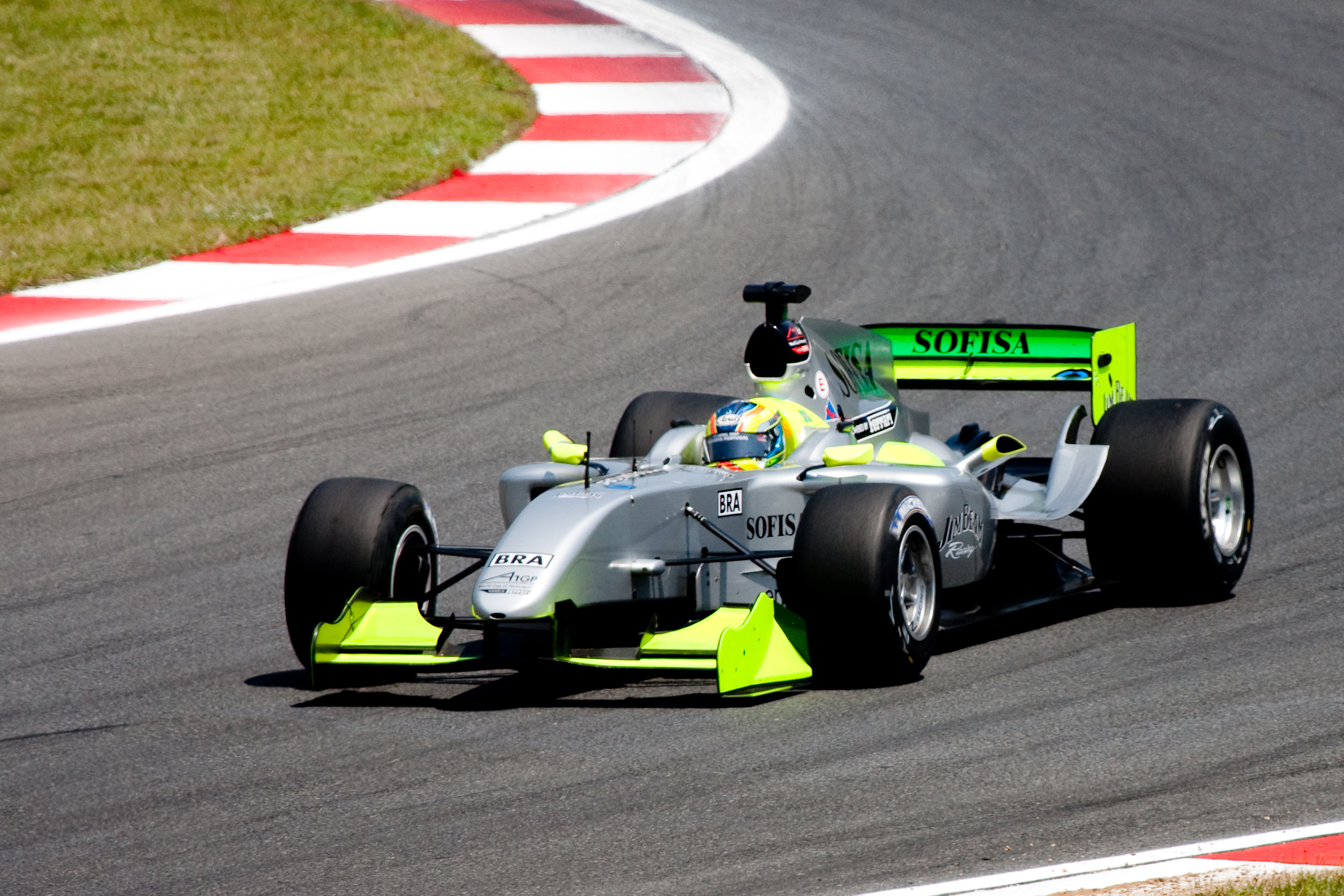
Team Brazil car

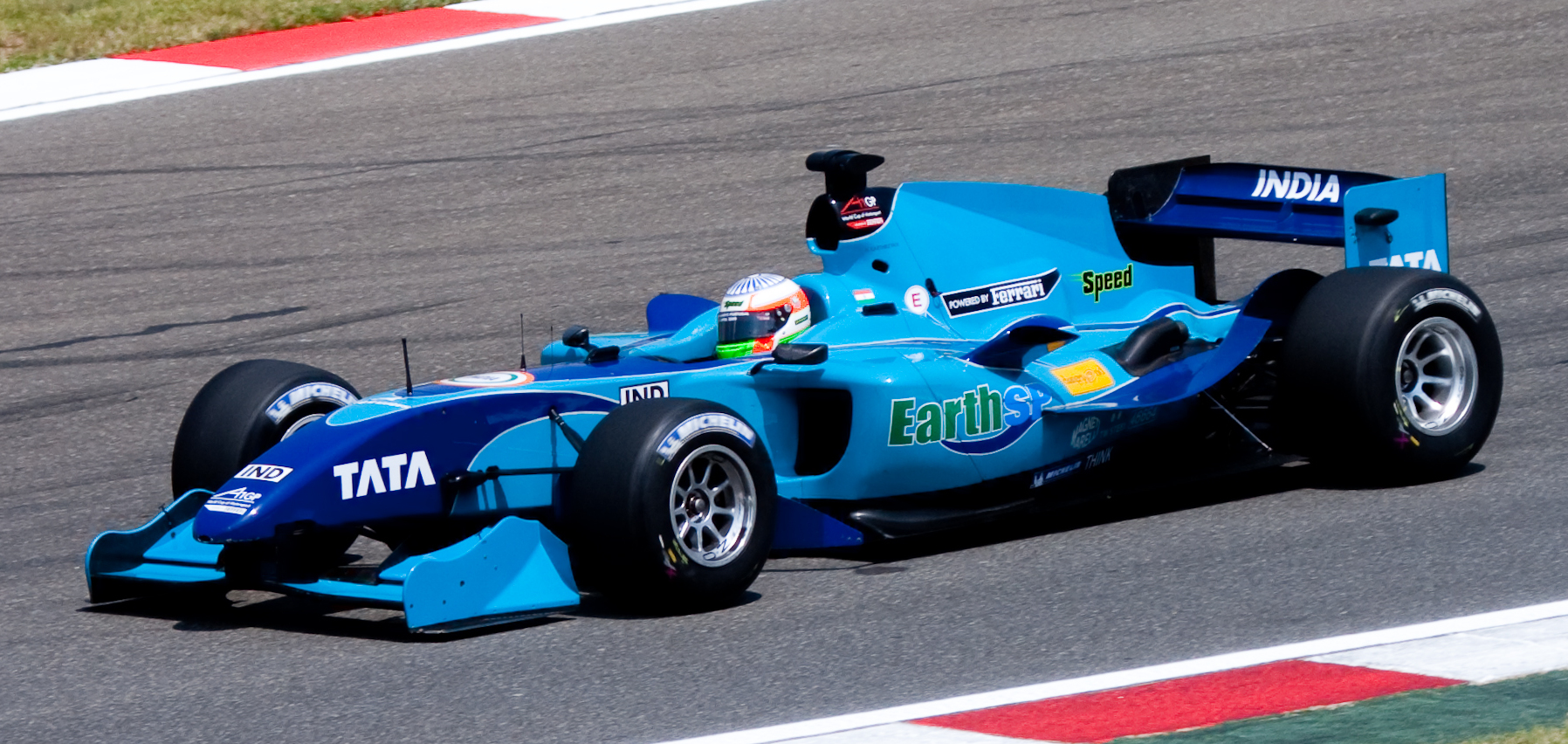
Team India car

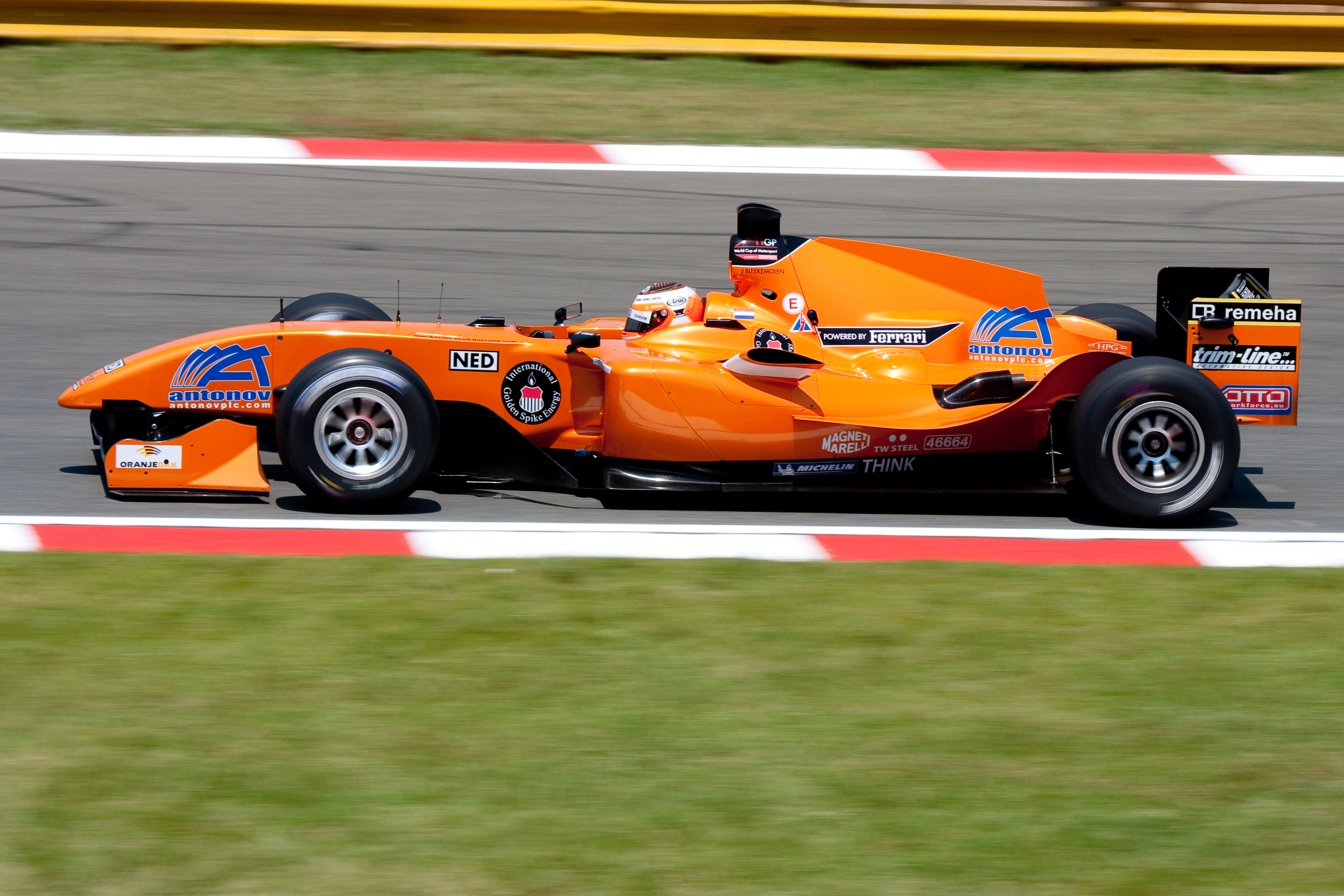
Team The Netherlands car

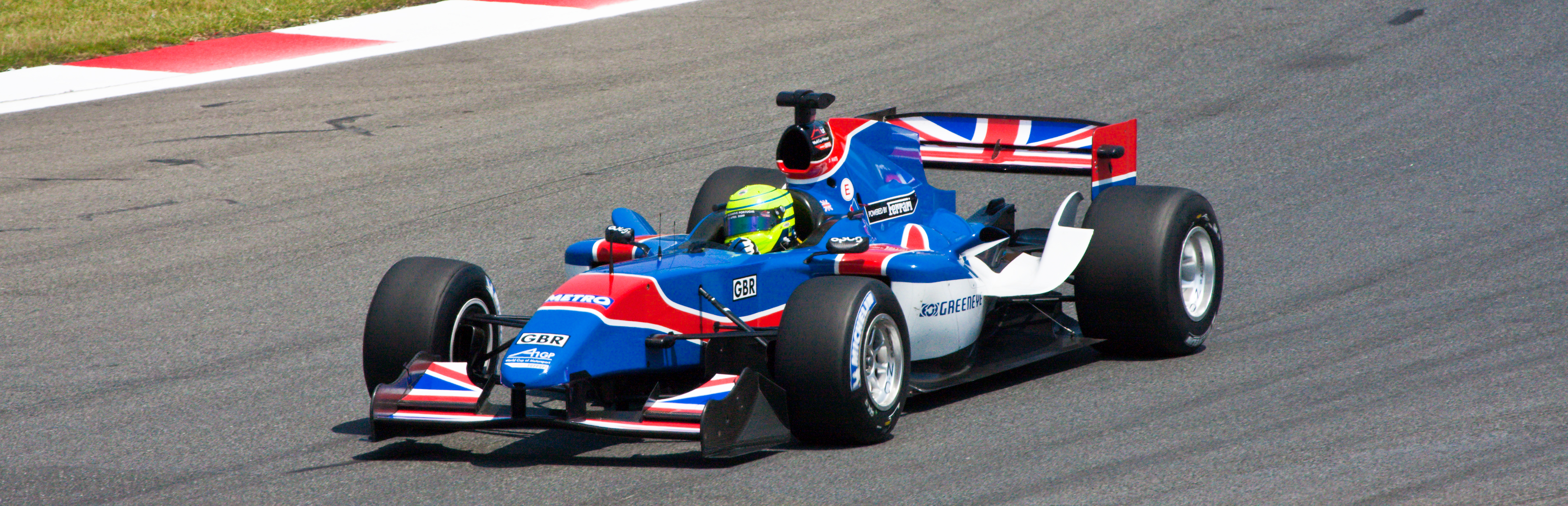
Team Great Britain car

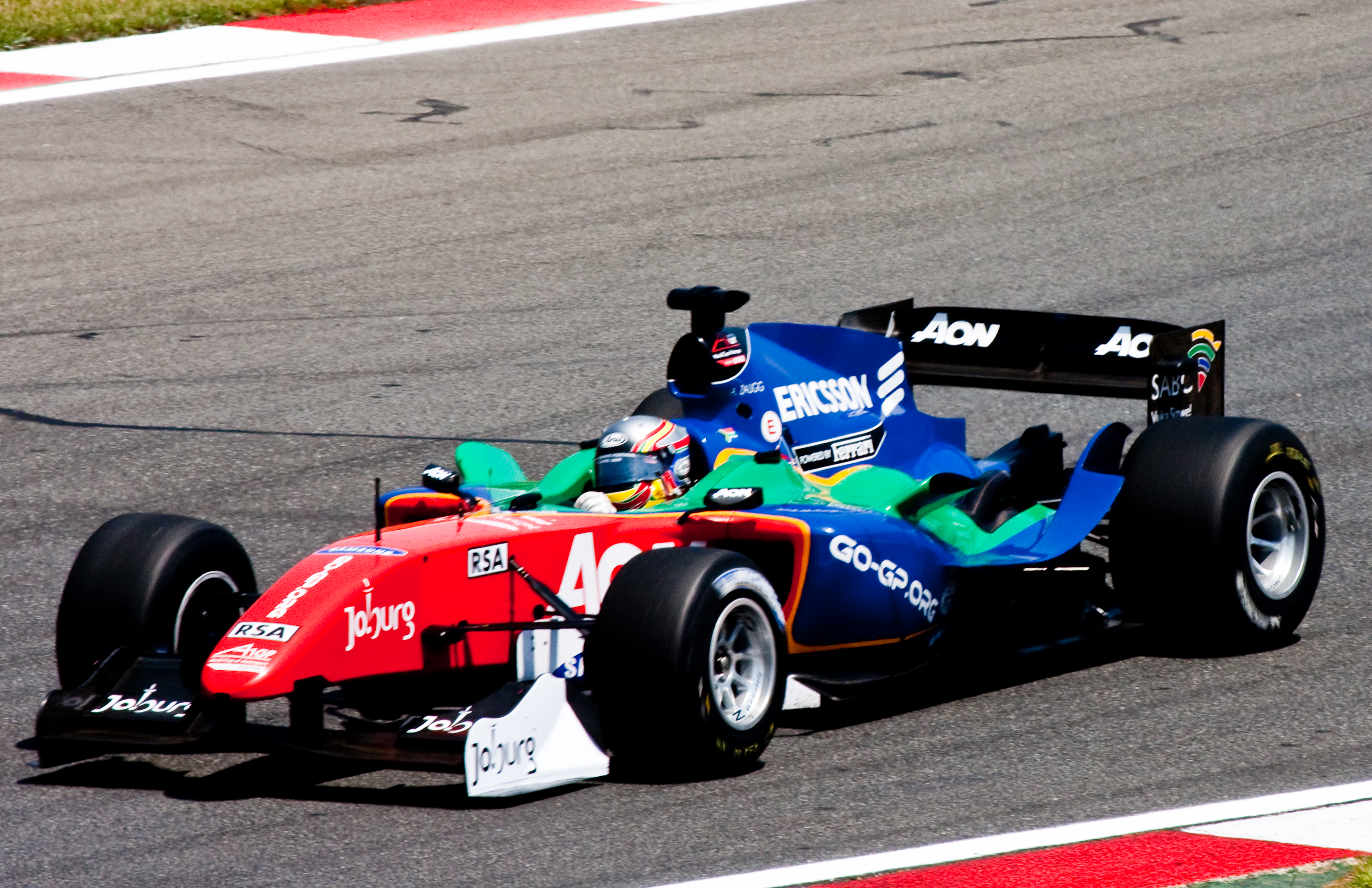
Team South Africa car

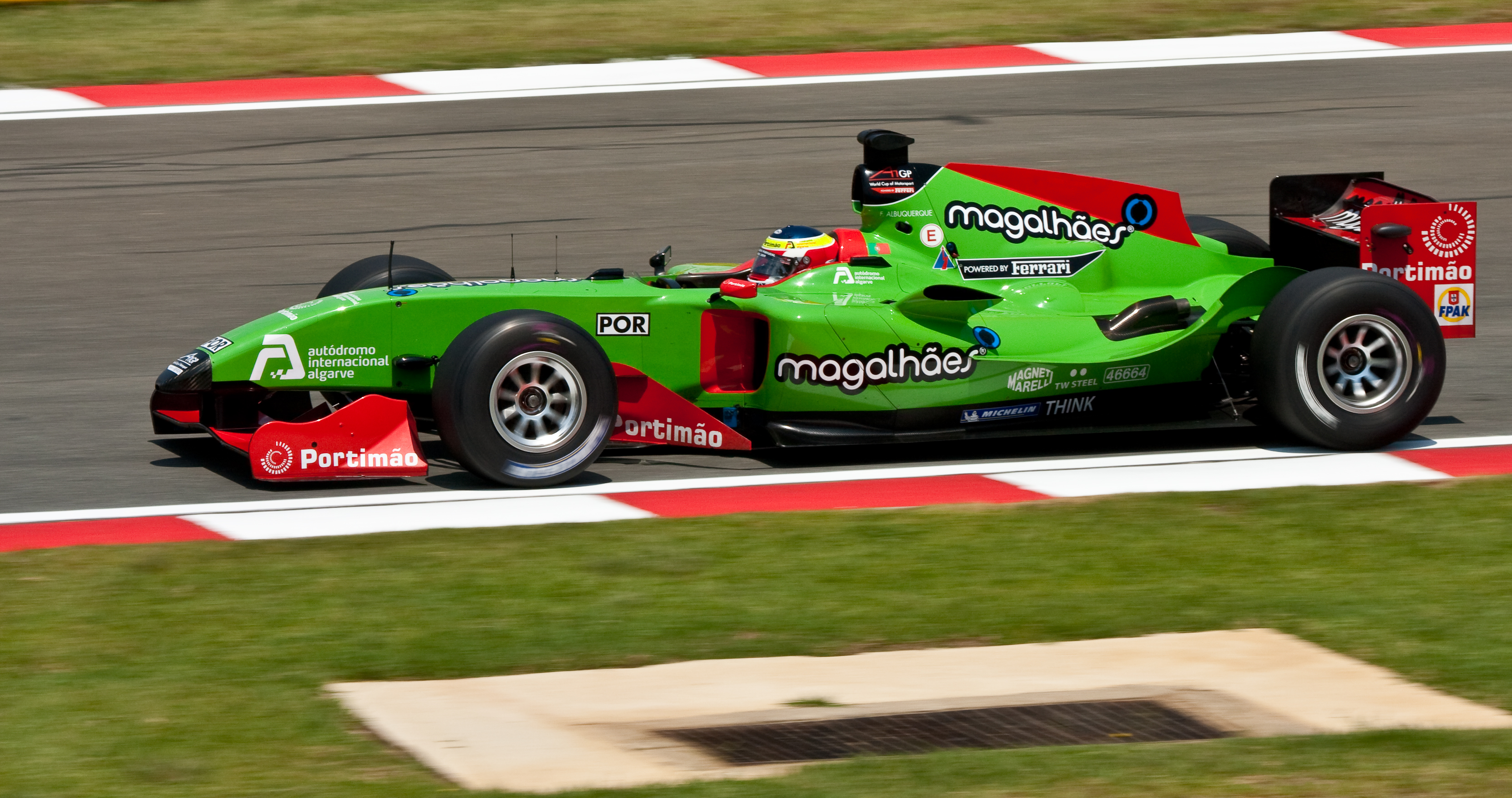
Team Portugal car

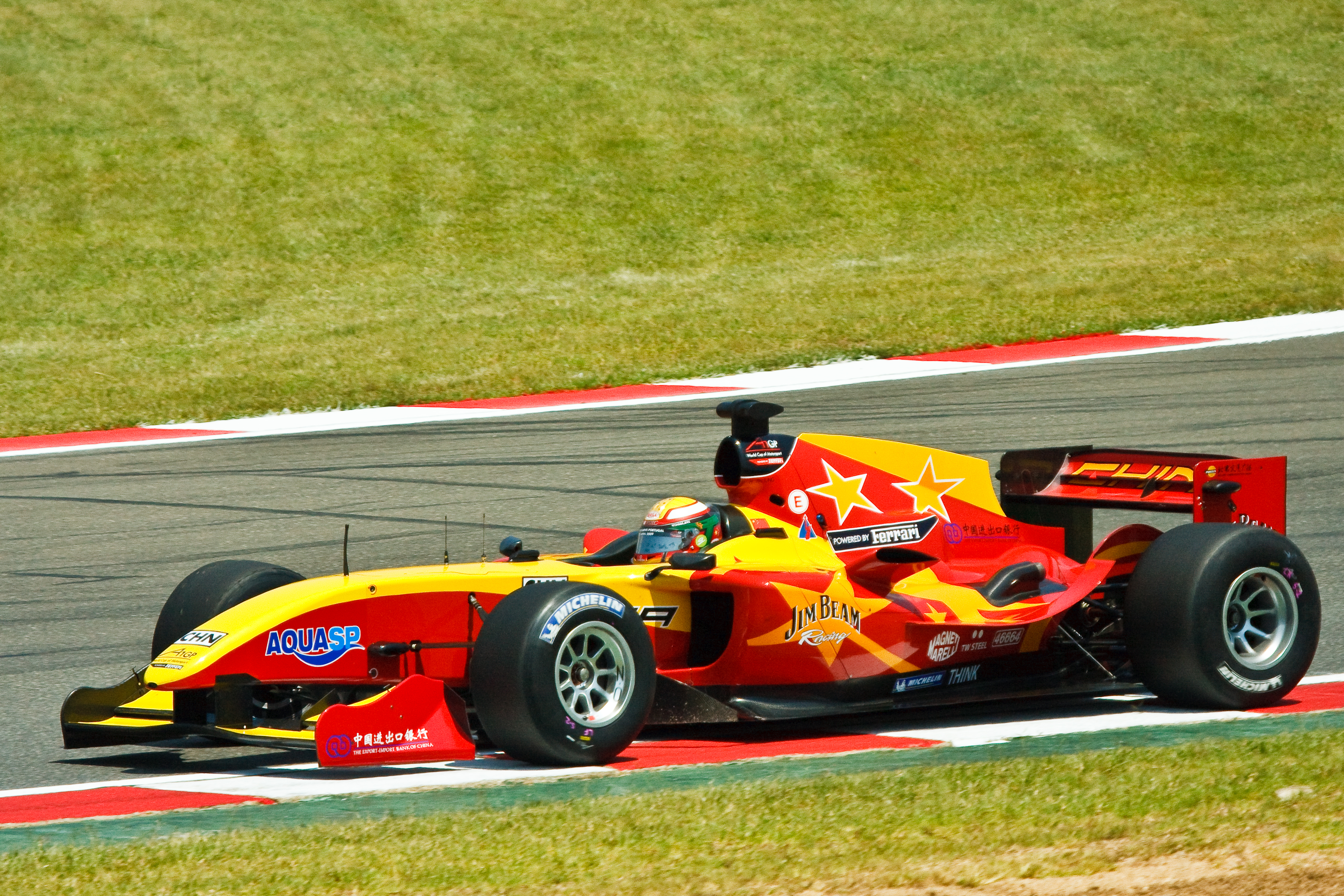
Team China car

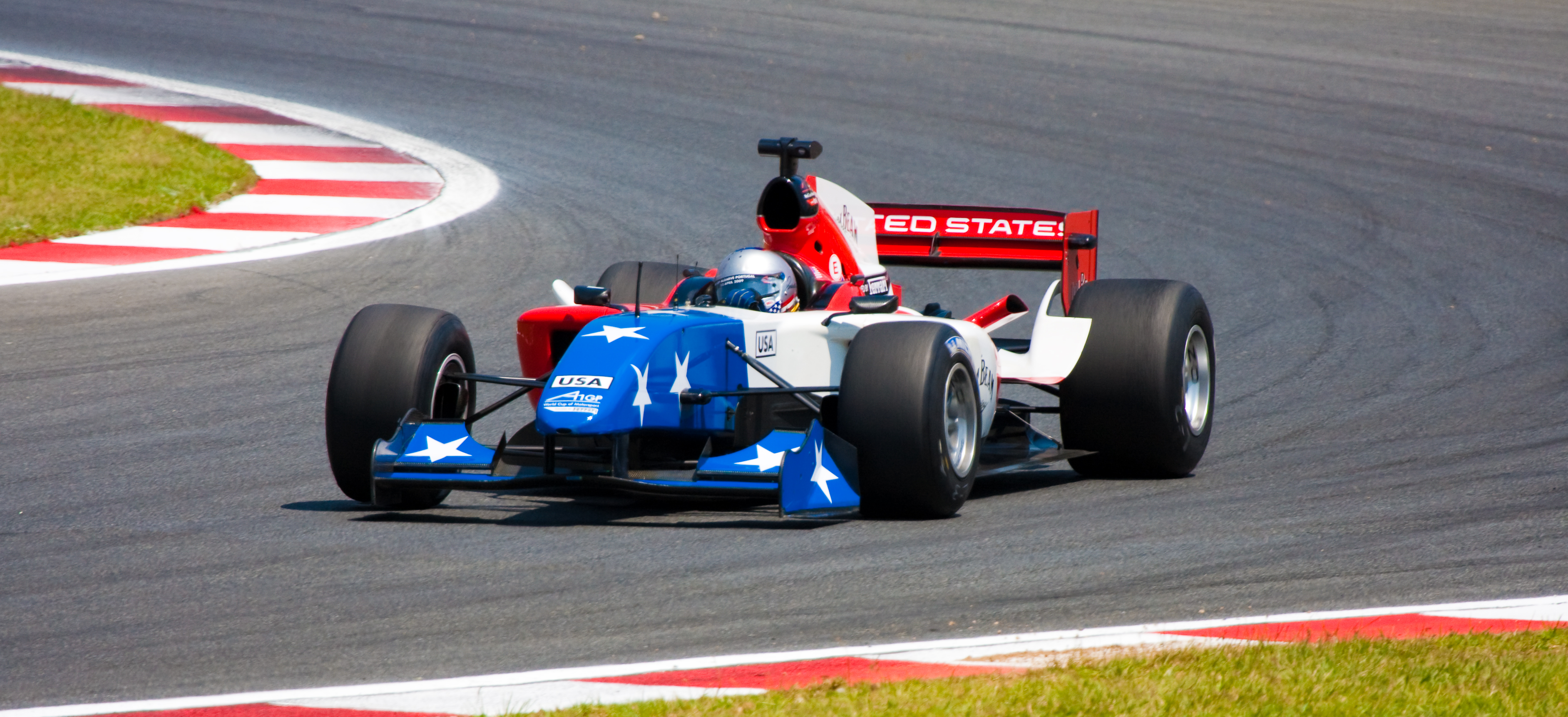
Team United States car

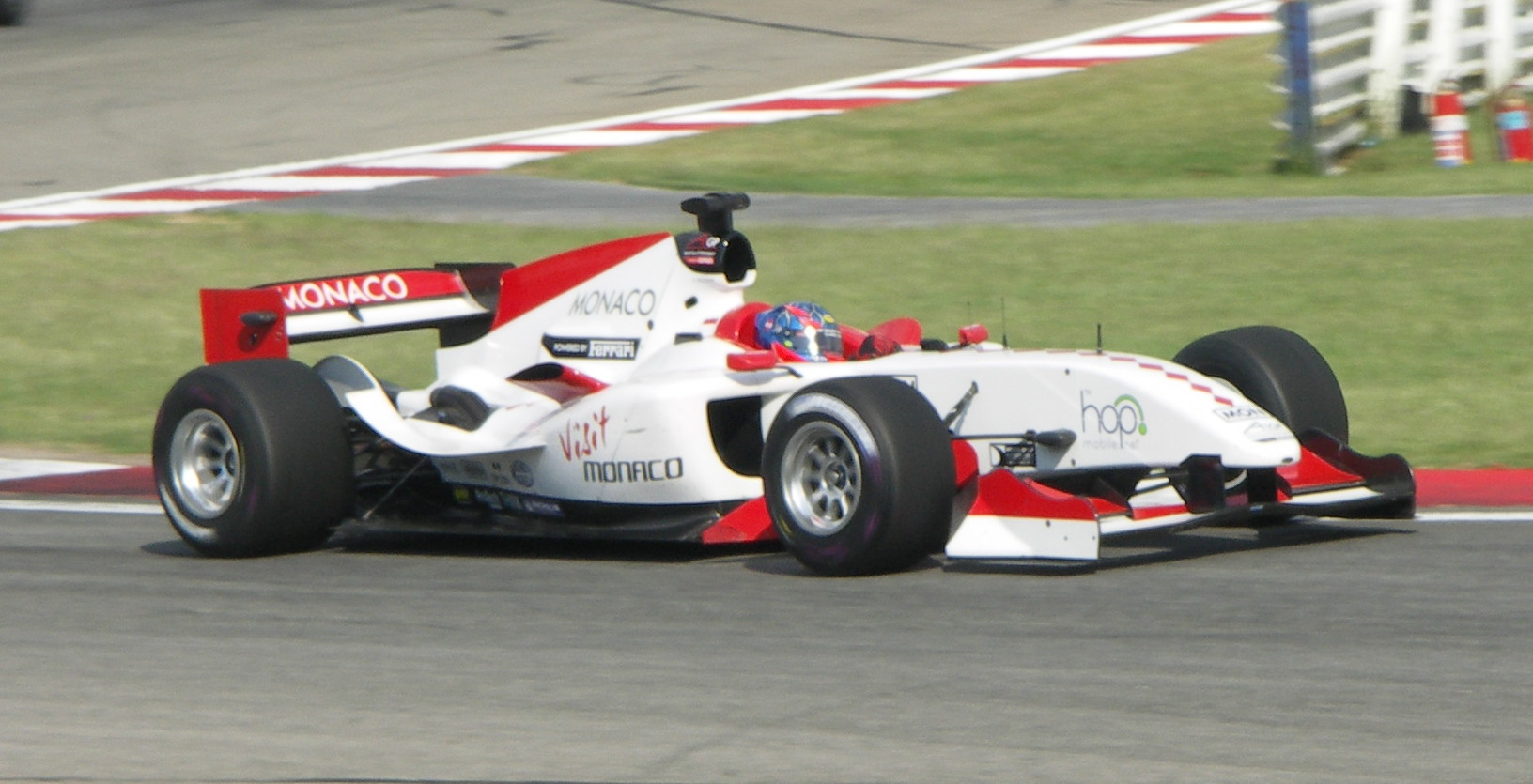
Team Monaco car

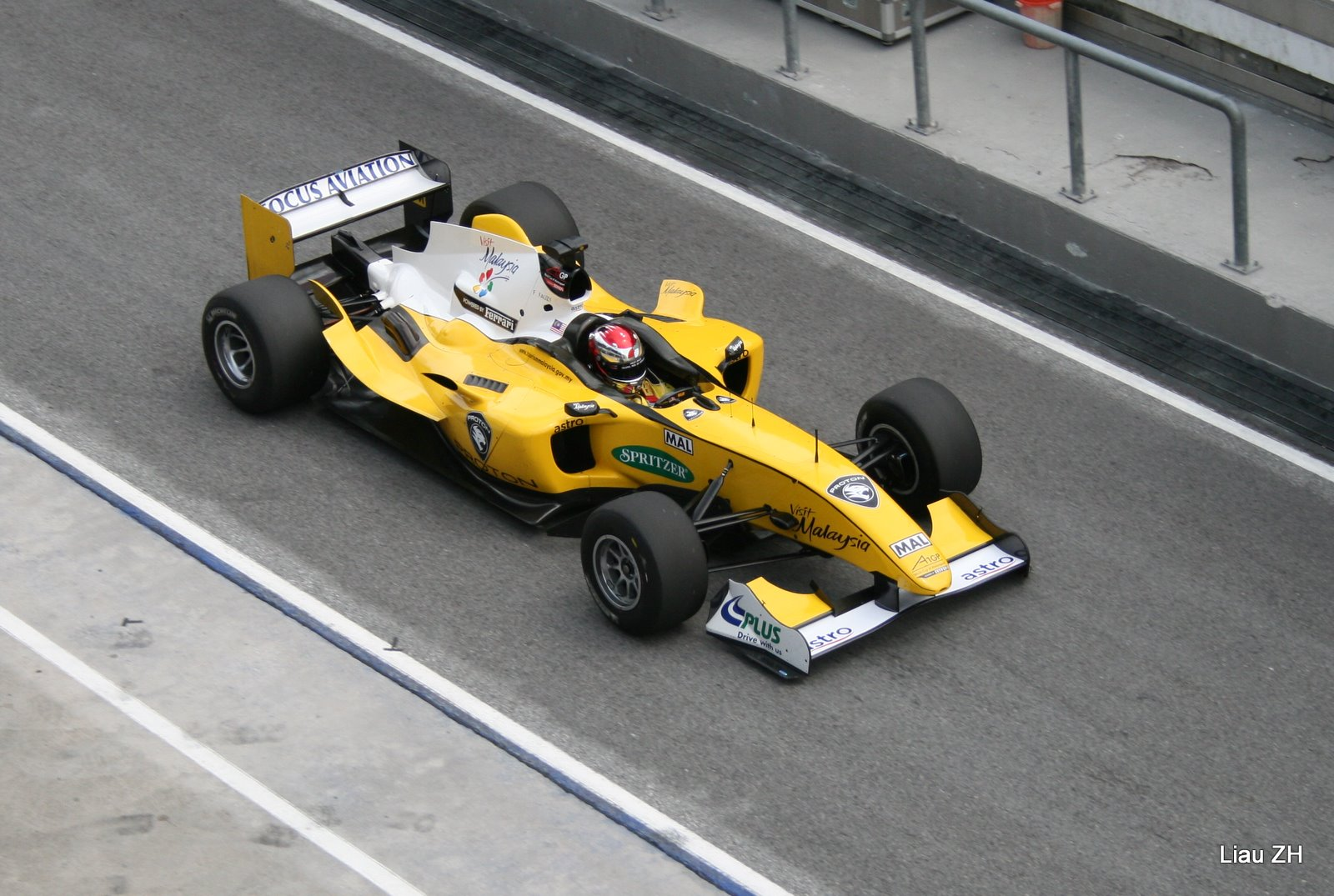
Team Malaysia car

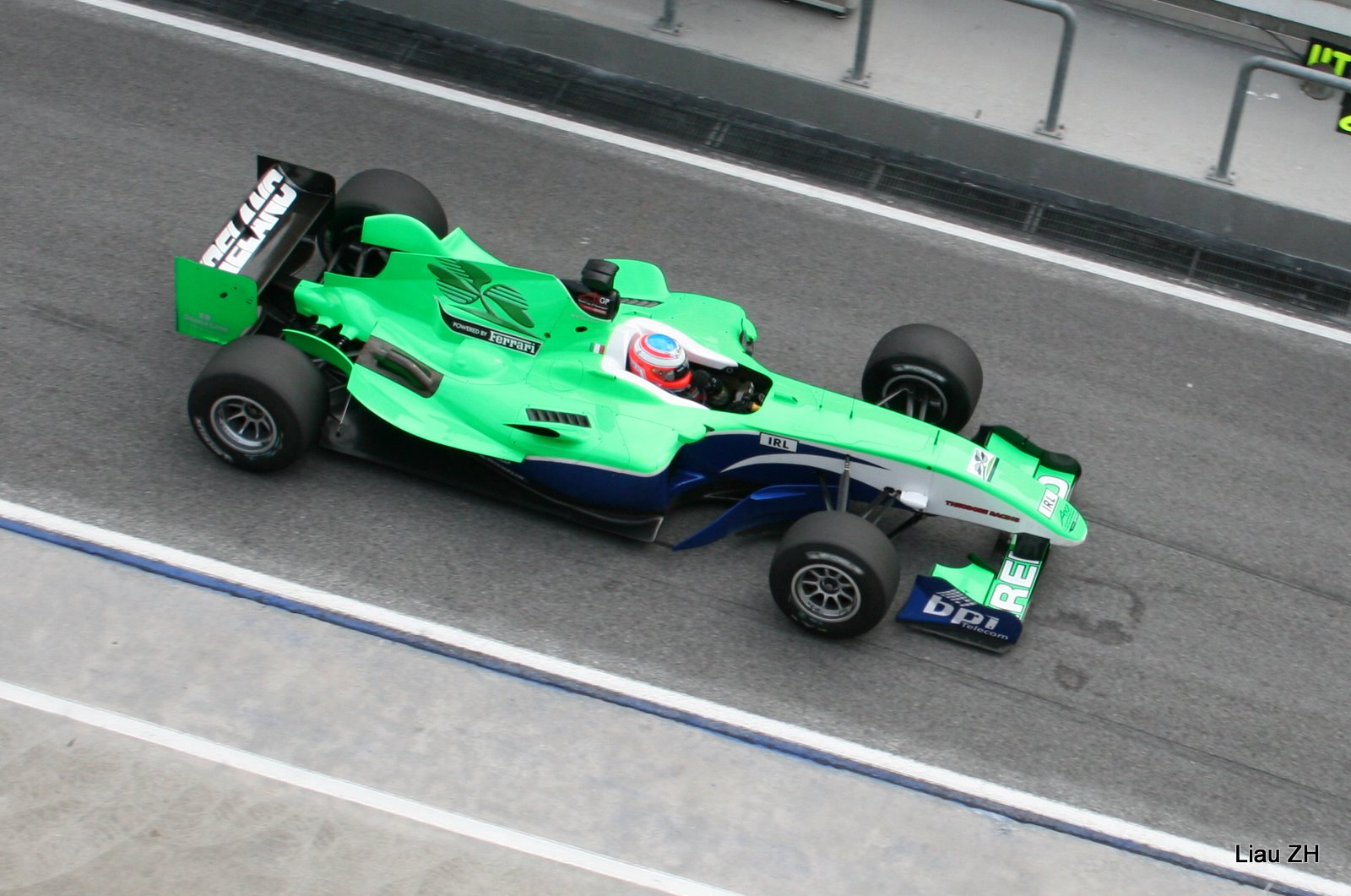
Team Ireland car

Awards
Preceded by Bentley Speed 8	Autosport; Racing Car of the Year; 2004	Succeeded by McLaren MP4-20
