= Ignazio Lunetta =

Italian engineer

- Born: 25 May 1956 (age 69); Caltanissetta, Italy
- Citizenship: Italian
- Occupation: Engineer
- Years active: 1984 - 2005
- Employer(s): Scuderia Ferrari, Osella

Ignazio Lunetta (born 25 May 1956) is a retired Italian Formula One and motorsport engineer, best known for his senior engineering roles with Scuderia Ferrari during the team’s dominant period in the late 1990s and early 2000s.

== Career ==
Lunetta studied mechanical engineering and began his professional career as a racing engineer in Formula 3 and Formula 2 before moving to Formula One in 1984 with the Osella team. At Osella, he worked in engineering roles for four years, eventually becoming Chief Designer and updating chassis designs under significant financial constraints prior to the team’s restructuring. After leaving Osella, Lunetta joined the competition department of Alfa Romeo, where he contributed to sports car and touring car programmes, most notably the Alfa Romeo SE 048SP and the highly successful Alfa Romeo 155 touring car project.

Lunetta joined Scuderia Ferrari in 1992 as Chief Engineer of the test team during a major engineering reorganisation at Maranello. The following year, he was promoted to the race team, where he became race engineer to Jean Alesi. The partnership lasted through Alesi’s tenure at Ferrari, culminating in Alesi’s first and only Grand Prix victory in 1995. In 1996, Lunetta was assigned as race engineer to Michael Schumacher, a position he held until the end of the 1999 season. The pair enjoyed a successful working relationship, coming close to championship success in 1997 and 1998. During Schumacher’s injury absence in 1999, Lunetta worked with Mika Salo before being appointed Head of Track Engineering at Ferrari in 2000. At the end of the 2000 season, Lunetta left the race team to become Head of Ferrari’s research and development department, where he oversaw the performance development of current and future cars and led analysis of data and telemetry during race weekends.

In 2005, Lunetta left Ferrari’s Formula One team and subsequently worked on a collaborative project between Ferrari and the Italian National Olympic Committee, applying Formula One engineering methodologies to winter sports performance. He later retired from professional engineering work.
