= List of Greek photographers =

Notable photographers from Greece

A list of notable photographers from Greece:

- Filippos Margaritis (1839–1892, )
- Leonidas Papazoglou (1872–1918, Λεωνίδας Παπάζογλου)
- Nelly's, Elli Souyioultzoglou-Seraïdari (1889–1998, Έλλη Σουγιουλτζόγλου-Σεραϊδάρη)
- Yiorgos Depollas (born 1947)
- Mary Kay (landscape photographer)
- Yannis Kontos (born 1971)
- Vassilis Makris (born 1958)
- John Stathatos (born 1947)
- Dimitris Yeros (born 1948)
- Nikos Economopoulos (born 1953, Νίκος Οικονομόπουλος, Nikos Oikonomopoulos)
- Vassilis Makris (born 1958, Βασίλης Μακρής)
- Ianna Andreadis (born 1960)
- Tzeli Hadjidimitriou (born 1962, Jelly Hadjidimitriou, Τζέλη Χατζηδημητρίου)
- Johan Lolos (born 1987)

== See also ==
- History of Greek photography
