= Photography in Greece =

The history of Photography in Greece began in the mid-19th century with European pioneers like Gaspard-Pierre-Gustave Joly using the daguerreotype method to capture Greek landscapes. The first Greek photographer was the painter Filippos Margaritis (1839–1892), who opened the first professional studio in Athens in 1853. The field developed significantly with portraitists like Petros Moraitis and, critically, the Swiss photographer Frédéric Boissonnas, whose extensive landscape work (1903–1933) helped establish Greece's classical identity and promote the country as a tourist destination by visually linking its ancient past with its contemporary setting.

== 19th century photography ==
=== History ===
The History of Greek photography began with travellers from Canada and Europe to Greece.

Pierre Gustave Joly de Lotbiniere (1798–1865, Canadian) and Joseph-Philibert Girault de Prangey (1804–1892, French) were among the examples of persons who came to Greece and took photographs of Greece (daguerreotypes) in 1830s or 1840s.

In 1840s, Philibert Perraud (1815-1863?), a French photographer, came to Greece and taught photography to Filippos Margaritis (Greek painter), who was said to be the first Greek photographer and who later opened the first Greek professional photo studio in 1853, in Athens.

In 1859, Greek photographer Petros Moraites opened his photo studio in Athens with Athanasios Kalfas. He took many portraits of many Greek people including the royal family and around 1870 became one of the most notable photographers in Greece at that time.

According to a guide book published in 1891, 27 photo studios existed in Greece.

=== Major photographers ===
- Filippos Margaritis (1839–1892, )
- Leonidas Papazoglou (1872–1918, Λεωνίδας Παπάζογλου)

== The first half of 20th century ==
=== Major photographers ===
- Ali Sami Bey (c. 1872–c. after 1938 (?))
- Anastasios Gaziades (1853–1931) THE AMERICAN COLLEGE OF GREECE
- Panayotis Fatseas, Panayiotis Fatseas (1888–1938, Παναγιώτης Φατσέας) portraits 2008 exhibition at the Benaki Museum
- Nelly's, Elli Souyioultzoglou-Seraïdari (1889–1998, Έλλη Σουγιουλτζόγλου-Σεραϊδάρη)
- Nikolaos Tombazis (1894–1986, Νικόλαος Τομπάζης)
- Voula Papaioannou (1898–1990, Βούλα Παπαϊωάννου) documentary
- Pericles Papachatzidakis (1905–1990, Περικλής Παπαχατζιδάκης)
- Spyros Meletzis, Spiros Meletzis (1906–2003, Σπύρος Μελετζής)
- Dimitris Harissiadis (1911–1993, Δημήτρης Χαρισιάδης)
- Kostas Balafas (b. 1920–2011, Κώστας Μπαλάφας)

== The second half of 20th century and 21st century ==
=== History ===
In 1952, the Greek Photographic Society (EFE) was founded and in 1956 the First Panhellenic Exhibition of Photographic Art in Athens was organized.

=== Photographers ===
In order of year of birth

- Yiorgos Depollas (b. 1947, )
- John Stathatos (b. 1947, )
- Dimitris Yeros (b. 1948, )
- Nikos Economopoulos (b. 1953, Νίκος Οικονομόπουλος, Nikos Oikonomopoulos)
- Vassilis Makris (b. 1958, Βασίλης Μακρής)
- Ianna Andreadis (b. 1960, )
- Tzeli Hadjidimitriou (b. 1962, Jelly Hadjidimitriou, Τζέλη Χατζηδημητρίου)

== non-Greek photographers relating to Greece ==
- Pierre Gustave Joly de Lotbiniere (1798–1865, Canadian)
- Joseph-Philibert Girault de Prangey (1804–1892, French)
- Philibert Perraud (1815-1863?, French)
- Reverend George Wilson Bridges
- James Robertson (1813–1888)
- Francis Frith (1822–1898)
- Francis Bedford (1816–1894)
- Fred Boissonnas (1858–1946, Swiss photographer)
- Albert Meyer
- Alfred-Nicolas Normand
- Underwood & Underwood

== See also ==
- List of Greek photographers
- History of photography
- List of photographers
- History of Japanese photography
