= Tombazis =

Tombazis (Greek: Τομπάζης) is a surname of Greek origin. It was first recorded in 1668 in Hydra island, Greece, when the region was part of the Ottoman Empire. Notable people with the name are as follows:

- Alexandros Tombazis (born 1939), Greek architect
- Emmanouil Tombazis (1784–1831), Greek naval captain
- Iakovos Tombazis (c. 1782–1829), Greek merchant and ship-owner
- N. A. Tombazi, Nikólaos Tompázis (1894–1986), Greek photographer
- Nikolas Tombazis (born 1968), Greek racing car designer
