= Papazoglou =

Papazoglou (Greek: Παπάζογλου) is a Greek surname. The name comes from the Greek papas (priest) and Turkish oglou (oğlu - son), literally meaning priest's son. Notable people with this surname include:

== Men ==
- Anastasios Papazoglou (born 1988), Greek footballer
- Athanasios Papazoglou (born 1988), Greek footballer
- Leonidas Papazoglou (1872–1918), Greek photographer
- Michalis Papazoglou, Greek member of World War II resistance
- Nikos Papazoglou (1948–2011), Greek songwriter and singer
- Panagiotis Papazoglou, Greek mathematician (in his papers under the name Panos Papasoglu)
- Christopher Ryan (born 1950) (Born Christopher Papazoglou), British actor

== Women ==
- Orania Papazoglou (1951–2019), real name of American writer Jane Haddam
- Fanula Papazoglu (1917–2001), Yugoslav historian
