= Basilica of the Most Holy Trinity (Fátima) =

Church in Portugal

- Church of the Most Holy Trinity
- Portuguese: Basílica da Santíssima Trindade
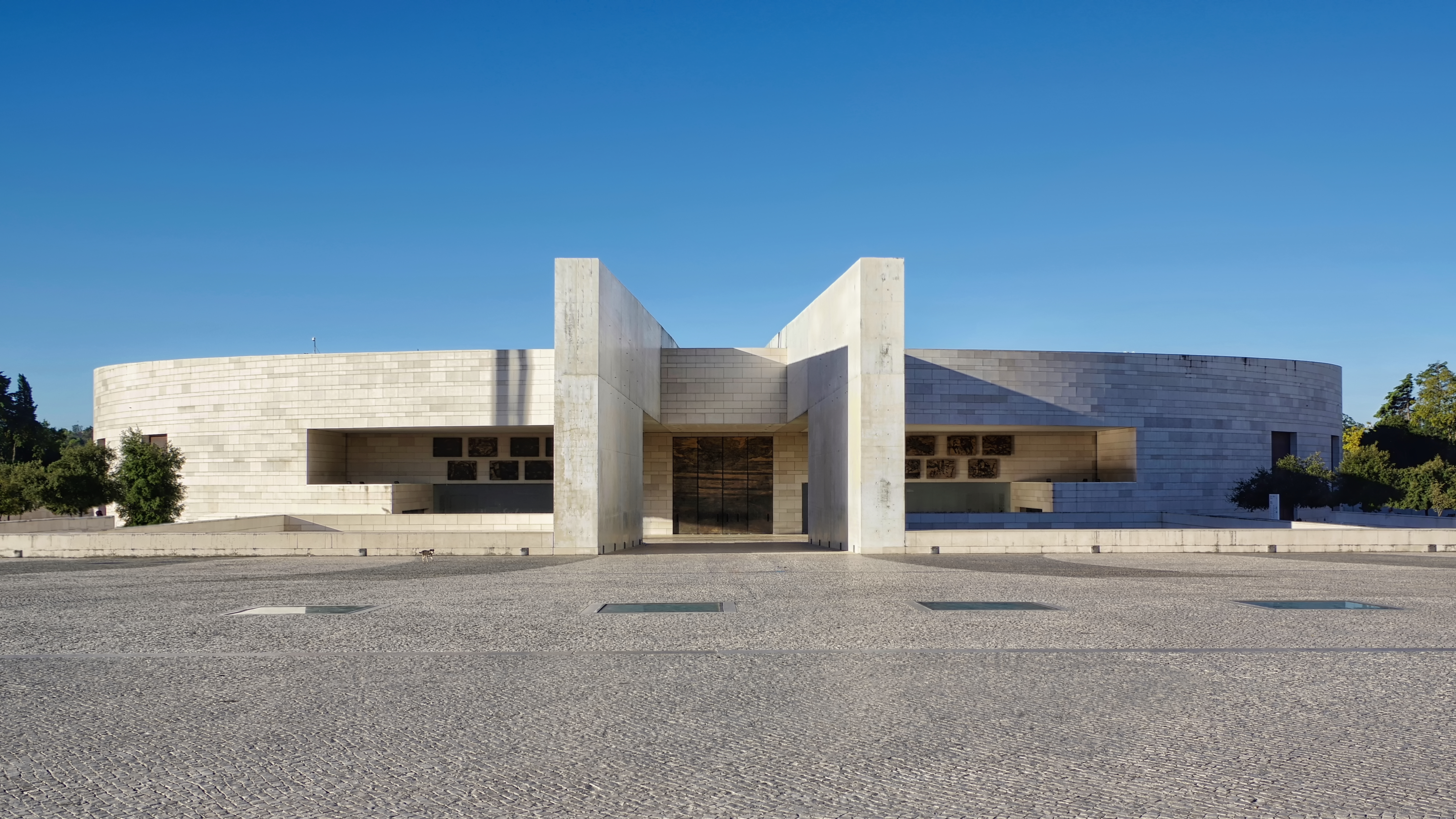
- The austere, simple facade of the modern Church and Minor Basilica of the Most Holy Trinity
- Basilica of the Most Holy Trinity
- 39°37′45.5″N 8°40′33″W
- Location: Fátima, Ourém, District of Santarém, Portugal
- Country: Portugal
- Denomination: Catholic Church
- Sui iuris church: Latin Church
- Website: www.fatima.pt

History
- Dedication: Holy Trinity

Architecture
- Architect: Alexandros Tombazis
- Style: Modern
- Years built: 1996

Specifications
- Length: 95 m (312 ft)
- Width: 115 m (377 ft)

Administration
- Diocese: Diocese of Leiria-Fátima

The Basilica of the Most Holy Trinity (Portuguese: Basílica da Santíssima Trindade) is a Catholic church and minor basilica in the Sanctuary of Fátima (Marian Shrine of Our Lady of Fátima) in Cova da Iria, in the civil parish of Fátima, in the municipality of Ourém in Portugal.

In 2009 it received the Outstanding Structure Award by the International Association for Bridge and Structural Engineering. IABSE awards the most remarkable, innovative, creative or otherwise stimulating structure completed within the last few years.

== History ==
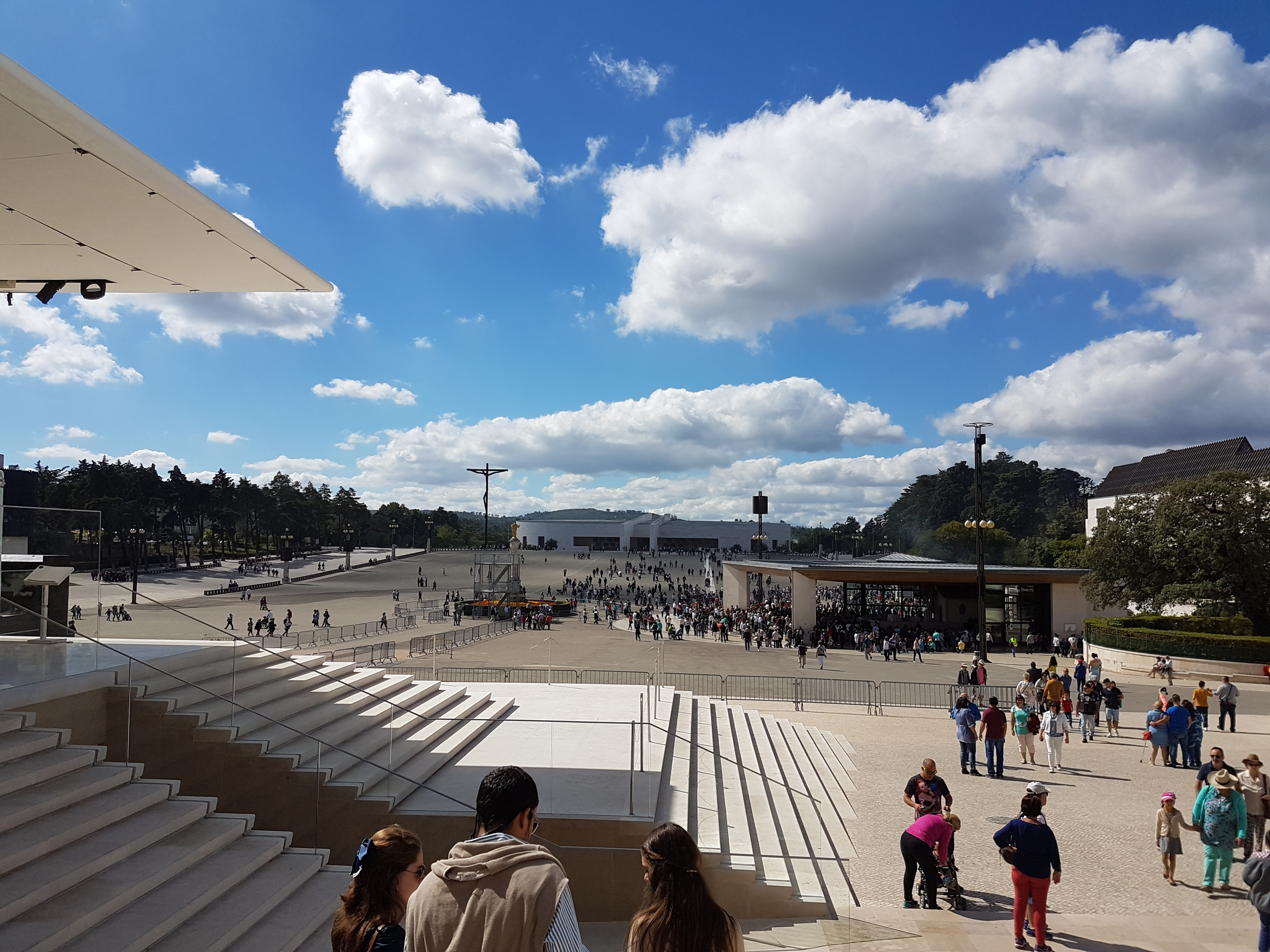
A perspective of the church within the perimeter of the Sanctuary of Fátima.

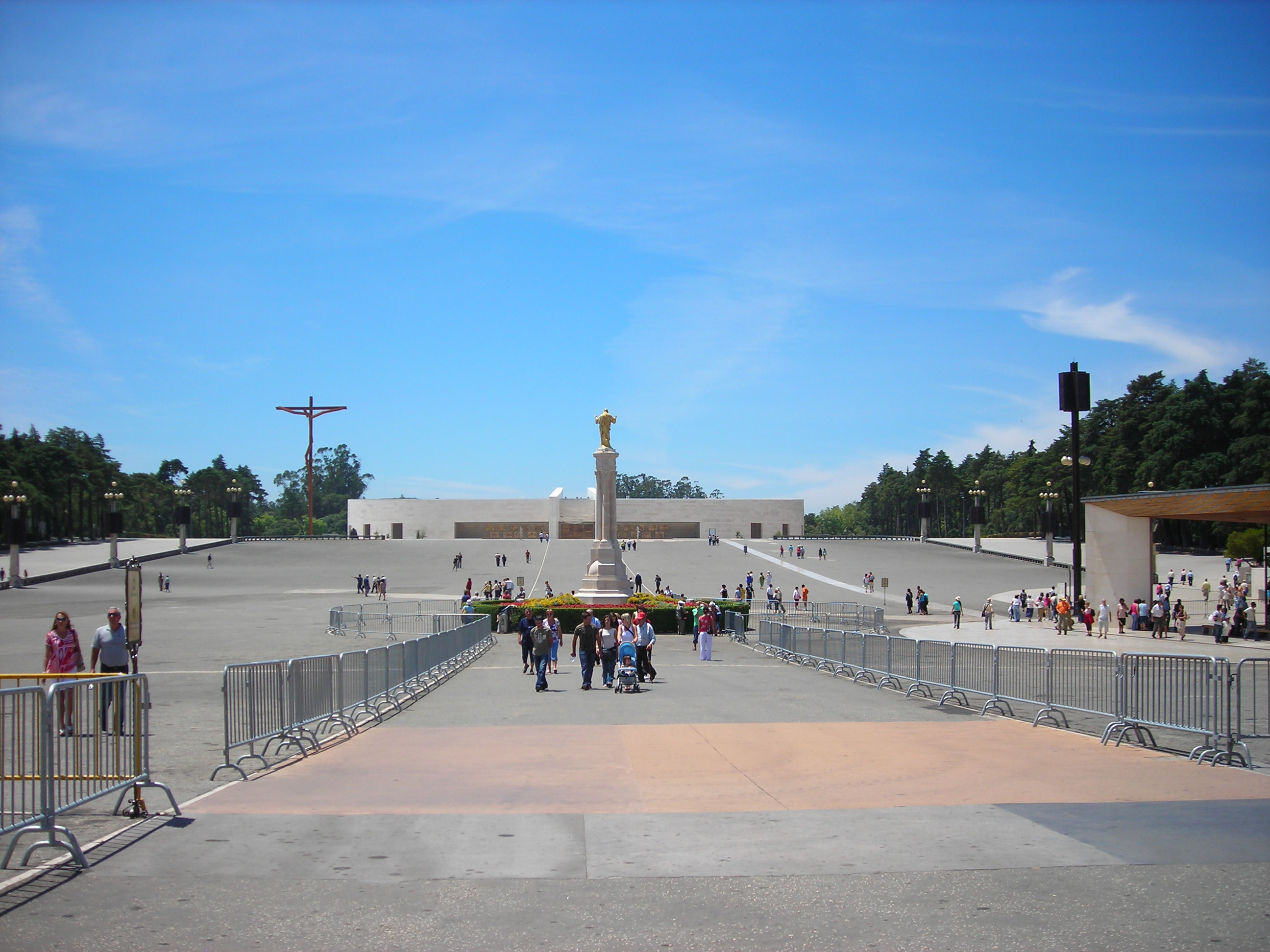
A close-up of the church statue/obelisk of the Sacred Heart of Jesus.

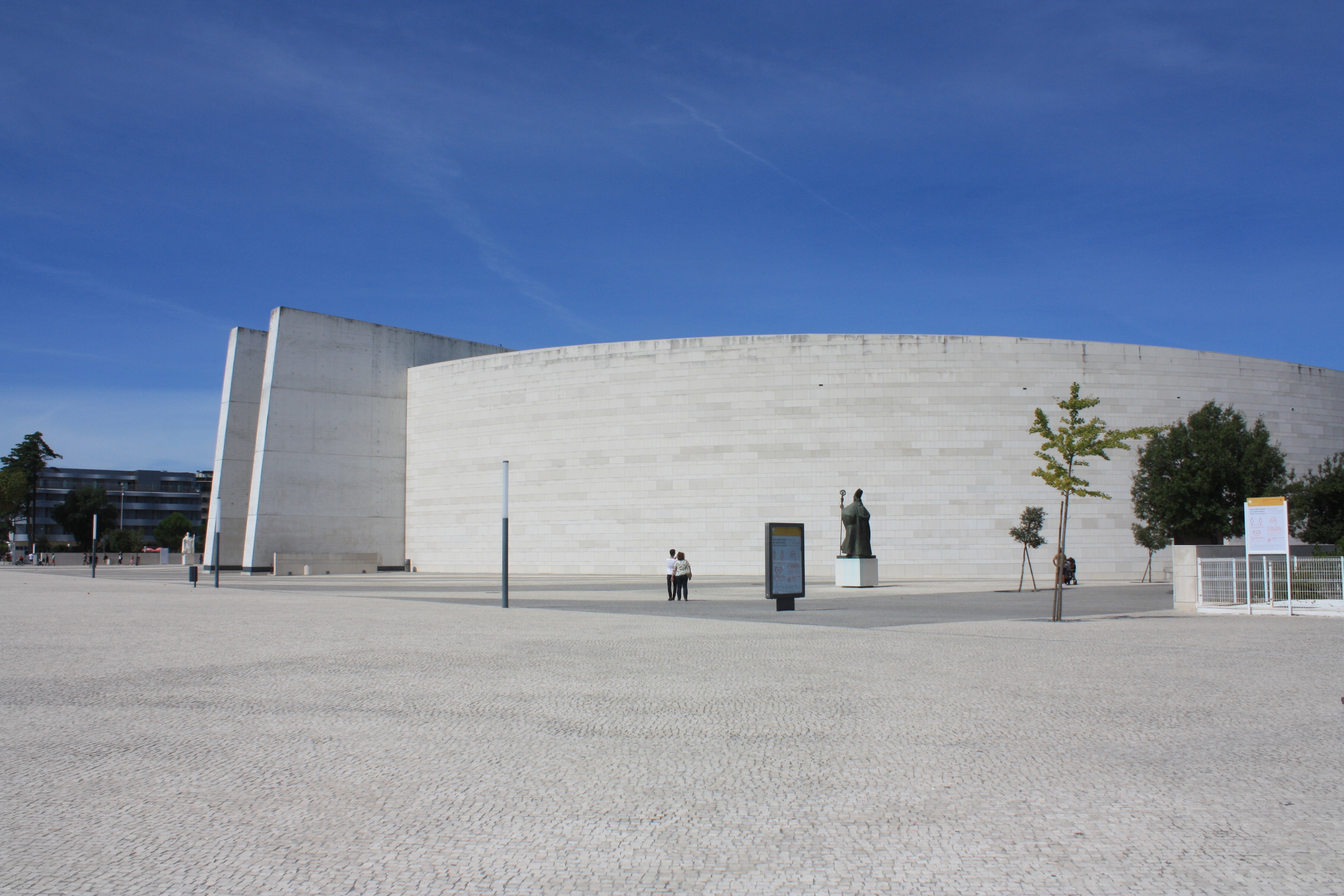
View from the Basilica's south side

In 1953, the Basilica of Our Lady of the Rosary of Fátima (Portuguese: Basílica de Nossa Senhora do Rosário de Fátima) was consecrated.

Situated on the southeast corner of the church, a statue of Pope Pius XII (sculpted in white marble by Portuguese sculptor Domingos Soares Branco) was first revealed to the public, in a ceremony that included a formal blessing. A statue of Pope Paul VI was erected in May 1968 (created by Portuguese sculptor Joaquim Correia) on the northwest corner of the church.

During the 1973 liturgical year, there were reports that the site could not handle the number of pilgrims on days of relatively minor volumes at the basilica. The inauguration of a restored statue of D. José Alves Correia da Silva (by Joaquim Correia), first bishop of the Diocese of Leiria, on 2 February 1973 proved to be chaotic and crowded.

In 1974 the rector of the sanctuary, Monsignor Luciano Guerra, proposed a pastoral program to include construction of a new large, covered assembly area, in order to handle the pilgrims. But, it was not until 1996 that construction of a new church at the complex was proposed. In the meantime, new religious symbols and reliquaries were added to the sanctuary, including a silver ostensorium by sculptor Zulmiro de Carvalho, in the main chapel of the Blessed Sacrament (Portuguese: Capela do Santíssimo Sacramento).

In 1997, the sanctuary organized an international design competition for proposals for the new church: the international jury selected the design of Greek architect Alexandros Tombazis on 19 December 1998. The work on the new church began in February 2004, with the cornerstone installed on 6 June of the same year. The first stone, laid by Serafim Ferreira e Silva, retired bishop of the Diocese of Leiria-Fátima, was blessed and donated by Pope John Paul II on 9 March 2004. It came from a marble fragment of Apostle Peter's tomb, located under the basilica in Rome. The placing of the cornerstone was a symbolic act, as the marble stone was later placed on display within the finished church for visiting pilgrims.

The church was dedicated on 12 October 2007, in the company of Cardinal Tarcisio Bertone, Secretary-of-State for the Vatican and then-legate to Pope Benedict XVI, as part of the closing ceremonies dedicated to 90th anniversary of the Marian apparitions of Fátima.

On 2 June 2008 was the inauguration of the 14 stations of the Via Lucis, executed by Italian artist Vanni Rinaldi. At the same time, a 3-metre (9.8 ft) image of Nossa Senhora de Fátima in Carrara marble was executed by Italian sculptor Benedetto Pietrogrande and installed in the interior of the church. From 2008 several artistic projects were carried out by various international contributors. Large 500-square-metre (5,400 ft^{2}) gilded terracotta panels in the presbytery were painted by a group of artists specializing in liturgical art. They came from eight nations and four Christian churches, based in the Pontifical Oriental Institute in Rome. The work was created and supervised by Slovenian artist Marko Ivan Rupnik.

On the walls of the confessional, azulejo panels, representing the episodes in the life of saints Peter and Paul, by architect Álvaro Siza Vieira, were mounted. A statute of Pope John Paul II by Polish sculptor Czeslaw Dzwigaj, was installed on the grounds in 2008 to the northeast of the church. A weathered steel cross, located in the church interior, approximately 34 metres (112 ft) high and 17 metres (56 ft) wide, was mounted at that time by German sculptor Robert Schad. A suspended sculpture by Cypriot artist Maria Loizidou was placed in the entrance portico, while the execution of the 8-metre (26 ft) doors in bronze, and panels from the Rosary, by Portuguese artist Pedro Calapez, were also completed; and 8-metre (26 ft) lateral doors in bronze, dedicated to the twelve apostles of Christ, with text by Portuguese artist Francisco Providência, were installed. Meanwhile, stained glass panels with Bible verses in six languages were installed by Canadian artist Kerry Joe Kelly, and a bronze crucifix, suspended over the main altar, was made by Irish artist Catherine Green.

On 19 June 2012, the Congregation for Divine Worship and the Discipline of the Sacraments sent word that the church would be elevated to the status of minor basilica, which came into effect on 13 August 2012.

== Architecture ==
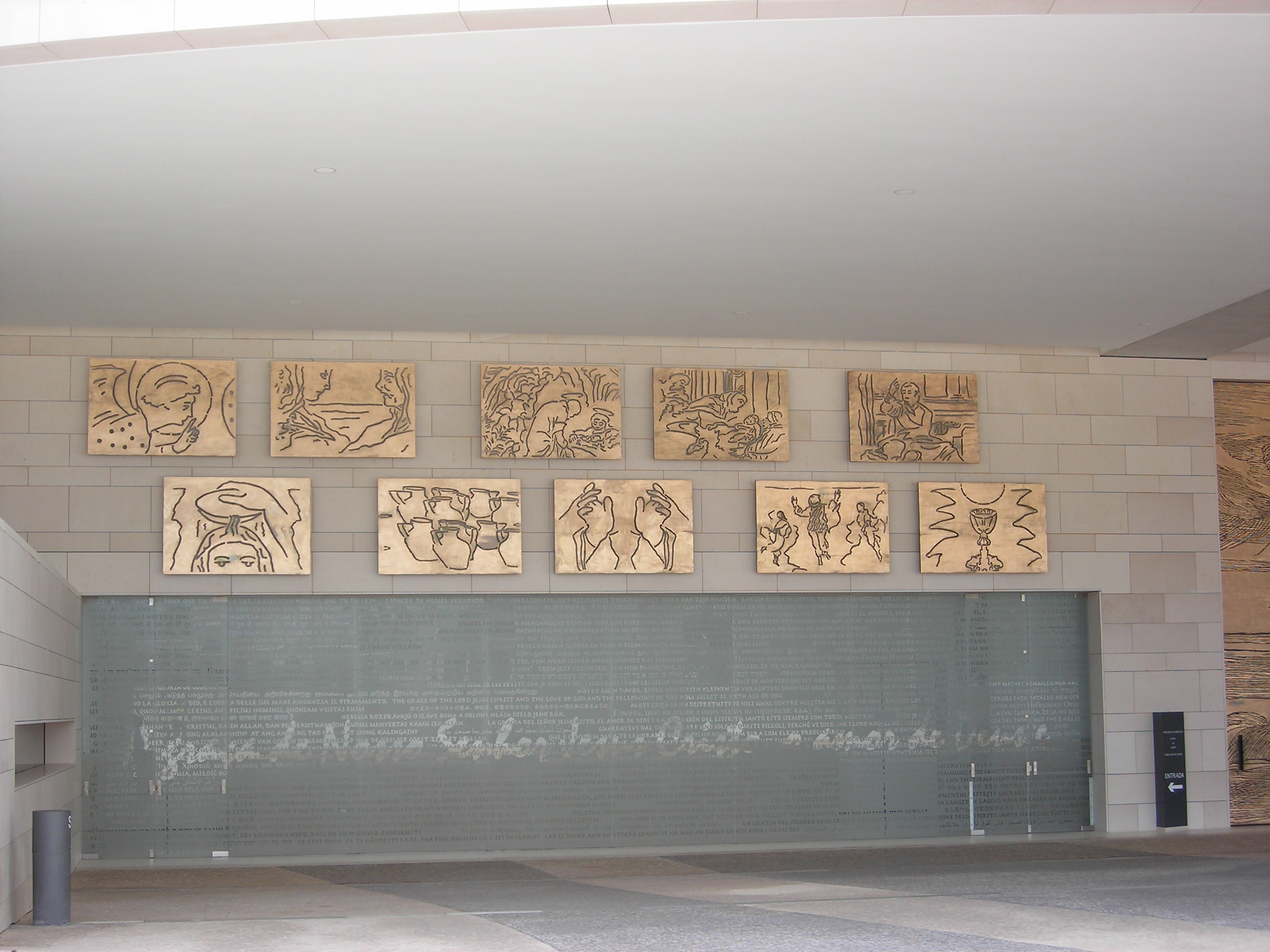
Decoration with the Mysteries of the Rosary in the facade of the basilica.

During two years of construction, the Basilica of the Holy Trinity was designated GECA, for Grande Espaço Coberto para Assembleias (Great Covered Space for Assemblies), owing to its relative importance. Due to its importance, not just for the sanctuary, the church and the town, the architects' planners started a dialog with the local authority to study the best urban solution for its location. The area of Avenida D. José A. C. Silva was lowered in front the sanctuary, and a competition introduced into the urban area a pedestrian zone from Rua S. Vicente de Paulo and Avenida João XXIII, transforming this area into a boulevard, reducing transit and providing an artistic touch to the subterranean landscape. These change would result in the transformation of Fátima into a destination for pilgrims.

The basilica is situated on the axis of two great roads in Fátima: north-south, a courtyard and extension to the south with the Pastoral Centre until Avenida João XXIII and east-west, Avenida D. José A.C.Silva. The church is located in the southeast corner of the sanctuary of Fátima.

During the analysis and revision of Alexandros Tombazis's original project, several modifications were made. A foyer was added that was designated as the Convivium de Santo Angostinho (Banquet of Saint Augustine) to be used when the GECA was used for congresses, meetings, musical concerts, and small theatrical pieces. In order to improve security and easy of access, many of the staircases were replaced with gentle ramps. The church's height was increased from the earlier designs to make it less buried.

Although its capacity remained unchanged, with space for 9,000 seated, the extra space to handle a standing-room crowd was rejected since it offered uncomfortable conditions for the users. In the end, a total of 8,633 seats were provided, including 76 spaces for people with special needs.

The plan of the building is marked by a gentle slope, permitting a good visibility of the altar from every angle. The interior is divided into two sectors, accomplished by a 2-metre (6.6 ft) partition: the first section has seating for 3,175 people (in addition to 58 spaces for handicapped); the second has 5,458 spaces (with 18 for handicapped). Meanwhile, the presbytery has a capacity for 100 celebrants.

The structure include several chapels: the Chapel of the Sacred Heart of Jesus (Portuguese: Capela do Sagrado Coração de Jesus), with 16 confessionals; the Chapel of the Immaculate Heart of Mary (Portuguese: Capela do Imaculado Coração de Maria), with 12 confessionals; the Chapel of the Resurrection of Jesus (Portuguese: Capela da Ressurreição de Jesus), with space for 200 and 16 confessionals; Chapel of the Death of Jesus (Portuguese: Capela da Morte de Jesus), with space for 600; and the Chapel of the Holy Sacrament (Portuguese: Capela do Santíssimo Sacramento), dedicated for Lausperene, a maximum of 200 continuous prayer venerates.

The simple modernist design is both functional and iconographic to express its religiosity. From the main portico, the Door of Christ brings attention to the transcendence of God. It represents the themes of Father, Son and Holy Spirit with iconic imagery.

Upon entering the assembly area is the presbytery at the end of the church, with the large crucifix and a large panel in mosaic representing a scene from the Apocalypse. Most of the interior decoration, including stations of the cross, were selected to provide a representation of the internal journey of self-sacrifice. This also includes a reference to the message of the Marian apparitions: penitence.

== Gallery ==
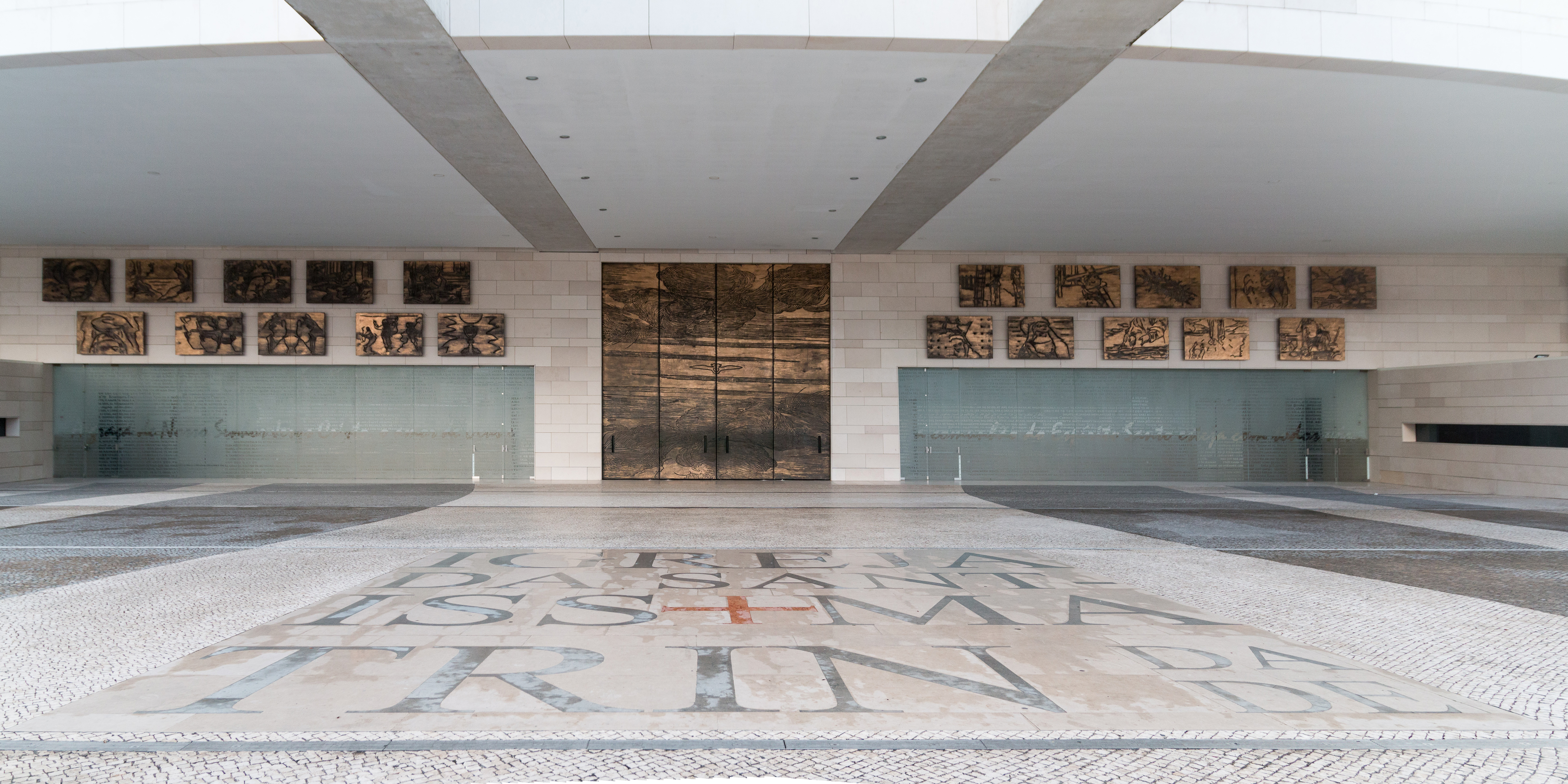
Entrance portico with bronze doors and panels

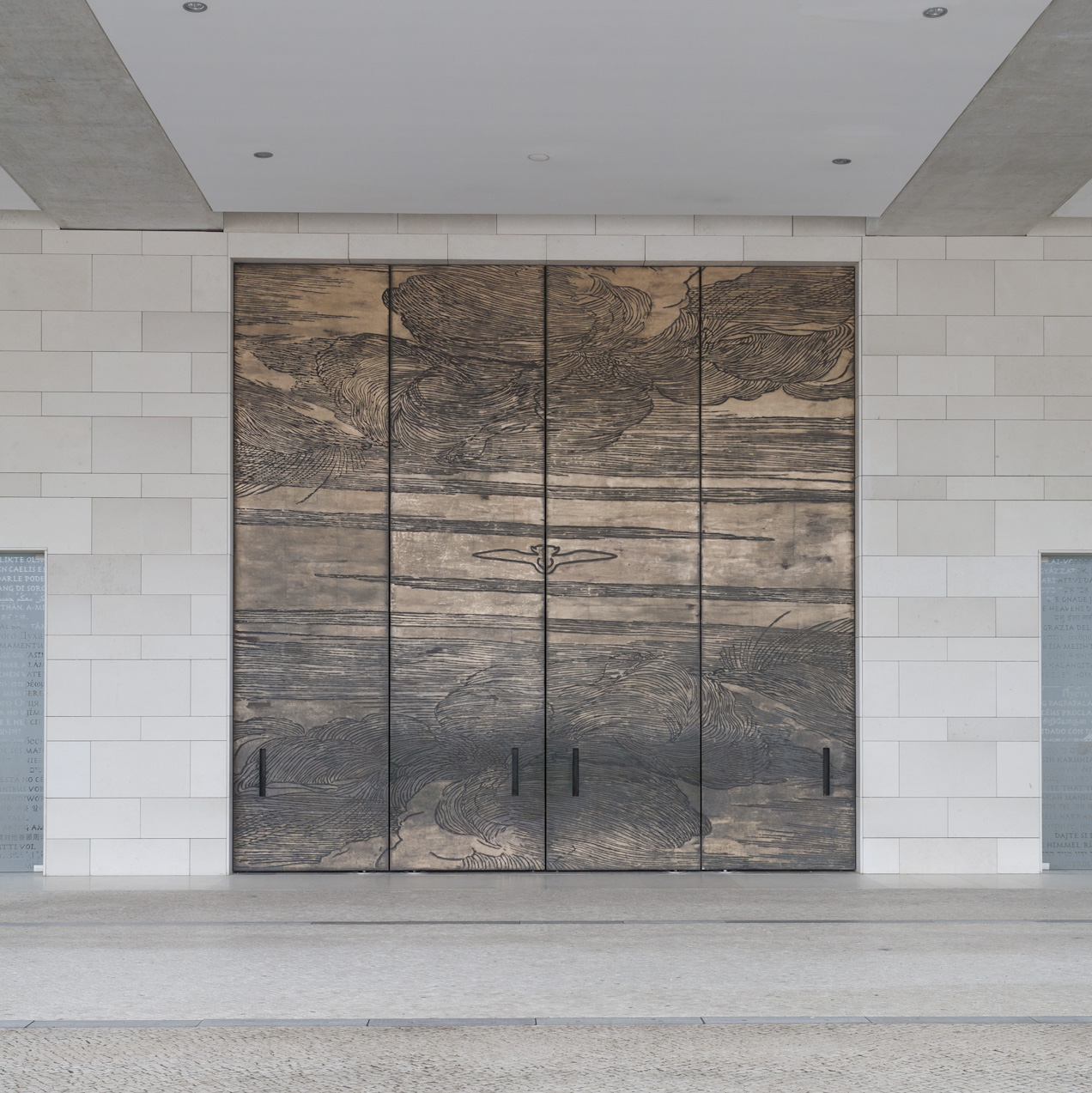
Pedro Calapez, entrance door of the Basilica of the Most Holy Trinity

Presbytery with the altar, suspended crucifix and gold mosaic

Interior looking towards the entrance

Side view of the seating, doors and roof

== See also ==
- Sanctuary of Our Lady of Fátima
- Chapel of the Apparitions
- Our Lady of Fátima
- First Saturdays Devotion
