= Panos Papasoglu =

Greek mathematician

Panos Papasoglu (Greek: Παναγιώτης Παπάζογλου; original name is also transliterated in English as Panagiotis Papazoglou) is a Greek mathematician, Lecturer of Mathematics at the Mathematics Department of the University of Oxford. His main research interests are group theory and geometric group theory.

He got his doctorate under Hyman Bass in Columbia University in 1993. Papasoglou taught at University of Paris XI until he returned to Greece in the early 2000s. He taught at the University of Athens until the late 2000s.
