= Tzeli Hadjidimitriou =

Greek photographer

Tzeli Hadjidimitriou (Greek: Τζέλη Χατζηδημητρίου) is a Greek independent filmmaker, fine art photographer, and travel writer from Lesbos, Greece. She is known for her work on cultural memory, LGBTQ issues, and rural Greek life. A pioneer in queer Greek cinema, her films include the award-winning Lesvia (2024), Sappho’s Granddaughters (2020) and Mr. Dimitris and Mrs. Dimitroula (2019).

Hadjidimitriou’s photographic books, such as In Communion With Stone (2009) and 39 Coffee Houses and a Barber’s Shop (1997), document vanishing traditions. She is the author of A Girl’s Guide to Lesbos (2012), the first travel guide to highlight the island’s lesbian cultural history.

== Biography ==
Tzeli Hadjidimitriou was born in Mytilene, Lesbos in 1962. Her ancestry goes back to immigrants from the Asia Minor, in a town near today's Ismir. She holds a degree in Economics from the University of Thessaloniki (1986) and a diploma in Italian Language and Culture from the Istituto Italiano di Cultura in Thessaloníki (1984). In 1986, she earned a master's qualification from Casa d'Italia in Athens, becoming an official translator for Italian (Greek-Italian).

Hadjidimitriou pursued studies in Rome in the field of Direction of Photography for Cinema (1986–1988). She attended cinema seminars taught by Michelangelo Antonioni, sponsored by the Università Cattolica del Sacro Cuore in Milan. Upon returning to Greece in 1988, the first course offered in Greece for film editing run in collaboration with ERT.

She has worked extensively in television and cinema as a movie stills photographer, collaborating with notable Greek directors such as Theodoros Angelopoulos, Tassos Boulmetis, Giorgos Panousopoulos, Giorgos Tsemperopoulos, Dimitris Vernikos and Anna Kessissoglou. Her contributions to publications include newspapers and magazines such as Geotropio (Eleftherotypia), Elliniko Panorama, Elle Greece, National Geographic Greece, Cup, Coffee and Tea, Voyager.

== Filmmaking ==
Hadjidimitriou's documentary work examines themes of gender, cultural preservation, and lesbian identity, primarily focused on the Greek island of Lesvos. Her films combine observational documentary techniques with archival material and personal narrative elements.

Her first feature-length documentary, Lesvia (2024), documents the lesbian community in Eressos using contemporary footage, archival materials dating from the 1980s onward, and personal accounts. The film incorporates excerpts from Sappho's poetry as a structural device. In her own words: "In all my previous works I have sought to capture the spirit of the people of Lesvos. In Lesvia - my first feature film - I also want to talk about my own intermediate, borderline experience as a proud member of the lesbian community and tell the story of how this community was created."

Her short films include:

- Sappho Singing (2020) which imagines Sappho in contemporary Eressos.
- Sappho’s Granddaughters (2019) featuring interviews with elderly women in Eressos.
- In Search of Orpheus (2019) documenting narratives from Lesvos fishermen that icorporate Greek mythology, the myth of Orpheus in particular.
- Mr. Dimitris and Mrs. Dimitroula (2019), an intimate portrait of a gender-nonconforming individual from Sykamia, Lesvos.
- Salt and Bread (2018) which observes traditional practices in Lesvos, including ouzo distillation and boatbuilding.

== Film awards ==
Hadjidimitriou's films have received recognition at several international film festivals:

Selected awards for Lesvia (2024):

- Greek Film Center Award for Best Greek Debut - Thessaloniki Documentary Festival
- Mermaid Award (Special Mention) - Thessaloniki Documentary Festival
- Audience Award - Festival Écrans Mixtes, Lyon
- Jury Award - Festival Écrans Mixtes, Lyon
- Audience Award - Wicked Queer, Boston
- Audience Award - Pink Apple, Zürich
- ZG Gran Award - Zinegoak FF, Bilbao
- Best Feature Award (DOK International Jury) - Zinegoak FF
- Festival Favorites Award - Cinema Diverse, Palm Springs
- Director's Choice Award - Cinema Diverse, Palm Springs
- Special Mention (Official Competition) - Queer Porto
- Best Documentary Feature - Out at the Movies, USA
- QueerScope Debut Film Prize - Germany
- Best Documentary (Jury Award) - LesGaiCineMad, Spain
- Prix de la Fédération Française des Festivals LGBTQIA+ - Chéries-Chéris, Paris
- Special Mention (Official Competition) - DocFest Chalkida
- Memory of the Mediterranean Award - Marseille

For other works:

- Sappho's Granddaughters (2020): Festival Award - Ierapetra International FF
- Salt and Bread (2018): Sound Award - DocFest Chalkida
- In Search of Orpheus (2019):
  - Best Greek Documentary - AegeanDocs
  - Special Award - West Side Mountains Doc Fest
- Mr. Dimitris and Mrs. Dimitroula (2020): Streeen Award - Divine Queer Torino
- Sappho Singing (2020): Best Foreign Short Documentary - Queer International FF, Mexico

== Photographic books ==
She published books that are bilingual English and Greek, although the dust cover of some books are only in one of the two languages:

- In Communion With Stone, The Rural Architecture of Lesvos | Συνομιλώντας με τα Πνεύματα της Πέτρας, η Αγροτική Αρχιτεκτονική της Λέσβου Crete University Press Photographic album. Texts: N.Sifounakis, N.Stefanou, Ch.Hatzilias, Tzeli Hadjidimitriou. ISBN 978-960-524-298-5
- Time fading into clouds | O χρόνος χάθηκε στα σύννεφα. Texts from: N. Vatopoulos, N. Chronas, Tz. Hadjidimitriou, Metaichmio, 2003, ISBN 960-375-634-2
- Kythera | Kύθηρα. Crete University Press, 2000, ISBN 960-524-119-6
- Urban Housing of the '30s; Modern Architecture in Pre-war Athens | Σπίτια του '30, Mοντέρνα αρχιτεκτονική στην προπολεμική Aθήνα. Texts from: M. Kardamitsi, N. Meras, P. Nikolaidis, P. Tournikiotis, M. Philippidis, D. Philippidis, Nereus Editions, 1998, ISBN 960-7597-11-7
- 39 Coffee Houses and a Barber's shop | 39 Kαφενεία και ένα Kουρείο. Texts from: A. Fasianos, F. Frangouli, G Chronas, E. Papataxiarchis, G. Nikolakakis, Th. Paraskevaidis, Crete University Press, 1997, ISBN 960-524-044-0
- Sacred Water: The Mineral Springs of Lesvos | Tο Aγιο Nερό: Oι Iαματικές Πηγές της Λέσβου. Texts from: G. Maniotis, G. Doukakis, Tz. Hadjidimitriou, 1996, ISBN 960-90330-0-8

== Travel guide books ==
- In search of Kythera and Antikythera A traveller's guide about the island of Kythera and Antikythera; research, texts and photographs by Tzeli Hadjidimitriou. self publishing (English language), 2013 ISBN 978-960903305-3
- A girl’s guide to Lesbos A traveller's guide about the island of Lesvos with an LGBT orientation; research, texts and photographs by Tzeli Hadjidimitriou. self publishing (English language), 2012 ISBN 960903303-2
- (in Greek) Ανεξερεύνητη Λέσβος (Uncharted Lesvos), research, photography and text by Tzeli Hadjidimitriou, Road Editions, 2006. ISBN 960-8189-77-2
- (in Greek) Ανεξερεύνητα Αντικύθηρα, Κύθηρα (Unexplored Antikythera, Kythera), research, photography and text by Tzeli Hadjidimitriou, Road Editions, 2008.

== Solo exhibitions ==
- Under the Dancing Light, at Kudos Gallery, Sydney, NSW, Australia
- Aura from the island of Sappho, at Zero, 798 Art Space, Beijing, China, 2016. The well known poet Lan Lan, presented at the opening of the exhibition, her latest collection of poems, “Sappho: A Loose Bouquet”
- Lesvos, the island of hidden harmony, at Sismanogleio Megaro, Greek Consulate, Istanbul, Turkey, 2015.
- Time fading into clouds, at Choros Technis 24 Gallery, Athens, 04 - 31 October 2004.
- A Journey in Kythera, audio & video show at the Cultural Centre of Nea Smyrni, Athens, in cooperation with the network Mediterranean S.O.S., 2002.
- The Sacred Water, at the Natural History Museum of the Lesvos Petrified Forest with pictures from the book. 2000.
- The Sacred Water and of 39 Coffee Houses and a Barber’s Shop, slide presentation of the two books at Petra, Lesvos, 1998.
- The colour of Greece, in the Municipal Gallery of Molyvos, Lesvos, 17–27 June 1997.
- La Grecia vista dalla finestra, (Greece seen from the window):
  - in Centro Culturale La Plaka (La Plaka cultural centre), Padua, Italy 11–30 November 1995.
  - in the Istituto Ellenico di Studi Bizantini e Postbizantini (Institute of Byzantine Studies), in Venezia, from 3 March 1996.

== Group exhibitions ==
- Dancing nudes at Al Iquando Gallery, Paris, France, 2009
- mommy art ’08 – the artAZ sessions no 2, mommy, Athens, 2008
- Presentation of the slide show Sacred Water at the Wind’s Hammam in cooperation with the network “Mediterranean S.O.S.”, Athens, 2008.
- Once upon a time there was Penelope Delta, Athens College, Athens, 2006.
- A Table, Skoufa gallery, Athens, 2005.
- Aquarium, at Saint Nicolas Bay Hotel, Saint Nicolas, Crete, 2005.
- Zoom on Greece, at Sismanogleio Building in Konstantinople, Turkey, 2004
- In conjunction with the Cheap Art Team different exhibitions in Athens, 2004.
- A little blue...., at Saint Nicolas Bay Hotel, Saint Nicolas, Crete, 2004.
- In Praise of the Olive organized by the Academy of Athens, 2004.
- Joining the Girl Power Team and participating in the events organized in cooperation with the Greek Anticancer Society and the Municipality of Athens. 2003.
- Participation in the Kythera Photographic Encounters, 2002.
- Water of life, participation in the celebrations of the European Heritage Days, 2000.
- 2000 Tin Cans, at The Lithographer’s Workshop at Piraeus Street, Athens, 2000.
- 39 Coffee Houses and a Barber Shop, based on her book with the participation of several artists, at Psihari 36 Gallery, Athens, 2000.
- Mediterranean, A Source of Life and Civilization, in cooperation with the network Mediterranean S.O.S. several Greek towns and Mediterranean countries, 1999.
- Piraeus Street, Transformations of an Industrial Landscape, Athens, 1997.
- Aegean Trajectories in Light and Time, Skopelos Photographic Centre, Skopelos, 1997.

== Articles ==
Hadjidimitriou's works have been published by newspapers and magazines. They include;

- (in English) Kathimerini, (7 December 1998); (15 January 2001); (20 August 2006)
- Ta Nea, (20 October 2004)
- Eleftherotypia,(29 December 2003)
- To Vima, on the publication of 39 Coffee Houses and a Barber's shop (1 March 1998) (24 April 2000)
- Dimokratis, (23 April 2007)
