= Kythera Photographic Encounters =

Kythera Photographic Encounters (in Greek, Φωτογραφικές Συναντήσεις Κυθήρων) is an annual photographic event taking place at the end of every September on the Greek island of Kythera (Cerigo). First started in 2002 and organised by the non-profit Kythera Cultural Association under the artistic direction of John Stathatos, they bring together a cross-section of Greek photographers, photography critics, art historians and curators for four days of exhibitions, lectures, seminars and assorted events, leavened by informal debates on all aspects of photography. Though the emphasis is on Greek photography, an attempt is made to include at least one foreign participant every year.

The core events are a two-day Conference on the History of Greek Photography, which includes lectures based on ongoing research in all aspects of Greek photography as well as presentations of their own work by selected photographers, and the one-day Young Photographers' Encounters whose programming changes every year.

Every year, Greece's only national photography prizes are also awarded at the end of the Encounters: an award for the best Greek photographic book of the year, formerly the Milos Prize and now the Municipality of Kythera Award, and the Young Photographers Award, which goes to the best work in an annual open submission exhibition for Greek photographers under thirty-five.

A number of exhibitions are also held in various ad hoc venues around the island; these include the work of contemporary photographers such as Yannis Kontos, Yiorgis Yerolimbos, Sokratis Mavrommatis and Susan Trangmar amongst others, as well as exhibitions of historical interest by such figures as the surrealist poet Andreas Embirikos and the early 20th-century Kytherian portraitist Panayotis Fatseas (1888–1938).

== Winners of the Municipality of Kythera Award ==
- 2003, Yiorgos Depollas (photographer), for his monograph On the Beach
- 2004, Haris Kakarouchas (photographer), for his monograph Suspended Time
- 2005, Costis Antoniadis (curator) and Yiorgos Golobias (collector) for the monograph Leonidas Papazoglou
- 2006, Kostis Vardikos (photographer) for his monograph Portraits of a Family of Friends, and Sakis Serefas & Haris Yiakoumis for Thessaloniki in the First Person
- 2007, Fanni Konstantinou (editor) for the monograph Voula Papaioannou
- 2008, Natassa Markidou (photographer) for the monograph Constructions
- 2009, Georgia Imsiridou (editor) for the monograph D.A. Charissiadis
