= Johan Lolos =

Belgian photographer

- Born: 1987 (age 37–38); Liège, Belgium
- Occupation: Photographer
- Years active: 2014–present
- Notable work: Peaks of Europe (2018)
- Website: www.johanlolos.com

Johan Lolos (born 1987) is a Belgian-Greek photographer who specializes in travel and landscape photography. He is also known by his social media pseudonym lebackpacker and has been cited as the most-followed Belgian photographer on Instagram. Lolos was born in Liège, Belgium.

== Education ==
Lolos earned a master's degree in public relations from the Institut des Hautes Études des Communications Sociales (IHECS) in Brussels in 2013.

== Career ==
After completing his studies, Lolos embarked on a two-year journey through Australia and New Zealand, during which he honed his landscape photography. His work gained attention on social media platforms, particularly Instagram, where he shares his photographs under the alias lebackpacker. In 2018, Lolos published his first book, Peaks of Europe, documenting a five-month road trip across 17 European countries. The book was released in four languages.

Lolos has collaborated with Toyota, Samsung, Nikon, and Médecins Sans Frontières. He has conducted workshops and mentorship sessions. His work has been published in National Geographic, GQ and Lonely Planet. In 2023, Belgian weekly magazine Le Vif included Lolos in its "40 Under 40" list of "40 Belgian Personalities to Watch".

== Publications ==
- Peaks of Europe. Lannoo, 2018. ISBN 978-2390250449.
  - Also available in German (Dumont), French (Glénat) and Italian (Rizzoli) under different titles.

== Solo exhibitions ==
- Solitudes, Buronzu Gallery, Liège, 2023
