= Nikolas Tombazis =

Greek automotive engineer (born 1968)

- Born: 22 April 1968 (age 58); Athens, Greece
- Occupation: Single seater director of the FIA
- Known for: Formula One car designer at Benetton, Ferrari, McLaren, and Manor

Nikolas Tombazis (Greek: Νικόλαος Τομπάζης, romanized: Nikólaos Tompázis; born 22 April 1968) is a racing car designer who is the single seater director of the FIA since 2023. Previously, he was the FIA head of single seater technical matters from 2018 to 2023. During his Formula One career, which began in 1992, he worked for Benetton (1992–1997), Ferrari (1997–2004; 2006–2014), McLaren (2004–2006), and Manor (2016–2017), with significant success at both Benetton and Ferrari as part of the Ross Brawn, Rory Byrne, and Michael Schumacher era.

In November 1992, Tombazis became an aerodynamicist at Benetton and was promoted to head of aerodynamics in 1994. Three years later, he moved to Ferrari, where he became head of aerodynamics and computational fluid dynamics (CFD) in 1998. In 2004, Tombazis returned to England to work with McLaren, where he started working in a similar position and later being promoted to head of planning. In March 2006, he was back at Ferrari, this time as chief designer. He left Ferrari in December 2014. In January 2016, he became the chief aerodynamicist of Manor, which was ultimately closed down in March 2017 before the start of the new season. Subsequently, Tombazis began working for the FIA, overseeing the 2022 and 2026 Formula One regulations.

Overall, Tombazis helped the teams win seven Drivers' Championships (six of Schumacher's seven Drivers' titles and Kimi Räikkönen's sole Drivers' title in 2007, which is also the last Drivers' champion for Ferrari as of 2026) and eight Constructors' Championships (one with Benetton in 1995 and seven with Ferrari from 1999–2003 and 2007–2008). His championship-winning cars won 84 races out of 151 Grands Prix (56.6%), obtained 69 pole positions, reached a podium finish 177 times, and had 75 fastest laps. This made Tombazis among the most successful Formula One aerodynamicists and designers.

== Early life and education ==
Tombazis was born on 22 April 1968 in Athens, Greece, the son of well-known Greek architect Alexandros Tombazis, whose father was the Greek geologist and photographer N. A. Tombazi. He was expected to become an architect like his father; however, by the age of 10, he became passionate about Formula One during the years of the Lotus 78 and Lotus 79. These Formula One regulations had an heavy emphasis on aerodynamics, including ground effect, a concept that would be brought back to Formula One by Tombazis in the 2022–2025 regulations.

As part of a school project about an individual particularly admired, Tombazis wrote a five-page essay about Colin Chapman. After finishing his high-school studies, Tombazis graduated with a degree in engineering (with a specialisation in aerodynamics) in 1989 from Trinity College at Cambridge University, followed by a PhD in aeronautical engineering from Imperial College London in 1992. It was during his time at Cambridge that he met James Allison, who would become his fellow aerodynamicist at Ferrari.

== Formula One career ==
=== Benetton ===
Following his graduation, Tombazis joined Formula One. After talks failed with McLaren of Ron Dennis, he found a job announce on Autosport stating that Benetton was searching personnel for its aerodynamic department and he was hired to be part of the Team Enstone led by Brawn and Byrne. When Tombazis joined the team in November 1992 as an aerodynamicist, Benetton was on the rise and he was promoted chief aerodynamicist by 1993 and head of aerodynamics by 1994, the year when the team challenged for the world title. The Benetton B194 he helped to design went on to win the 1994 Drivers' title with Schumacher, the first of his seven world titles. The season was marred by tragedy due to the deaths of Roland Ratzenberger and Ayrton Senna, as well as several controversies, most notably the allegations of cheating during the 1994 Formula One World Championship and the bans of Schumacher that allowed Damon Hill to rebound and take the championship to the final round, although the cheating allegations did not involve aerodynamics. Tombazis later described the deaths of drivers, citing as example the death of Senna, as among his worst moments. When the halo was adopted for the 2018 season, he said that "while the aesthetics are clearly not its strong point, we need to do what we can to keep the drivers safe."

As a result of Benetton's win in 1994 and the move of Willem Toet to Ferrari, Tombazis was promoted to head of aerodynamics. Along with Brawn and Byrne, he helped to design the Benetton B195, which was a significant improvement over the B194. The B195 driven by Schumacher went on to win the Drivers' title in 1995 and this time Benetton, which in doing so felt vindicated from the 1994 allegations, also won the Constructor's title without any controversy. During this time, in addition to his good relations with Byrne, he was put under the mentorship of Brawn; however, the loss of Schumacher in 1996 and the subsequent loss of Brawn and Byrne, who followed Schumacher at Ferrari in 1997 as the team had become the main challenger of Williams, meant that Benetton was no longer able to fight for the championship. By 1997, Brawn was able to lure Tombazis to Ferrari.

=== Ferrari ===
Ferrari had not won a title since 1979. And if working in a Formula One team naturally exposes you to pressure, there in Maranello it was probably multiplied by 10. We knew we had the best driver, so there were no excuses: we had to do it. And when the victory came at Suzuka in 2000, it was a satisfaction that cannot be explained.

— Nikolas Tombazis

Tombazis was among the key personnel who moved to Ferrari to rebuild the team, and they were from a wide range of nationalities, including from Australia (Chris Dyer), France (Jean Todt and Gilles Simon), Germany (Schumacher), Greece (Tombazis), South Africa (Byrne), and the United Kingdom (Brawn, Tad Czapski, and Nigel Stepney). When Tombazis joined Ferrari, the team was on the rise, having finished as the runner-up (narrowly ahead of Benetton) in 1996 thanks to Schumacher, and became the main challenger of Williams in 1997 and of McLaren in the late 1990s and early 2000s.

At Maranello, Tombazis found a significantly different environment as the sports and motorsport daily newspapers gave so much attention to Ferrari, raising the pressure. He also rejoined with Toet, and the two worked hard to design a competitive Ferrari, which they did as Schumacher in both 1997 and 1998 took the championship to the final round against the superior Adrian Newey-designed FW19 and MP4/13, respectively driven to the title by Jacques Villeneuve of Williams and Mika Häkkinen of McLaren.

By 1999, Tombazis was promoted to head of aerodynamics and CFD, as Toet had left Ferrari for British American Racing, with Allisson as the other key aerodynamicist. In 1999, Ferrari once again lost the Drivers' title as Schumacher broke his right leg at the 1999 British Grand Prix and Eddie Irvine, also thanks to some help from Mika Salo and Schumacher upon his return, led the championship into the final round but was beaten by Häkkinen; however, Ferrari was able to win the Constructors' title, their first title since 1983. As a result of the Drivers' title loss in 1999, Tombazis later recalled the year as bittersweet.

Notably, at the 1999 Malaysian Grand Prix, the second-last round, the Ferrari drivers had achieved a 1–2. The returning Schumacher recorded a pole position by almost one second over Irvine in second. Early in the race, Schumacher let Irvine pass him by for the championship and attempted to hold up and slow down the McLarens. Schumacher, who was on a one-stop strategy and was recording a series of fastest laps, subsequently slowed down to let Irvine pass him in the final laps after he had overtaken him at the pits. The Ferrari drivers were subsequently disqualified due to flow diverters being declared illegal because they were too small by 10 mm, meaning that Häkkinen and McLaren were champions with a round to spare; however, the disqualification of Ferrari was overturned on appeal because the team successfully argued that the measurement tolerance was within the limits of the specific regulation at 10 mm.

In 2000, Ferrari once again won the Constructors' title but also won with Schumacher the Drivers' title, the first since 1979, and as a result Tombazis later described this as the "real special moment" and said the satisfaction was something that "cannot be explained". This sparked the years of Ferrari dominance, which would not be equalled and broken until over a decade later by Mercedes and Lewis Hamilton in the hybrid era (2014–2021), leading to four more Drivers' and Constructors' titles. By May 2003, Tombazis wanted a new challenge and left Ferrari for 2004. He later regretted this choice and came to better appreciate these years.

=== McLaren ===
Looking back, I cannot be that proud of that car. I see it more as Adrian's creation; I do not feel like I made much of a tangible contribution.

— Nikolas Tombazis

In 2004, Tombazis joined the McLaren as a chief aerodynamicist and head of planning, meaning that he was in charge of aerodynamic development. When he joined McLaren, the team had just produced the McLaren MP4-19, one of the few bad designs of Newey (alongside the Aston Martin AMR26 in 2026), which never debuted due to its many issues. As a result, Tombazis contributed to the design of the MP4-19B, which significantly improved the car's aerodynamics and results with several podiums and one win by Räikkönen at the 2004 Belgian Grand Prix in a year dominated by Ferrari. Despite a promising end of the season and the inauguration of the McLaren Technology Centre, Tombazis was not happy and did not feel the same good relations and positive pressures of his Ferrari years. Among these difficulties, his relationship with fellow aerodynamicist Newey allowed him to improve.

In 2005, Tombazis was promoted to project chief director (second only to Newey) and the MP4-20 proved to be competitive but fragile as it challenged Renault (which had acquired Benetton in 2000 and rebranded it as Renault in 2002) of eventual world champion Fernando Alonso; it won 10 out of the 19 races but suffered many reliability issues, finishing 9 points behind Renault. He later said that he could not be truly proud of the MP4-20 because he felt it was mainly a design of Newey and that he did not contribute enough to it. Despite this, he played an important role in the design of the 2005 car, and was promoted in April 2005 to the role of director of vehicle projects, which de facto made him the team's chief designer. As he missed the environment of Maranello, Tombazis returned to Ferrari for 2006. The announcement was made in February 2006 following the departure of Newey to Red Bull; Tombazis was to report to Aldo Costa, who was promoted to head of design and development and in turn would report to Brawn, alongside Byrne, who decided to stay at Ferrari in the new role of design and development consultant.

=== Return to Ferrari ===
At one point, I thought victories were easy, almost guaranteed. What a fool I was! Looking back, I realise I did not appreciate those moments enough and actually wanted to leave. Every time I think about it, I tell myself I was an idiot.

— Nikolas Tombazis

In March 2006, Tombazis returned to Ferrari in the higher role of chief designer, alongside Costa, Simone Resta, Tiziano Battistini, and Mario Almondo. He soon returned to success as his first design, the F2007, led Räikkönen to the Drivers' title after one of the biggest comebacks in Formula One history, with Felipe Massa contributing to the Constructors' title in a year marred by Stepneygate. This was followed by the F2008, which was narrowly lost by Massa in the last round, where Ferrari won the Constructors' title. These successes were followed by difficulties for 2009 as the car was behind in development compared to the eventual champions of Brawn GP.

By 2010, Ferrari was more competitive compared to 2009 but was behind Red Bull, McLaren, and Lotus in the 2010–2013 years, (Note: Among these years, 2012 is the most controversial. While Alonso's performance in the Ferrari F2012 that Tombazis designed (he was the chief designer) is often regarded as "one of the finest ever that failed to deliver a title", there is some disagreement about the true ranking of Ferrari. Some argued that it was as bad as the fourth or fifth best car, while others argued that it was the best car when accounting for reliability. Most experts and mathematical models found that Red Bull had a significant advantage over Ferrari in 2010 (the Ferrari F10) and 2012, and Alonso was generally ranked by team principals and mathematical models as the best driver in both years. A 2012 analysis of raw pace for the year showed that while the F2012 slightly reduced the gap that the Ferrari F150 of 2011 had over the fastest car (0.83), it dropped from third to fourth, just behind Lotus (the team that improved the most among the championship-contenting cars) and was still significantly behind Red Bull and McLaren (0.75). In the words of Andrew J. K. Phillips, an applied mathematician and creator of the F1metrics model, "even with its poor reliability, the model thinks [the RB8] should have won both championships relatively easily." Similarly, a 2015 analysis (based on F1metrics, the 2014 mathematical model created by Phillips) found that Ferrari and Lotus were closely matched for third place in 2012 and that Ferrari was significantly behind McLaren and Red Bull in 2010. The same analysis (based on the updated 2019 mathematical model by Phillips) found that Ferrari was the second best car of 2012, "clearly behind Red Bull but just ahead of Lotus and significantly ahead of McLaren". A 2025 analysis of another mathematical model (inspired by F1metrics) for the 2009–2013 years found that Ferrari was third but closely matched with McLaren for second place in 2010, a distant third behind McLaren and Red Bull in 2011, and in fifth place in 2012, albeit very close to McLaren (fourth) and Sauber (third), behind Lotus and Red Bull, with Lotus and Red Bull essentially even (Red Bull only slightly better, reinforcing Alonso's belief that he could have won with a Lotus in 2012), and in 2013 was again third (closely matched by Mercedes), behind Lotus and Red Bull.) which ultimately proved disappointing as Alonso was able to lead the championship in both 2010 and 2012, despite the 2011–2012 cars only winning three races in total during this period, and ultimately took the inferior machinery to the last round twice (2010 and 2012) but lost both times. In later years, Tombazis explained that the issues were related to the diffuser, which was a key part of the regulations, leading to several discussions among the engine and chassis departments on the right path to follow; however, Ferrari was not able to reach a solution, giving the team and its drivers a disadvantage compared to its main competitors. Notably, Ferrari also suffered in regards to the aerodynamic aspect of the car, accusing a lack of coherence between the data that the Maranello plant provided and the real data obtained on the various tracks.

I have a few traumas in my career that still piss me off; Abu Dhabi in 2010 is at the top of the list. For several months after that race, I had a recurring dream in which someone would come to me and say, "The race has been canceled, we have to start again." Then, unfortunately, I would wake up.

— Nikolas Tombazis

For 2013, Allison was promoted to technical director and he wanted Tombazis to be part of his team. After a good start, the F138 proved to be no match for the Red Bull in 2013. In what was a difficult year, the F14 T was among Ferrari's worst Formula One cars, (Note: The F14 T was the first Ferrari car since 1993 with the Ferrari F93A to have failed to achieve at least one race win as it was badly designed (notably causing both understeer and oversteer) and underpowered, with Alonso's performance compared to those of Senna in 1993 and Schumacher in 1996. As a result, it was ranked sixth by Phillips (behind Force India, McLaren, Williams, Red Bull, and Mercedes), and even as the seventh car in terms of performance (behind Toro Rosso, Force India, McLaren, Red Bull, Williams, and Mercedes) in a 2024 analysis of the 2014–2016 years. Ferrari finished fourth in the Constructors' Championship thanks to Alonso's 14 top six finishes compared to 2 for Räikkönen and 2 podiums to 0, almost winning the 2014 Hungarian Grand Prix.) and this disappointment and lack of success in his second stint at Ferrari led the media and other figures, including Costa as technical director, to question Tombazis, sparking rumours about his likely departure. He left Ferrari on 16 December 2014, as did other key personnel, such as Pat Fry, leading the media to spoke of a revolution within Ferrari. In an August 2014 interview with Leo Turrini, Costa was critical of Tombazsis when he spoke of his own dismissal in May 2011. Costa, who joined Mercedes and was a key designer of the highly successful 2014–2018 Mercedes era that ultimately broke the 1999–2004 Ferrari streak in 2020 and further extended it in 2021, said that he was told he was "the one who was stifling the Greek designer's creativity" and rhetorically asked: "After unleashing his imagination, the results are there for all to see, right?"

In an interview to Corriere della Sera in August 2015, Tombazis revealed his frustration with the dismissal, including that of Alonso, Stefano Domenicali, and Luca di Montezemolo, stating that he did not work much on the F14 T and worked more on its successor, the SF15-T, which was significantly more competitive (it won three races, the only team other than the dominant Mercedes to do so, and Sebastian Vettel was the runner-up when Hamilton won the title, before Nico Rosberg rebounded to second place in the final rounds), and thus he argued that his release appeared to be illogical, making him out as the scapegoat. Moreover, he had expressed concerns about the 2014 project as early as March 2013 in an interview to Autosport, admitting that the development team's move to the Cologne wind tunnel (a facility used by Toyota for its Formula One project), in order to renovate the Maranello wind tunnel, could cause some problems for the work on the 2014 car.

Despite the lack of success in the early 2010s, Tombazis ended his Ferrari career among the most successful designers, and is credited for the dominance of Ferrari in the early 2000s. He later recalled that his best memories where the championship wins in 2000 and 2007 (his first car as chief designer) with Schumacher and Räikkönen, which in his view "stand out", adding that while most of the wins were "very special", these championships had "something extra". He said that the worse moments were "when the car was uncompetitive, losing championships in the last race, retiring from races while leading..." Tombazis recalled the 2010 Abu Dhabi Grand Prix, which saw Ferrari and Alonso losing the title due to a strategy that appeared correct (avoiding the undercut of Alonso's main challenger, who going into the race was Mark Webber) but was ultimately proven to be wrong. Among his major regrets of his second Ferrari stint is that Alonso was not given a better car that would have allowed him to win one or more world titles at Ferrari as in the Schumacher era. He said that Schumacher and Alonso were the best drivers he worked with, stating that while "difficult to compare them" and with "numerous other drivers I enjoyed working with (and most were very good)", their understanding of the car and speed was "on another planet" and Schumacher and Alonso were "something special". A 2022 analysis of chief designers credited him as the 25th most successful designer with three titles (2007–2008) to his name, alongside other designers such as Pierre Waché. When accounting for how many individuals worked on a project, thus earning more points when they were the sole chief designer and so on, Tombazis was ranked 27th with a rating of 1,500, alongside Frank Dernie, Sergio Rinland, and Hans Scherenberg.

=== Manor ===
On 15 January 2016, following a year of gardening leave, the Manor Racing team appointed Tombazis as its chief aerodynamicist, responding to the technical director John McQuilliam. He helped to develop the 2016 car, significantly improving but only obtaining one point at the 2016 Austrian Grand Prix. He also began working on the project for the 2017 car, which was in an advanced status and was reportedly competitive enough to compete more often for points. Following the closure of Manor in March 2017 due to financial issues, just prior to the 2017 season for which Tombazis was working, he set up his own consultancy, called MAA, and was made a visiting professor of aerodynamics for Imperial College London.

== FIA technical and single seater director ==
=== 2022–2025 regulations ===
I am convinced that we will gradually see a convergence of values, which could lead to championships with greater variability in results. There will certainly not be seasons dominated entirely by a single car.

— Nikolas Tombazis, 2021

In 2018, Tombazis joined the FIA as its head of single-seater technical matters, working under the direction of technical director Simon and in collaboration with Charlie Whiting. As a result, he oversaw the regulations that brought back the ground effect to Formula One, with the objective of creating more overtakes, reducing dirty air and allowing the car behind to follow the car in front without losing much downforce, and reducing the impact of tyre wear, allowing the drivers to fight more freely. At the same time, another goal was that of reducing the cost of running a Formula One team, leading to the creation of the budget cap, as well as the removal of removal of some aerodynamics solutions, such as bargeboard and turning vanes, which appeared in the 2010s.

Tombazis was confident that flexi-wings and other grey areas of the regulations would be mitigated. These regulations, which were first outlined in 2019, were scheduled for the 2021 season but were postponed to 2022 due to the COVID-19 pandemic. The regulations achieved mixed results, despite an increase in terms of global popularity, with a significantly less spread out grid and the top teams very close to each other, especially in 2024 and 2025, after a year of domination by Red Bull in 2023. Tombazis later blamed the too many interpretable areas, such as the front wing's outwash, that teams ultimately developed in the opposite direction, leading to the return of dirty air after significant improvements in 2022, and causing "DRS trains".

Despite the expressed hope that the regulations would lead to less polemics, its grey and interpretable areas lead to much controversy, such as the TD39 in 2022 or the flexi-wings in 2024 and 2025. In May 2025, Tombazis said that the 2025 regulations were "designed to counteract the so-called 'mini-DRS effect' that became quite a talking point in the autumn of last year. That test was applied from the start of the season, but it soon became apparent it was insufficient." Moreover, Tombazis admitted that the failure of the regulations also rested in the appearance of porpoising, which was not fully predicted by the teams either and was only reduced in subsequent years, without disappearing. He also said that changes were needed but the teams themselves did not want them. In a December 2025 interview, he reiterated that the 2022–2025 regulations did not fully deliver their promises.

=== 2026 regulations ===
In January 2023, Tombazis was placed in the role of single seater director before the 2023 Formula One season; his previous role was taken up by Tim Gross, while the former single seater director Steve Nielsen reported to him as the sporting director. What would eventually become the 2026 regulations was first discussed in 2020 and was soon the object of controversies among the teams about both the new Formula One power unit, which would see parity between the internal combustion engine (based on sustainable fuel) and the electric engine (an issue that was reportedly raised by the then Red Bull team principal Christian Horner), and active aerodynamics.

Other changes included smaller cars (with a wheelbase reduced to 3,400 mm, the width of the floor reduced by 100 mm to 1.9 m, the Pirelli tyres narrowed, and a weight reduction of 32 kg from 800 kg to 768 kg), the replacement of the DRS with a boost (which is driver-controlled and is available to all drivers anywhere on the track, except when raining) and an overtake button (to be activated in specific track zones if a chasing driver is less than one second behind the car ahead at a designated detection, starting at 180 mph or 290 km/h and contributing, alongside the active aerodynamics, to a higher top speed of 217 mph or 350 km/h) in the designed zone of the track if the car behind is less than one second, the X-mode (low drag) and the Z-mode (high downforce) as part of the new active aerodynamics regulations, and the Additional Development and Upgrade Opportunities (ADUO) system, which is not a balance of performance and is instead mean to help the teams significant behind in terms of engine power to catch up; according to Tombazis, the teams "still have to build the best engine to win" and the ADUO system is not going to "give three points to the guy behind you".

When the 2026 Formula One cars hit the track in the first three Grands Prix of the season, new issues emerged, including underwhelming qualifying, super clipping (the engine significantly slowing down, sometimes losing 25–37 mph or 40–60 km/h, at the end of a straight due to a lack of power when the electric battery is depleted), security issues related to the batteries causing the car to significantly slow down, and the general dissatisfaction of the drivers, most notably Max Verstappen. Moreover, Tombazis had stated in October 2025 that Formula One would be tough on grey areas of the regulations, which some critics felt this was not followed in relation to the Mercedes compression ratio controversy.

In interviews, Tombazis defended the 2026 regulations from increasing criticism, stating that changes to "specific aspects" are needed rather than a full overhaul. Some teams, such as Mercedes (the most competitive team under the new regulations) and Audi (a team, alongside Cadillac, that entered Formula One specifically due to the 2026 regulations, with Honda also returning due to the power units regulations) defended the new regulations, leading Tombazis to say that manufacturers should no longer be allowed to held the power to dictate certain rules; in reference to the 50–50 engine issue, he said that when the 2026 regulations were discussed in a significant different context (for example, it was prior to the 2022 Russian invasion of Ukraine and the global energy crisis), the manufacturers said that they would no longer build internal combustion engines and move towards electrification, which ultimately did not materialise. According to some observers, including higher-ups of Formula E, the FIA reportedly wanted a return to naturally-aspirated engines or a more traditional engine, such as a V8; however, the manufacturers (Mercedes, Honda, and Audi) pushed for the electric engine, with Tombazis stating that they had been too optimistic on its efficiency. By April 2026, modifications aimed to improve qualifying, reduce super clipping, and solve the security issues were adopted ahead of the 2026 Miami Grand Prix.

== Personal life ==
Tombazis lived in Castelnuovo Rangone in the province of Modena, Italy, with his wife and four children. He then moved to Lamia, Greece, for three years in order to complete the national service. Following this period, the Tombazis family moved to Geneva, Switzerland, where he still resides, for his position at the FIA.

== Accomplishments ==
=== Formula One World Championships ===
No.	Seasons	Constructors' Champion	Drivers' Champion	Car	Engine
1	1994 Formula One season	—N/a	Michael Schumacher	B194	Ford
2	1995 Formula One season	Benetton	Michael Schumacher	B195	Renault
3	1999 Formula One season	Ferrari	—N/a	F399	Ferrari
4	2000 Formula One season	Ferrari	Michael Schumacher	F1-2000	Ferrari
5	2001 Formula One season	Ferrari	Michael Schumacher	F2001	Ferrari
6	2002 Formula One season	Ferrari	Michael Schumacher	F2002	Ferrari
7	2003 Formula One season	Ferrari	Michael Schumacher	F2003-GA	Ferrari
8	2007 Formula One season	Ferrari	Kimi Räikkönen	F2007	Ferrari
9	2008 Formula One season	Ferrari	—N/a	F2008	Ferrari

=== Championship-winning cars statistics ===
Season	World Championship		Chassis	Engine	Statistics					
Season	Constructors'	Drivers'	Chassis	Engine	Races	Wins	Poles	F/Laps	Podiums	WCC
1994	Tombazis was head of aerodynamics									
1994	—N/a	(Germany) Michael Schumacher	B194	Ford	16	8	6*	8*	12	2nd
1995	(United Kingdom) Benetton	(Germany) Michael Schumacher	B195	Renault	16	11*	4	8*	15*	1st
1999	Tombazis was chief aerodynamicist									
1999	(Italy) Ferrari	—N/a	F399	Ferrari	16	6	3	6	17	1st
2000	(Italy) Ferrari	(Germany) Michael Schumacher	F1-2000	Ferrari	17	10	10	5	21	1st
2001	(Italy) Ferrari	(Germany) Michael Schumacher	F2001	Ferrari	20	10	13*	3	26	1st
2002	(Italy) Ferrari	(Germany) Michael Schumacher	F2002	Ferrari	19	15*	11	15*	28	1st
2003	(Italy) Ferrari	(Germany) Michael Schumacher	F2003-GA	Ferrari	12	7	5	5	13	1st
2007	Tombazis was chief designer									
2007	(Italy) Ferrari	(Finland) Kimi Räikkönen	F2007	Ferrari	17	9	9	12	22	1st
2008	(Italy) Ferrari	—N/a	F2008	Ferrari	18	8	8	13	19	1st

Notes

Key: (Bold) personal record; (*) constructor record; (†) Formula One record
