= Yannis Kontos =

Greek documentary photographer

Yannis Kontos (Greek: Γιάννης Κόντος) (born 1971) is a Greek documentary photographer, professor of photography and commercial photographer. He has covered major events for over a decade in more than 50 countries. His work has been published in newspapers, magazines, and books.

== Life and work ==
Yannis Kontos was born in Ioannina, Greece in 1971.

From 1988 to 1994, Kontos studied at the Faculty of Physical Education and Sport Science of the University of Thessaloniki. In 1996, he continued studying photography and in 2001, he graduated from the Department of Photography of the School of Graphic Arts and Art Studies at the Technological Educational Institute of Athens. In 2001, after an international competition, he attended the World Press Photo Joop Swart Masterclass in Rotterdam, Netherlands. He made postgraduate studies obtaining a Master of Arts in photographic journalism from the University of Westminster in London, and a PhD degree in Documentary Photography from the University of Wales in Newport, on a Greek state scholarship.

From 1998 to 2000, Kontos worked as a photojournalist for the French agency Sygma. He continued working with the Gamma agency from 2001 to 2002. In 2002, he began working with Polaris Images, producing photojournalism and feature work.

== Publications ==
- Possible/Impossible Aporias. Kastaniotis Editions, 2007. ISBN 978-960-03-4386-1. Foreword by John G. Morris, texts by Penelope Petsini and Thanassis Moutsopoulos.
- Red Utopia. Photographs from North Korea. Kastaniotis, 2007. Text by Thanassis Moutsopoulos. ISBN 978-960-03-4350-2.

== Solo exhibitions ==
- Kabul Photographers Photosynkyria, Thessaloniki, 2004.
- Yannis Kontos: Photojournalist
  - Kythera Photographic Encounters, Kythira 2005.
  - Thessaloniki International Festival of Photography (Photosynkyria), Thessaloniki, 2005.
  - 12th International Month of Photography, Athens, 2005.
  - Foundation for Thracian Art and Tradition, Xanthi, 2005.
- US/Mexico Border Crossing - Canon Exhibition Hall, Visa Pour l’image, Perpignan 2006.
- Possible / Impossible: Aporias, Frissiras Museum, Athens 2007.
- North Korea: Red Utopia, Frissiras Museum, Athens 2007.

== Awards ==
- Runner-up, Life magazine's Alfred Eisenstaedt Awards, News Category, 2000.
- N.P.P.A. The Best of Photojournalism, First Prize, Feature Picture Story, 2001.
- Fujifilm European Press Photographer of the Year, Features, 2004.
- Fujifilm European Press Photographer of the Year, Europe, 2005.
- Fujifilm Euro Press Photo Awards, National winner 1999, 2001, 2003, 2004 & 2006.
- Pictures of the Year, Third Prize, Portrait, 2001.
- Pictures of the Year, Third Prize, Feature Picture, 2003.
- Pictures of the Year International, Award of Excellence, News Picture Story, 1999.
- Pictures of the Year International, Award of Excellence, Global News, 1999.
- Pictures of the Year International, Award of Excellence, Issue Reporting Picture story, 2001.
- UNICEF Photo of the Year Award, Honorable mention, 2001 & 2002.
- Grazia Neri, Yann Geffroy Award, First Prize, 2003.
- National Mental Health Association's Media Awards, First Prize, Photojournalism, 2004.
- 2006: Reader's Award, Days Japan International Photojournalism Awards.
- Pictures of the Year International, First Prize, Magazine Feature Picture, 2006.
- World Press Photo, First Prize, Contemporary Issues Singles, 2006.
