= Alexandros Tombazis =

Greek architect (1939–2024)

- Born: 10 April 1939; New Delhi, British India
- Died: 24 June 2024 (aged 85); Athens, Greece
- Education: National Technical University of Athens
- Occupation: Architect
- Awards: PLEA (Passive and Low Energy Architecture) (1998)
- Buildings: Church of the Santíssima Trindade (Fátima) (2007), Delfoi Museum (2004)

Alexandros Tombazis (Greek: Αλέξανδρος Τομπάζης; 10 April 1939 – 24 June 2024) was a Greek architect. With more than 800 projects – about 300 of them built – and at least 110 prizes gained in competitions, he was one of Greece's most prominent architects.

Tombazis died on 24 June 2024, at the age of 85. His father was the geologist and photographer N. A. Tombazi, while his son is the Formula One designer Nikolas Tombazis.

== Photo gallery - works ==
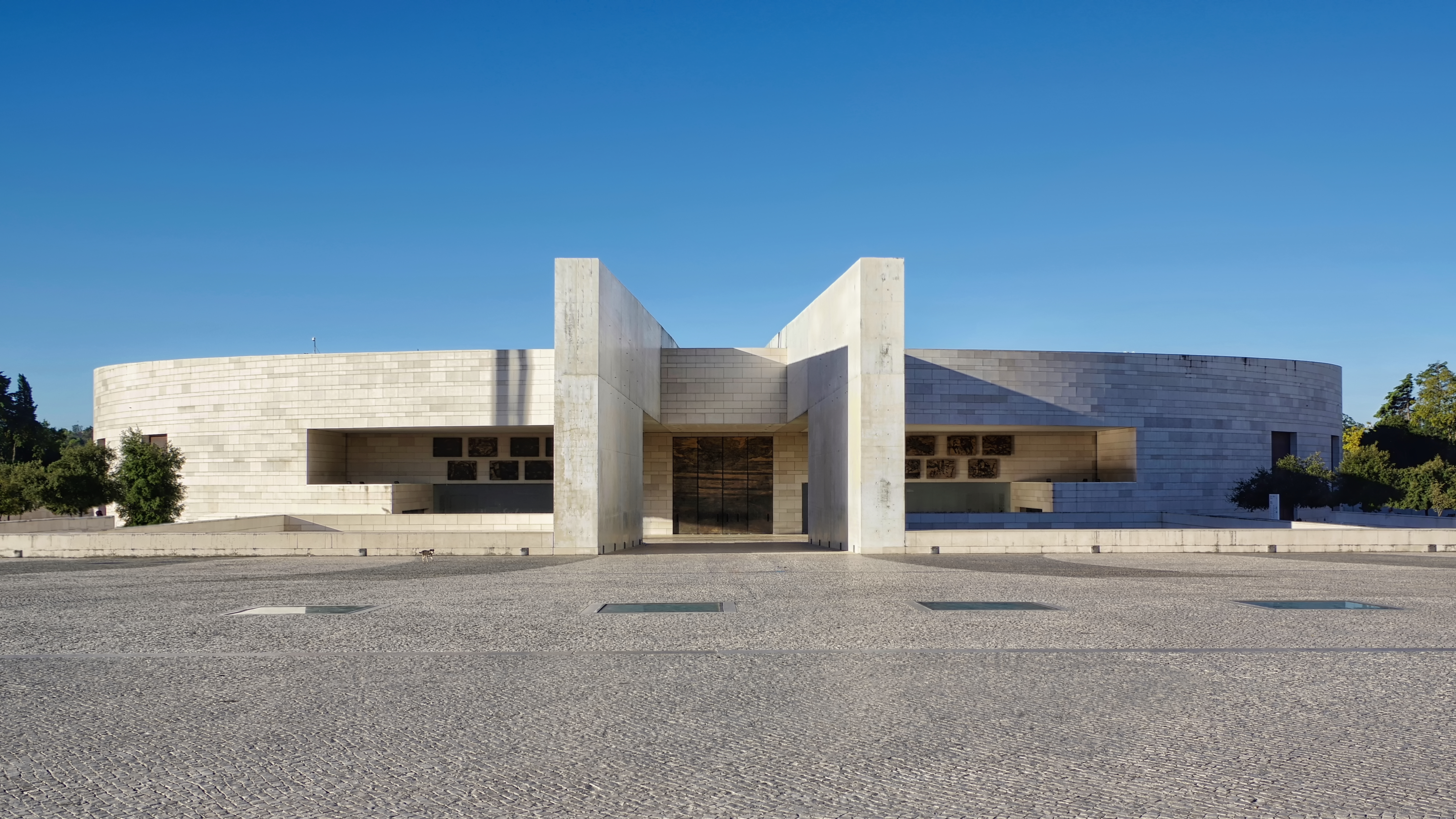
Church of the Santíssima Trindade in Fátima, Portugal

Church of the Santíssima Trindade, interior

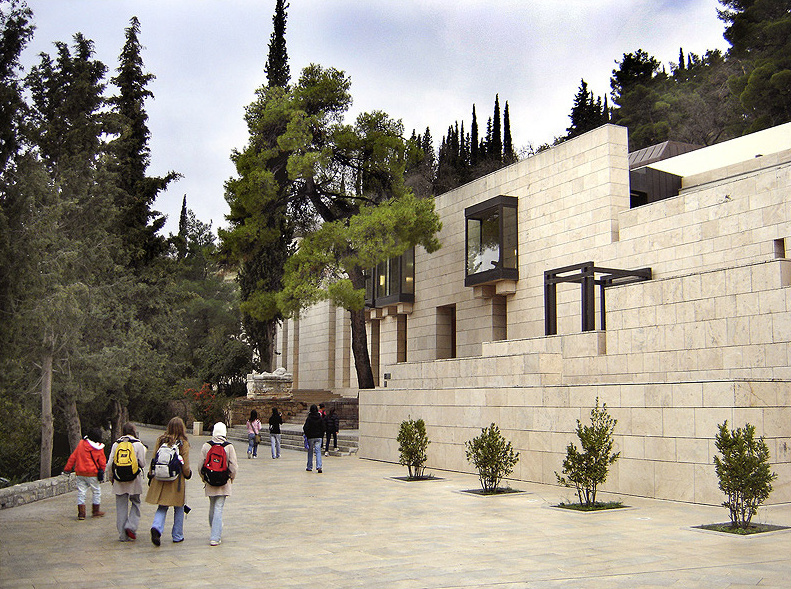
Archaeological museum of Delphi
