= Nelly's =

Greek photographer (1899–1998)

Elli Sougioultzoglou-Seraidari (Greek: Έλλη Σουγιουλτζόγλου-Σεραϊδάρη; 3 November 1899 – 8 August 1998), better known as Nelly's, was a Greek female photographer whose pictures of ancient Greek temples set against sea and sky backgrounds helped shaped the visual image of Greece in the Western mind (or, in a critical reading, the West's visual image of Greece in the Greek mind). There has been some confusion over how exactly she should be referred to. She adopted the diminutive "Nelly" for her professional society portrait work, and its genitive, "Nelly's", was incorporated in her decorative studio stamp, but at no time did she refer to herself as Nelly's; that version of her name was popularised by newspapers at the time of her rediscovery in the 1980s. She is now increasingly referred to, more correctly, as "Elli Seraidari".

== Biography ==
She was born in Aidini (now Aydın), near Smyrna (now İzmir), Asia Minor. She went on to study photography in Germany under Hugo Erfurth and Franz Fiedler, in 1920-1921, before the 1922 expulsion of the ethnic Greeks of Asia Minor by the Turks following the Greco-Turkish war (1919–1922). In 1924, she came to Greece, where she adopted a naive nationalistic and conservative approach to her work. Her style coincided with the Greek state's need to produce an ideal view of the country and its people, for internal as well as external (tourism) purposes. In this respect Souyioultzoglou-Seraidari can be seen as the first Greek "national" advertiser, especially after her appointment as official photographer of the newly established Greek Ministry of Tourism.

At some point she was referred to as "the Greek Leni Riefenstahl" because of her collaboration with the 4th of August Regime (1936–1941), of which she was one of its most prolific photographers. In 1936, she photographed the Berlin Olympic Games. In 1939, she was commissioned with the decoration of the interior of the Greek pavilion at the New York's World Fair, which she did with gigantic collages expressing in an extremely selective manner the physical similarities between ancient and modern Greeks.

As a Greek of the Diaspora, Nelly's view of Greece was nothing less than "idyllic", which matched the propaganda aims of the proto-fascist regime, led by General Ioannis Metaxas. In fact, her work helped illustrate the ideologeme of the racial continuity of the Greeks since Antiquity, which was at the core of Metaxas' agenda (the so-called "Third Hellenic Civilization").

While at New York for the World's Fair in 1939, she decided not to return to Greece. In the United States she continued her commercial photographic portraiture and developed further in advertising photography as well as photo-reportages. She also maintained links with powerful Greeks including shipowners Stavros Niarchos and Aristotle Onassis and developed contacts with the White House. From this period little is known of her work, except from her project "New York Easter Parade" which in retrospective views of her work goes largely unmentioned, as it fails to align with either any previous Greek stereotype or with the continuous developments in the photographic language of her contemporaries.

== Returning to Greece and death ==
She travelled to Greece, for a very short time, in 1949 and finally returned on 2 March 1966 and lived, together with her husband Angelos Seraidaris, at Nea Smyrni, Attica, and gave up photography.

In 1985, Nelly's donated her photo archives and cameras to the Benaki Museum in Athens, while in 1987 she was presented with an honorary diploma and medal by the Hellenic Centre of Photography and the government. In 1993, she was awarded the Order of the Phoenix by the president of the Greek Republic. In 1996, the Athens Academy presented her with its Arts and Letters Award.

Nelly's died in Nea Smyrni, Athens in 1998.
