= Ianna Andreadis =

Greek-origin artist and photographer

Ianna Andreadis (Greek: Γιάννα Ανδρεάδη; born 1960, Athens) is a Greek-origin artist and photographer who has created many books, published in France and Mexico, as well as international projects with worldwide participation. In 2004, she coordinated a digital photo project called The World Around a Flame/Olympic Truce 2004 that was exhibited in Athens during the Olympic Games that year. She is based in France.

== Background, education ==
Between 1978 and 1983, Andreadis studied art, painting and lithography at the National School of Fine Arts in Paris. After travelling through East Africa with publisher Franck Bordas, she created a series of drawings and paintings inspired by these trips.

== Pre-history, excavations ==
Later (1989–90) she studied pre-history in the Institute of Art and Archaeology and joined excavations and surveys in Vallée des Merveilles in the south of France. She has also travelled to pre-historic sites and caves in the Dordogne, in connection with this interest of hers.

Travelling to Zimbabwe, Malawi, Namibia, South Africa in 1993-94, she also created a new series of landscapes, and worked on a number of lithographic limited edition albums, with Franck Bordas.

== Paintings, art books ==
Her 1996-98 work includes a series of paintings of the sea. She has published a series of art books in African wax textile for children. By 2000, while still painting, she embarked on photo and book projects, and created (2003) paintings on the theatrical costumes for the play Titus Andronicus, directed by Simon Abkarian and presented in Chaillot National Theatre.

== Long-term focus on a museum ==
She has also worked on a long-term photo-project for a book, that involves photographing—at regular intervals—stages in the construction of the Quai Branly Museum designed by Jean Nouvel. She has also created (2005) Cosmopolis-Ivry-sur-Seine, a series of portraits of people of different origins living in Ivry-sur-Seine. This has been exhibited in Rhodes, Greece as part of a group exhibition titled Meteques/Foreigners.

== Solo exhibitions ==
Andreadis has put up 12 solo exhibitions in Paris, Saint-Valéry-en-Caux, Belle-île-en-Mer, Uzerche and Athens. She has also taken part in a number of group shows.

During 2006, Andredis completed the book "Chantier Ouvert au Public", which deals with the construction of the Quai Branly Museum, in which she followed the construction of three years of work of an exceptional architectural project by Jean Nouvel. It includes photos of work in progress, workers, everyday life, esthetic and colors, abstract compositions, and tools.

She also completed the book "Dias-Tonaltin", published by Petra Ediciones in Mexico. This book was also printed by the SEP educational program, and circulated in 156,000 copies in schools in Mexico.

Andreadis has been continuing work on Cosmopolis-Ivry-sur-Seine, which is planned to feed into a book, after an exhibition in Rhodes-Greece. This is a series of portraits of inhabitants of foreign inhabitants of Ivry, with one coming from each country, to comprise a total of 60 portraits.

She has also undertaken a project focussed on the Olympic theme of flames, in connection with the Athens Olympics in Greece in 2004.
