= Filippos Margaritis =

Greek photographer

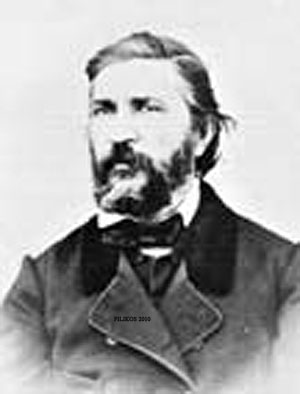
Filippos Margaritis (date unknown)

Philippos Margaritis (Greek: Φίλιππος Μαργαρίτης; 1810 – 1892) was a Greek painter and photographer, born in Smyrna and deceased in Würzburg, Germany. He is widely regarded as the first Greek photographer and one of the pioneers of photography in Greece.

Born in Smyrna to a family of Epirote origin, he studied painting and lithography in Paris and subsequently opened a studio in Athens in 1837 and began teaching at the School of Fine Arts in 1842. He learned the techniques of the daguerreotypes from the French photographer François Perraud (not Philibert) who arrived in Greece in 1847, and in turn passed on his knowledge to the students of Athens Polytechnic around 1850.

Later, he moved on to producing calotypes and albumen prints on paper, including views of the antiquities of Athens as well as formal portraits of Athenian society including members of the courts of King Otto and his successor George I.

He travelled abroad frequently, often to exhibit his work at international exhibitions and fairs. He died in his sister's home in Würzburg on 1 April 1892.
