= Dimitris Yeros =

Greek artist and photographer

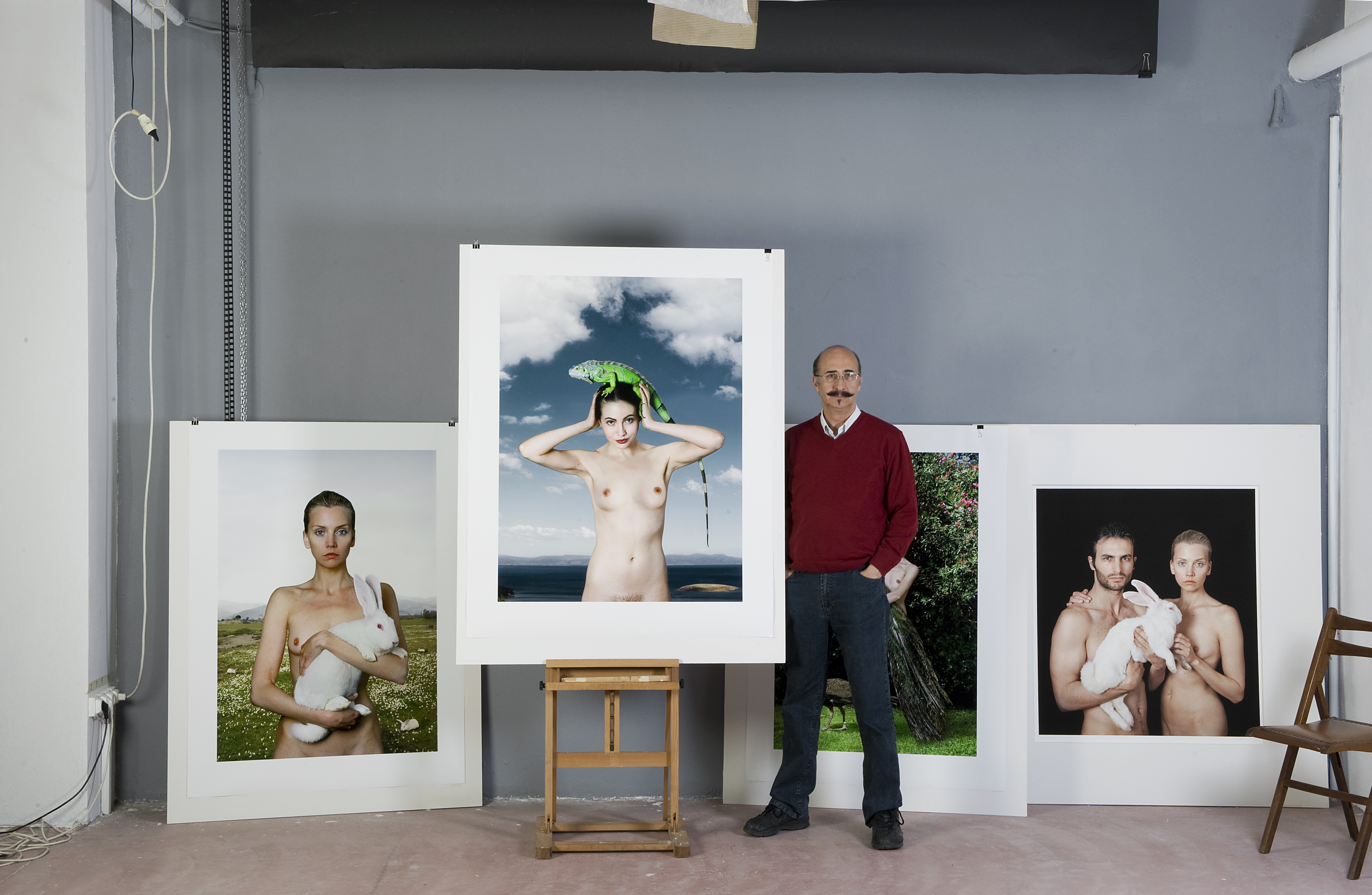
Dimitris Yeros at his studio

Dimitris Yeros (1948) (Eλληνικά - Δημήτρης Γέρος) is a Greek artist-photographer.

Dimitris Yeros is one of the most influential Greek artists of his generation and one of the first Greek artists to present Performances, Body Art, Video Art and Mail Art.

== Exhibitions ==
He has had 58 individual exhibitions of his works held in Greece and abroad: in Köln, Düsseldorf, New York, Kassel, Strasbourg, Bochum (The Bochum Museum), Oxford, England (Oxford University), Darmstadt, Indiana (Ball State University Art Gallery), Heidelberg, Nicosia, Mannheim, Milan, Ann Arbor, Michigan (Kelsey Museum of Archaeology), Berlin, Mexico City, Museo de Arte Moderno de Barranquilla-Colombia, Taipei-Taiwan and elsewhere. He has also participated in numerous international group exhibitions, Biennials and Triennials in many parts of the world.

== Published works ==
Many of his graphics have been published by leading art editors. He illustrated books and magazines. In 1987, UNICEF chose his work The Dangers of Curiosity to print on cards for international circulation. The following books with his works have been published: the collection The Sparkling Bathtub (Kastaniotis Ed., 1976); the photo series Photopoem (Phyllo, 1977); the art book Yeros with text by Yannis Patilis (Phorkys, 1984); Dimitris Yeros, a book-catalogue of painting works (The Bochum Museum, 1986); Dimitris Yeros, a book of painting works with an essay by Professor Chrysanthos Christou (Prefecture of Boeotia, 1998); Theory of the Nude, a book of photographs with an introduction by Peter Weiermair (Planodion, 1998); Periorasis, a book of photographs with a foreword by Michel Deon and an introduction by Pierre Devin (Phyllo, 1999); For a Definition of the Nude, a book of photographs with an introduction by Peter Weiermair (Phyllo, 2000); Dimitris Yeros; a book of painting works Eyemazing - The New Collectible Art Photography with an essay by John Wood (Ermoupolia 2001); Dimitris Yeros on C.P. Cavafy's poems, Kelsey Museum, Ann Arbor, Michigan. With an assay by Lauren E. Talalay (2002); DIMITRIS YEROS, Calendar (Harta Publications, Greece, 2007); Wavelength: Dimitris Yeros and Sarantis Karavouzis with an assay by Athena Schina (Kydonieos Foundation, Greece, 2008); Dimitris Yeros, Calendar (Harta publications. Greece, 2008); Shades of Love with foreword by Edward Albee and introduction by John Wood (Insight Editions, 2010); Dimitris Yeros, Photographing Gabriel García Márquez, with foreword by Edward Lucie Smith and afterword by Dimitris Yeros (Kerber Verlag, Germany 2015); Another Narcissus, with a poem by Edward Albee and introduction by John Wood (Phyllo Editions, Greece 2016).

In 2010, Insight Editions-California published the book Shades of Love with photographs, inspired by the poems of Constantine P. Cavafy with a foreword by Edward Albee and introduction by John Wood. The book is honored by American Library Association (ALA) and featured on their Top 10 list as one of the best books of the year.

== Documentaries ==
In 2019 he made the documentary Ovil and Usman, lasting 47 minutes. It has been screened at various festivals. In 2021 he made the documentary A Lesbos Diary, lasting 25 minutes. In 2021, ERT2 TV —part of the Hellenic Broadcasting Corporation— made a 30-minute documentary about his life and his work.

== Works in collections ==
Numerous works by Dimitris Yeros are to be found in many private collections, national galleries and museums worldwide: Tate Britain, International Center of Photography (New York), National Portrait Gallery, London, The British Museum (London), Kunstmuseum Bochum (Germany), Musée des beaux-arts de Montréal (Canada), Museo de Arte Moderno de Barranquilla, National Gallery (Athens), The Cohen Family Collection (New York), Maison Européenne de la Photographie, Tama Art University Museum (Tokyo), Norwegian Museum of Contemporary Art (Oslo), Musée d'Art Contemporain de Chamalières (France), New Hampshire Institute of Art (Boston), The Leslie-Lohman Museum of Art (New York), Harry Ransom Center (Austin, Texas), Fondazione Benetton (Italy), Benaki Museum (Athens), and elsewhere.

== Bibliography ==
- "Dimitris Yeros Shades of Love", by Clayton Maxwell. Eyemazing magazine, Spring 2012
- Another Narcissus. OUT magazine. August 2016
- "Dimitris Yeros Shades of Love". Le journal de la photographie
- Miami Herald, April 12, 2012. Photo collection "Shades of Love" by Dimitris Yeros, intro by Edward Albee.
- Time Out, New York, October 22, 2015. Medium of Desire
- Hyperallergic magazine, February 2, 2016. Medium of Desire, by Zachary Small
- Musee magazine, Dec. 22, 2015. Medium of Desire
- Odyssey magazine. Books: Shades of Love, Photographs Inspired by the Poems of C.P. Cavafy. By Vivienne Nilan. Jan-Feb. 2011
- L’oeil de la Photographie. Edward Albee and Dimitris Yeros Another Narcissus. December 2, 2016
- The Quarterly Review “Harbours hitherto unseen” – the charm of Constantine Cavafy, by Derek Turner. March 25, 2013
- Η ΦΑΝΤΑΣΙΑ ΤΟΥ ΓΕΡΟΥ, ΣΥΝΕΝΤΕΥΞΗ ΣΤΟΝ Χρήστο Νικολόπουλο
- BHMAGAZINO 13 March 2016
- La fortuna de retratar a García Márquez, El Universal, 9-12-2015
- Inauguran exposición con imágenes de Dimitris Yeros, La Jornada 10-12-2015
- EL HERALDO - Dimitris Yeros, el griego que retrató a Gabo, 27-11-2015
- THE OPÉRA, Vol. IV 2015
- New Light on the Magical Realist, by Derek Turner, Quarterly Review, 4-7-2015
- Tribute to “Gabo” by Greek photographer Dimitris Yeros. By Olga Sella,
- Kathimerini 27-5-2015
- Mi amigo Gabo, El Universal, 19-4-2015
- El amigo griego que retrato a Gabo en su intimidad, by Gerardo Martinez. El Universal 17-4-2015
- Gabriel Garcia Marquez by Dimitris Yeros. By Jaqueline Flynn. Musee magazine 12-5-2015
- THE NAKED AND THE NUDE, BY GRAFICHE DELL'ARTIERE
- New Yorker Magazine, by Vince Alleti, 9-7-2012
- Shades of Love. Photographs inspired by the poems of C. P. Cavafy. By Richard Schneider. The gay and lesbian review worldwide, Sep-Oct. 2011
- Shades of Love. Photographs inspired by the poems of C. P. Cavafy. By Jain
- Kelly. Focus magazine, spring 2012
- Shades of Love. Photographs inspired by the poems of C. P. Cavafy. By Ara H. Merjian. Afterimage magazine, 1-1-2012
- Shades of Love. By Raef Harrison, OUT magazine, 28-11-2011
- Dimitris Yeros, by Cristina Franzoni. Zoom magazine, July 2011
- Vernissage magazine, Septembre 2008
- Art World, Oct-Nov. 2007
- Blue magazine, Jan. 2004
- Naked Truth - Proto Thema, 14-8-2015
- Photoshooting Marquez, by Helen Bistica, kathimerini, 7-6-2015
- The Greek who photographed Marquez, by Olga Sella, Kathimerini 16-5-2015
- The Greek friend of G. G. Marquez. By Marinos Vithoulkas. People Magazine - Proto Thema 26-4-2015
- Famous people of Mexico: Photonet magazine January 2012 issue
- Deco-Tachydromos, Fall 2007
- Maison and Decoration, Greek edition, issue No 76
- Eleftheros Typos, by Eugenia Kaltezioti, 17-8-2008
- David Leddick,Male Nude Now, New Visions for the 21st Century, Universe Ed, 2001, page 70.
- Evangelos Andreou, D. Yeros-The "myth" of a synthetic extravagant. “Katoikia” Magazine, is. 16 – Athens 1984
- Edward Lucie-Smith, Gods Becoming Men, Fryssiras Museum, 2004, pages 15,76-79,96.
- 21st The Journal of Contemporary Photography, Volume VI, Flesh & Spirit, 2004, pages 203- 207.
- Edward Lucie Smith, Erotica.The Fine Art of Sex, Ivy Press Ltd. 1997, reprinted Moscow 2004, page 27.
- James Spada, The Romantic Male Nude, Abrams, New York, 2007, plates 56, 75, 130, 156, page 159.
- “OK” magazine, ΔΗΜΗΤΡΗΣ ΓΕΡΟΣ 17-7-2021
- Revista Noche Labertino, 5th edition, 2018
- ARA H. MERJIAN "Classicism Subverted" Paris April–May 2005
- Eleftheros Typos, 24-5-20
- Athena Schina: Man is the dream of a shadow, 2017
- "Harbours hitherto unseen" – The charm of Constantine Cavafy March 25, 2013 by Derek Turner
- Ζέτα Τζιώτη. Εφημερίδα ΑΞΙΑ, Σάββατο 15 Μαρτίου 2020. Δημήτρης Γέρος: «Τρέχω να προλάβω να τα ζωγραφίσω όλα»
- Γιάννης Κοντός: Ο Καβάφης και τα σώματα. 2015
- Σάββας Χριστοδουλίδης, ΙΣΤΟΡΙΕΣ ΕΝΟΣ ΝΗΝΕΜΟΥ ΚΑΙΡΟΥ. Κύπρος 17-11-2014
- Derek Turner, New lights on the magical realist, quarterly review, 2016
- Dominique Nahas, Happenstance and Reverie in the Works Dimitris Yeros, 2020
- Edmund White, The Big Solitary Man, May 2011
- Michel Déon: Artist Dimitris Yeros
- NEON magazine: Dimitris Yeros, Shades of Love...in the Time of Cholera, June 2016
- Πλάτων Ριβέλης: Η αλήθεια τού φωτογραφικού γυμνού (D. Yeros, Θεωρία Γυμνού, Πλανόδιον) Ta Nea 1999
- Vicki Goldberg: The Persistence of History, The Insistence of Time. Assay for the catalogue of the exhibition A Lesbos Diary, Throckmorton gallery. New York
- Quentin Crisp: On the book Theory of The Nude. New York 2000
- Yannis Kontos: THE DARK WAFT OF AIR AND THE FREEDOM OF THE SKY IN THE PAINTINGS OF DIMITRIS YEROS, 2015
- DIMITRIS YEROS, Sense and Sensibility, by Lauren E. Talalay
- Acting Director and Associate Curator, Kelsey Museum University of Michigan.
- Peter Weiermair: About man and animal, On the new works of Dimitris Yeros
- One of us, by Richard Howard, May 2011
- Dimitris Yeros-Gao Yuan: Colors of Passion.The New York Photo Review, By R. Wayne Parsons, July 4–17, 2012
- The Exuberant Flowering of Dimitris Yeros, by John Wood
- Paul LaRosa: Chiseled Tableaus: The Nudes of Dimitris Yeros
- Dimitris Yeros – PERIORASIS, by Pierre Devin. Fιvrier 1999
