= N. A. Tombazi =

Greek geologist and photographer (1894–1986)

N.A. Tombazi (Greek: Νικόλαος Τομπάζης, romanized: Nikólaos Tompázis; 1894–1986) was a Greek photographer who on a British Geological Expedition in 1925 apparently sighted a Yeti creature at 15,000 feet in the Himalayas of Tibet.

== Early life ==
Tombazi was born in 1894 in St Petersburg, Russia, where his father served as Ambassador in the Greek Embassy, although his birth was registered in Hydra, the family home. Tombazi was educated in Greece and served his military service in the Balkan Wars. He was employed by the Ralli Brothers' trading company and worked mainly in their Calcutta office. After working with the firm for over 30 years he returned to Greece in 1946, taking up residence in Athens, and became a professional photographer.

== Career ==
Described as "an adventurer in life and art", Tombazi's main outside interests were photography and mountaineering, alongside others such as fishing and breeding pedigree dogs. His love of photography and climbing were motivated at an early age after he received his first camera, a Box Brownie No 2 that he took on tours of archaeological sites and treks in the mountains of Greece from the age of 16. He would later climb in the Himalayas and the Swiss Alps, which he photographed extensively, as well as recording his mountain expeditions. In the archive of the Royal Geographical Society, of which he was a member, Tombazi is recorded as “candidate for Everest Expedition, photographer and traveller”.

Tombazi was a member of the Royal Photographic Society in London, the Fédération de l'Art Photographique of Switzerland and treasurer of the Photographic Society of Calcutta. His second career as a photographer led to him returning to his first love of photographing archaeological sites and excavations. Working in collaboration with the Archaeological Society he recorded the excavations by the archaeologists Takis Theocharis at the Askitario site at Rafina and Yannis Papadimitriou at Brauron and Merenda and he became known as one of the best photographers in the field. This led to him working for the Greek National Tourism Organization and with Christian Zervos for his magazine Cahiers d'art.

In 1962 Tombazi visited Mount Athos and took a series of photographs of the architecture and art of the monasteries as well as recording the daily life of the monks in the Athonite community. In 1982, a selection of the Mount Athos photographs was displayed at the British Council, in an exhibition entitled Nikolaos Tombazis: An Exhibition of Photographs of Mount Athos. Photographs of Mount Athos taken by Tombazi are also held in the Conway Library at The Courtauld Institute of Art, whose archive, of primarily architectural images, is being digitised under the wider Courtauld Connects project. A more recent exhibition of his work, Nikolaos Tombazis (1894-1986) India-Greece, was shown in the Benaki Museum in 2005.

Tombazi died in 1986 and his family, which includes his son (the architect Alexandros Tombazis) and his grandson (the Formula One car designer and FIA single-seater director Nikolas Tombazis), donated his archive of over 30,000 negatives and a large number of original prints to the Benaki Museum. Photographs by Tombazi are also held by the J. Paul Getty Museum.

== Yeti sighting ==
In 1925, Tombazi recorded a potential sighting of a Yeti, a "tall, naked figure tugging at rhododendron bushes", at 15,000 feet (4,500m) in Nepal. Tombazi did not believe in the yeti, thinking the figure he saw was a traveling hermit. In 1925, he wrote a book about his experiences called Account of a Photographic Expedition to the Southern Glaciers of Kangchenjunga in the Sikkim Himalaya. He recounted: "Unquestionably, the figure in outline was exactly like a human being, walking upright and stopping occasionally to uproot or pull at some dwarf rhododendron bushes. It showed up dark against the snow and as far as I could make out, wore no clothes." About two hours later, Tombazi and his companions descended the mountain, and saw what appeared to be the creature's footprints, described as "similar in shape to those of a man, but only six to seven inches long by four inches wide. ... The prints were undoubtedly those of a biped."
