= Vassilis Makris =

Greek photographer (born 1958)

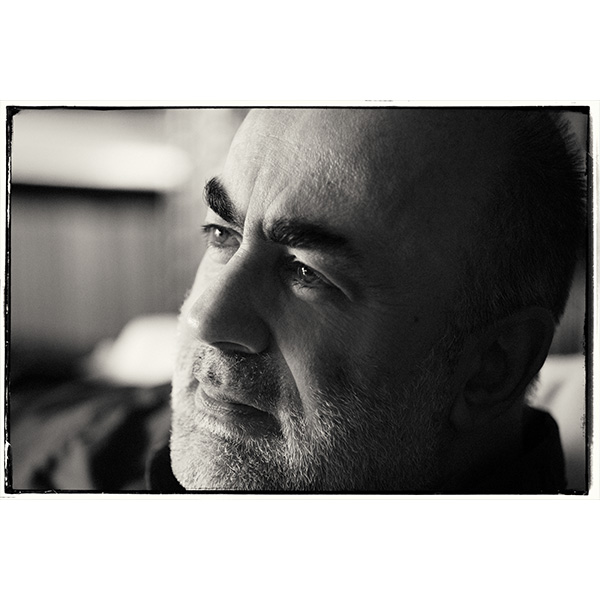
Vassilis Makris

Vassilis Makris (Greek: Βασίλης Μακρής, born 1958) is a Greek photographer.

== Life and work ==
Makris was born in Patras, Greece. He started working as a professional photographer in 1985, initially focusing on stage photography. In 1987, he visited New York City and photographed various museums and historical buildings. Drawn by the subject, he switched his specialization to architectural photography and in 1989, started shooting private residences and interior spaces in Los Angeles, USA. It was then that he launched his long-term association with Greek and international publishing organizations. During this period he also photographed concerts by Vangelis in Athens, Paris, Rome and Rotterdam at the artist’s request.

2002 saw the publishing of his first coffee table photo book "Houses in Greece - Under the sun" (Σπίτια στην Ελλάδα - Κάτω απ’ τον ήλιο) a collection of interiors from private residences throughout Greece. The following year he published the photo album "The Face of Athens" (Το πρόσωπο της Αθήνας), a photographic and architectural record of the city of Athens, in cooperation with journalist Nikos Vatopoulos.

In 2009, he represented Greece at FotoWeek DC (Washington DC, USA) with his participation in the ‘What Lies Beneath: Nature and Urban Landscape in EU Photography’ exhibition, along with 19 other photographers from Europe.

From 2005 to 2010, he taught various courses on the principles of architectural and industrial photography at the Leica Academy of Creative Photography in Athens.

Between 2010 and 2012, he was a member of the editorial team, chief photo editor and photo content manager of the op-ed web site protagon.gr.

He has been a member of the Greek Union of Film, Television and Audiovisual Technicians (ΕΤΕΚΤ-ΟΤ) since 1988, as a Still Photographer, and of PHOEBUS, the Greek Organization for the Collective Management and Protection of the Intellectual Property Rights of Photographers.

In 2011 he started working closely with the Onassis Cultural Centre – Athens, a new cultural space hosting events and actions across the spectrum of the arts, as well as the National Theater of Greece and the National Opera of Greece, photographing show rehearsals and performances, in support of the arts and culture of a nation in crisis.

In June 2015 he participated in the 4-day “Light Up the Night” event at the Stavros Niarchos Park with a one-man show, presenting 16 photographs from the “Incarnation” project, a work in progress that was completed in 2017 on the central stage of the opera house at the Stavros Niarchos Foundation Cultural Center.

In May 2016 he mounted the "Damni i colori...The making of" exhibition at the visitor center of the Stavros Niarchos Foundation Cultural Center (SNFCC). The photographs depict the preparatory stages of Isma Toulatou's “Opera and Fashion” project, offering the public an opportunity to vicariously experience and take part in the rehearsals and backstage action of the project, which was presented on May 19, 2016 at the Greek National Opera’s Olympia Theater.

In 2017, while continuing to pursue his professional career, he returned to the Leica Academy Greece, where he taught architectural and industrial photography and led workshops and masterclasses, until 2024.

== Publications ==
- Σπίτια στην Ελλάδα - Κάτω απ’ τον ήλιο = Houses in Greece - Under the Sun. Potamos, 2002. ISBN 960-7563-91-3.
- Το πρόσωπο της Αθήνας = The Face of Athens. Potamos, 2003. ISBN 960-7563-99-9. With Nikos Vatopoulos.
  - English edition, 2004.
  - Second edition, 2008.
- Εισαγωγή στην αρχιτεκτονική φωτογραφία = Introduction to Architectural Photography. Leica Academy Greece, 2021. ISBN 978-618-84177-1-7.
