= Leonidas Papazoglou =

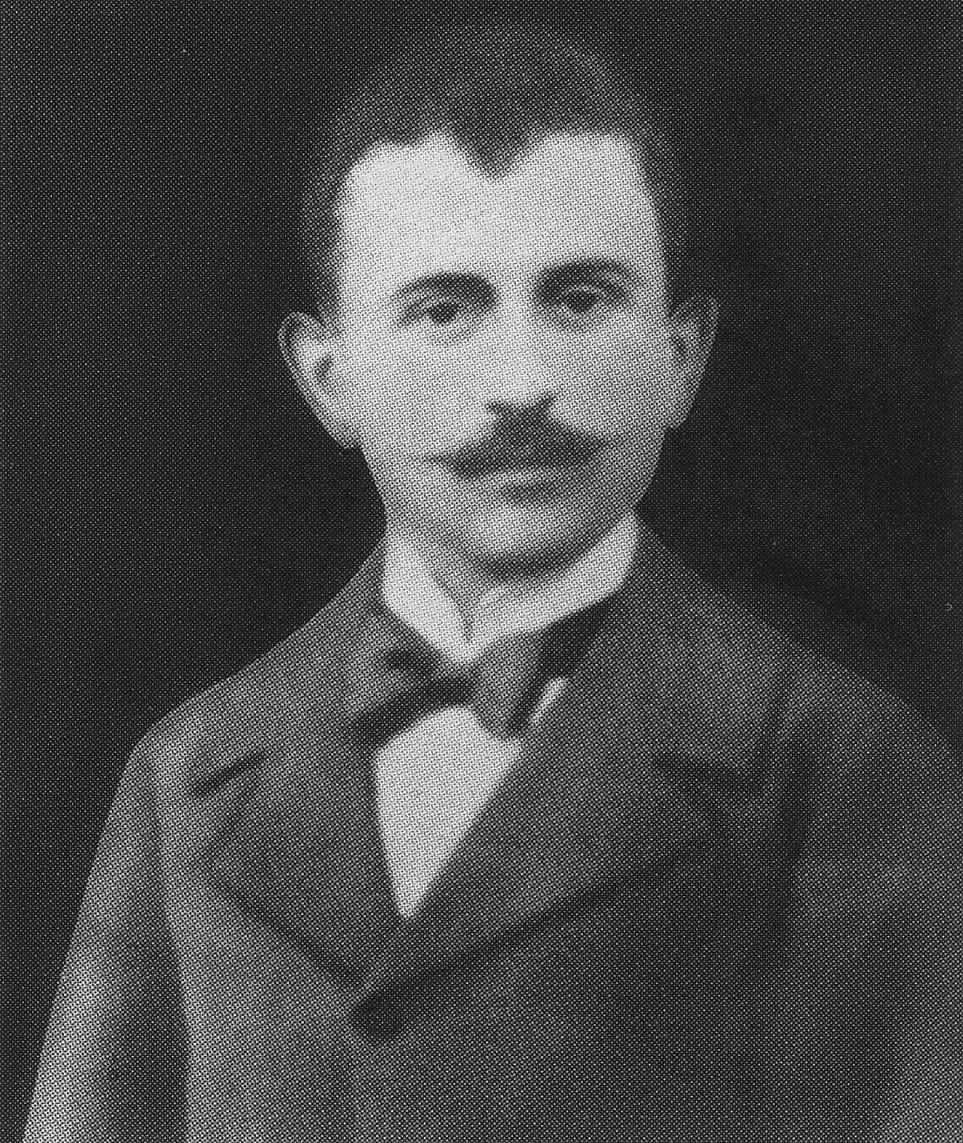
- Selfportrait
- Born: 1872; Kastoria, Greece
- Died: 1918 (aged 46)
- Occupation: Photographer

Leonidas Papazoglou (Greek: Λεωνίδας Παπάζογλου, 1872–1918) was a Greek photographer of Macedonia, at the end of the 19th till the early 20th century.

== Biography ==
Papazoglou was born in the city of Kastoria in 1872. He left with his parents and his younger brother, Pantelis, for Istanbul, where he studied photography. After their parents' death, the brothers returned in Kastoria. They opened their first photographic studio there, and managed to monopolize photography in the whole region since the very beginning of their activity. Papazoglou brothers were the first Kastoria-born photographers of the town, whose photographic needs in the preceding period, had been met irregularly by itinerant, non-Kastorian photographers.

Leonidas Papazoglou died in 1918 at the age of 46, affected by the Spanish influenza epidemic, which plagued Macedonia at the time.
