= Voltan (disambiguation) =

Voltan is a Maya god.

Voltan may also refer to:

- Luigi Voltan, a shoe company
- Voltan, the villain of Hawk the Slayer
- Voltan, adjective form of Volta

== See also ==
- Votan, another Maya god with a similar name
- Vultan
