= Grill the Grid =

- Genre: Entertainment
- Created by: Formula One group
- Original language: English
- No. of seasons: 10

Original release
- Release: 2016 – present

Grill the Grid is a recurring digital quiz and entertainment series produced by Formula One Group, featuring the drivers of Formula One. First introduced in 2016, the series presents drivers with trivia-based and visual challenges related to Formula One.

== Format ==
This series is done in a yearly structure that consists of short episodes, released via Formula One's official platforms. In each episode, drivers are challenged to complete tasks within time limits. These include naming race winners alphabetically, spotting altered images, identifying circuits, and answering geography trivia.

Points are earned based on the performance of the drivers in each challenge, with cumulative scores that determine the overall winner by the end of the season. Participants are from the current Formula One grid for that particular season.

== Production and release ==
Grill the Grid is produced during a Formula One season, often alongside race weekends or during calendar breaks. The series is distributed primarily on the Formula One YouTube channel.

== Winners ==
The list of winners by year is listed below.

List of Grill the Grid winners (2016 and onwards)
Year	Winner	Team	Ref
2016	(United Kingdom) Jolyon Palmer	Renault Sport F1 Team	
2017	(Russia) Daniil Kvyat and (Spain) Carlos Sainz Jr.	Scuderia Toro Rosso	
2018	(Italy) Maurizio Arrivabene	Scuderia Ferrari	
2019	(Netherlands) Max Verstappen and (Thailand) Alex Albon	Red Bull Racing	
2020	No official winner listed		
2021	(Germany) Sebastian Vettel	Aston Martin	
2022	(Monaco) Charles Leclerc	Scuderia Ferrari	
2023	(Spain) Carlos Sainz Jr.	Scuderia Ferrari	
2024	(Australia) Oscar Piastri	McLaren	
2025	(Australia) Oscar Piastri	McLaren	
2026	(Australia) Oscar Piastri	McLaren	

== Episode list ==
=== Grill the Grid 2021 ===
No.	Title	Ref.	Original release date
1	"Teams A-Z"		May 28, 2021
2	"Geography"		June 14, 2021
3	"Driver Numbers"		July 9, 2021
4	"Name Every F1 World Champion"		August 6, 2021

=== Grill the Grid 2022 ===
No.	Title	Ref.	Original release date
1	"Driver Heights!"		May 14, 2022
2	"First Corners"		June 4, 2022
3	"Higher or Lower"		July 16, 2022
4	"A-Z Tracks"		August 13, 2022

=== Grill the Grid 2023 ===
No.	Title	Ref.	Original release date
1	"A-Z Race Winners Challenge!"		August 2, 2023
2	"Youngest to Oldest Challenge!"		August 9, 2023
3	"Who's That Quote About Challenge!"		August 16, 2023
4	"Name Two Drivers Challenge!"		August 23, 2023
5	"F1 Drivers as Babies!"		August 30, 2023
6	"Geography Challenge!"		September 6, 2023

=== Grill the Grid 2024 ===
No.	Title	Ref.	Original release date
1	"The Face Mash Challenge"		July 31, 2024
2	"The A-Z Challenge"		August 7, 2024
3	"Spot the Mistake Challenge"		August 14, 2024
4	"Earliest F1 Winners Challenge"		August 21, 2024
5	"Who Am I Challenge"		August 28, 2024
6	"Name Two Drivers Challenge"		September 4, 2024

=== Grill the Grid 2025 ===
No.	Title	Ref.	Original release date
1	"The Face Mash Challenge"		August 6, 2025
2	"The Mystery Track Challenge!"		August 13, 2025
3	"Spot the Mistake"		August 20, 2025
4	"Badly Described Races Challenge"		August 27, 2025

=== Grill the Grid 2026 ===
No.	Title	Ref.	Original release date
1	"Guess the Driver by Team Career!"		July 30, 2026
2	"The 0-99 Challenge!"		August 6, 2026
3	"Driver Puzzle Challenge!"		August 13, 2026
4	"World Champions Challenge!"		August 20, 2026

== Grill the Grid results ==
=== Grill the Grid 2025 ===
Winner
2nd Place
3rd Place

Championship standings by round
Pos.	Driver	Rounds				Total
Pos.	Driver	Round 1 Face Mash	Round 2 Mystery Track	Round 3 Spot the Mistake	Round 4 Badly Described Races	Total
1	Oscar Piastri	46	12	15	18	91
2	Oliver Bearman	44	12	14	13	83
3	Alexander Albon	46	12	15	7	80
4	Isack Hadjar	37	12	14	14	77
5	Lando Norris	43	12	15	5	75
6	Charles Leclerc	30	12	15	10	67
7	Nico Hülkenberg	34	12	15	3	64
7	Esteban Ocon	31	12	15	6	64
9	Carlos Sainz Jr.	23	10	13	14	60
10	Pierre Gasly	29	12	13	5	59
10	Gabriel Bortoleto	28	11	12	8	59
12	Max Verstappen	16	12	14	15	57
13	Kimi Antonelli	25	12	14	5	56
14	George Russell	17	10	15	11	53
15	Lewis Hamilton	14	11	13	2	40
16	Fernando Alonso	21	12	15	5	38
17	Lance Stroll	14	11	10	1	36

=== Grill the Grid 2026 ===
Winner
2nd Place
3rd Place

Championship standings by round
Pos.	Driver	Rounds				Total
Pos.	Driver	Round 1 Guess the Driver by Team Career	Round 2 The 0-99 Challenge	Round 3 Driver Puzzle Challenge	Round 4 World Champions Challenge	Total
1	Oscar Piastri	22	35	22	48	127
2	Isack Hadjar	16	24	20	63	123
3	Kimi Antonelli	16	26	16	62	120
4	Max Verstappen	21	28	22	47	118
5	George Russell	22	27	17	47	113
6	Oliver Bearman	16	27	22	46	111
6	Pierre Gasly	18	36	11	46	111
8	Alexander Albon	20	28	15	44	107
8	Franco Colapinto	17	24	22	44	107
10	Gabriel Bortoleto	18	25	15	48	106
11	Liam Lawson	15	30	14	41	100
12	Arvid Lindblad	12	21	15	48	96
13	Charles Leclerc	15	23	16	35	89
14	Lando Norris	12	21	17	38	88
14	Carlos Sainz Jr.	18	17	11	42	88
16	Nico Hülkenberg	17	19	10	37	83
17	Esteban Ocon	15	19	10	37	81
18	Sergio Pérez	19	11	10	39	79
19	Valtteri Bottas	11	14	9	39	73
20	Lewis Hamilton	12	8	18	-	38
21	Fernando Alonso	14	-	17	-	31
