= Arrivabene =

Arrivabene is a surname. Notable people with the surname include:

- Giovanni Arrivabene (1787–1881), Italian politician and economist
- Giulio Cesare Arrivabene (1806–1896), Italian painter
- Maurizio Arrivabene (born 1957), Italian car racing team manager
- Opprandino Arrivabene (1807–1887), Italian journalist and patriot
