= Voltaic =

Voltaic may refer to:

- Alessandro Volta (1745–1827), Italian physicist, chemist, and electricity pioneer
  - Voltaic pile, the first electrical battery
- Electricity from an electrochemical cell or battery
- Voltaïc, releases from Björk's album, Volta
- Volta River, a river in west Africa
- Upper Volta, a colony and nation now known as Burkina Faso
- Gur languages, a subfamily of Atlantic-Congo languages formerly known as the Voltaic languages

== See also ==
- Volta (disambiguation)
- List of forms of electricity named after scientists
