= Volta =

Volta may refer to:

== Persons ==
- Alessandro Volta (1745–1827), Italian physicist and inventor of the electric battery, count and eponym of the volt
- Giovanni Volta (1928–2012), Italian Roman Catholic bishop
- Giovanni Serafino Volta (1764–1842) Italian priest, naturalist and paleontologist
- Massimo Volta (born 1987), Italian footballer
- Leopoldo Camillo Volta (1751–1823) Italian librarian and historian of Mantua

== Places ==
- Volta, California, a census-designated place in Merced County, California, US
- Volta Mantovana, an Italian municipality in the Lombardy region
- Porta Volta, a former city gate of Milan, Italy
- Volta Grande, a Brazilian municipality in the Minas Gerais state
- Volta Redonda, a Brazilian municipality in the Rio de Janeiro state
- Upper Volta, the former name of Burkina Faso
- Lake Volta, in Ghana
- Volta Region, in Ghana
- Volta River, primarily flowing in Ghana, with its headstreams:
  - White Volta
  - Red Volta
  - Black Volta
- Volta (crater), a crater on the Moon
- 8208 Volta, a main belt asteroid

== Technology and products ==
- Volta (microarchitecture), the initial codename for the microarchitecture to succeed the Pascal (microarchitecture) developed by Nvidia
- Volta Charging, American electric vehicle infrastructure company
- Toyota Alessandro Volta, a hybrid concept vehicle
- Volta, a brand of vacuum cleaners by Electrolux

== Organisations ==
- GoVolta, Dutch railway company
- Volta Laboratory and Bureau, research and philanthropic institutions created by Alexander Graham Bell in the US
- Volta Aluminum Company, a company based in Ghana
- Volta River Authority, the main electricity supplier in Ghana
- Volta Regional Museum, an ethnographic history museum in Ho, Ghana
- Volta Cinematograph, first cinema of Dublin. started by, among others, James Joyce
- Volta Trucks, an electric truck manufacturer
- Volta (Estonian company), factory in Tallinn, Estonia

== Sports ==
- Volta a Portugal, an annual professional road bicycle race in Portugal
- Volta ao Algarve, an annual road bicycle racing stage race in the Algarve, Portugal
- Volta a Catalunya, an annual professional road bicycle race in Catalonia, Spain
- Volta a Lleida, a road cycling stage race held in the Lleida region of Spain
- Volta a la Comunitat Valenciana, a former road cycling stage race held in the Valencian Community, Spain
- Volta Feminina da República, a Brazil women's staged cycle race
- Volta ao Distrito de Santarém, an annual Portuguese road bicycle racing stage race in the Santárem district

== Other uses ==
- Volta (album), a 2007 album by Björk
- Volta (dance), a Renaissance dance for couples
- Volta (literature), a point of dramatic change in a poem
- Una Volta, the 3rd album from the band DeVotchKa
- Volta (film), a 2004 Philippine movie
- Volta (TV series), a 2008 Philippine TV series based on its namesake 2004 movie
- Volta (Brescia Metro), a railway station in Brescia, Italy
- Volta Review, the journal of the Alexander Graham Bell Association for the Deaf and Hard of Hearing
- Volta bracket, a musical repeat sign
- Volta potential, difference in potential in electrochemistry
- Volta Prize, an award by the French government for scientific achievement in electricity
- Edison Volta Prize, a biannual award by the European Physical Society (EPS)
- Volta Congress, an interwar cycle of cultural meetings
- Como Conference, also known as Volta Conference
- Villa Volta, an attraction in the amusement park Efteling in the Netherlands
- VOLTA (Cirque du Soleil), a touring big top show by Cirque du Soleil

== See also ==
- The Mars Volta, an American musical group
- Volt, the derived unit for electric potential, named in honour of Alessandro Volta
- Voltaic (disambiguation)
- Voltaic pile, the first electrical battery
- Volta do mar, a navigational technique perfected by the Portuguese during the late fifteenth century
- Conan: Hall of Volta, a 1984 action/platform computer game
