= Leopoldo Camillo Volta =

Italian historian (1751–1823)

Leopoldo Camillo Volta (1751-1823) was an Italian historian, mainly of the history of his native Mantua.

He studied initially under the Jesuits in Mantua, then graduated as a lawyer. After a spell in Vienna, in 1778 he was named by Empress Maria Teresa as prefect of the Government Library of Mantua, established in 1780, which became the Biblioteca Teresiana. He also was director of a local history of antiquities. Dismissed during the French occupation, he regained his post under the Austrian restoration. He wrote a number of manuscripts on the history of Mantua, including Compendio cronologico-critico della Storia di Mantova (1807). He also was editor of a journal titled Delle letteratura italiana e letteratura straniera starting in 1793.

Among his other publications were:

- Elogio all'abate Pellegrino Salandri
- Panegyric in verse of Maria Teresa
- Memoria in torno alla vita e agli scritti di Bonifacio Vitalini, leggista Mantovano del secolo XV
- Noticia di alcuni letterati della nobile Mantovana famiglia Arrivabene
- Osservazioni storico-critiche sopra una chiave di bronze dissotterrata in Mantova nel 1730
- Saggio storico sulla topografia Mantovana nel secolo XV
