= Maurizio Arrivabene =

CEO of Juventus Football Club

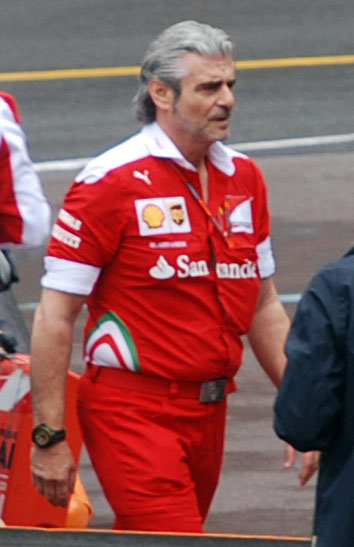
- Arrivabene at the 2016 Monaco Grand Prix
- Born: 7 March 1957 (age 69); Brescia, Italy
- Occupations: Team principal of Scuderia Ferrari (2014–2019); CEO of Juventus (2021–2022)
- Spouses: Stefania Bocchi, Ulrika Eriksson (m. 1990–1995)
- Children: 1

Maurizio Arrivabene (born 7 March 1957) is an Italian manager and sports director.

Arrivabene was team principal of Formula One team Scuderia Ferrari. He was appointed team principal in November 2014, replacing Marco Mattiacci, and was replaced by Mattia Binotto in January 2019.

== Early life ==
Maurizio Arrivabene was born on 7 March 1957 in Brescia, Italy.

== Career ==
Arrivabene comes from a marketing and sales background. In 1997, he joined Philip Morris International, rising to become Vice President of Marlboro Global Communication and Promotions in 2007, and Vice President of Consumer Channel Strategy and Event Marketing in 2011. Through his work with Philip Morris, he became involved with the company's sponsorship (through the Marlboro brand) of the Ferrari Formula One team, and sat on the Formula One Commission as a representative of the sport's sponsors from 2010.

On 23 November 2014, Ferrari announced that Arrivabene had been appointed as its team principal, replacing Marco Mattiacci, who had himself only been in the position since April that year. The decision to install Arrivabene was made by the new Ferrari chairman, Sergio Marchionne, who gave Arrivabene's "thorough understanding not just of Ferrari but also of the governance mechanisms and requirements of the sport" as part of the reason for his appointment. This appointment was part of a team rejuvenation process by Marchionne who deposed the ex long-time Ferrari Chairman, Luca di Montezemolo. Arrivabene was replaced as Ferrari team principal by former technical boss Mattia Binotto on 7 January 2019 after the 2018 season.

Arrivabene has been an independent board member of Italian football club Juventus FC since 2012. Former CEO of Juventus, on 28 November 2022, the entire Juventus board of directors, including Arrivabene, resigned from their respective roles amid scandal. On 20 January 2023, Arrivabene was suspended for two years from holding office in Italian football as punishment for capital gain violations as part of the Plusvalenza scandal.

== Personal life ==
Arrivabene and Ulrika Eriksson met in Madonna di Campiglio in 1986 and were married from 1990 until 1995. Their daughter was born in 1990. As of May 2021, Arrivabene was married to Stefania Bocchi.
