= Voltan =

Deity in Mayan religious tradition

In Maya mythology, Voltan was an earth and drum god (originally a human hero who was deified), married to Ixchel.

The Maya believed in many different gods. These gods played a heavy role in the life of the Maya. They all had different roles. Some controlled the weather, the harvest, they dictated one's mate, they gathered at every birth, they were in attendance at one's death, and many more. Many of the things that the Maya did was a sign of respect for their gods; dress, architecture, etc.
