= Ulrika Eriksson =

Swedish television presenter and model

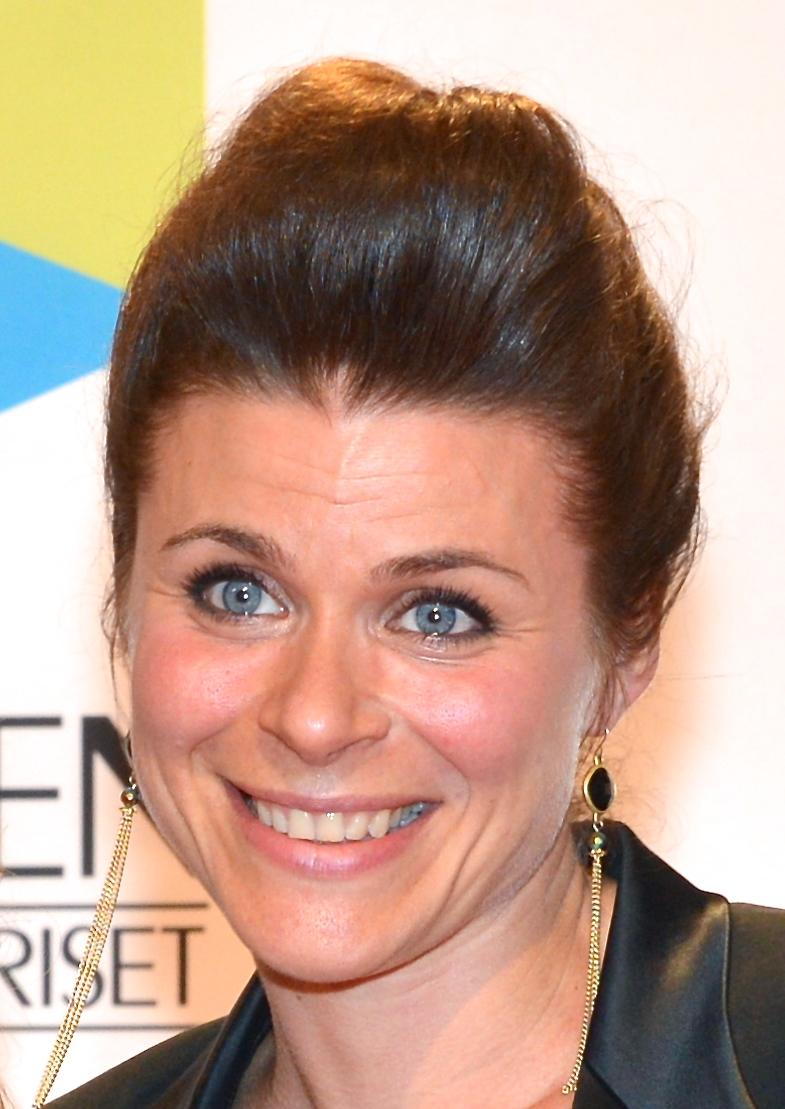
- Ulrika Eriksson (2013)
- Born: 12 July 1973 (age 53); Stockholm, Sweden
- Occupation: Television presenter

Ulrika Eriksson (born 12 July 1973, Stockholm) is a Swedish television presenter and model. She was an established swimsuit model when she became a Playboy Playmate (United States edition) in November 1996. Eriksson has worked for MTV Europe, TV3 and TV4 as a presenter for several shows like Silikon, Spårlöst, Äntligen trädgård, Rampfeber and the morning news show Nyhetsmorgon. She also presented the music award show Grammisgalan in 2006. She is in a relationship with artist of The Cardigans and they have a son and a daughter.
