= Marco Mattiacci =

Italian businessman (born 1970)

- Born: Marco Mattiacci; 8 December 1970 (age 55); Rome, Italy
- Occupations: Marketing, brand, and product specialist
- Known for: Ferrari, Maserati, Scuderia Ferrari, Aston Martin
- Title: Global chief brand and commercial officer at Aston Martin
- Spouse: Farah Dib

Marco Mattiacci (born 8 December 1970) is an Italian businessman.

He was formerly the global chief brand officer and chief commercial officer at Faraday Future, president and CEO of Ferrari North America, president and CEO of Ferrari Asia Pacific, and a former managing director and team principal of Scuderia Ferrari Formula 1 racing team.

== Career ==
Born in Rome, Mattiacci studied economics at the University La Sapienza. He later attended Columbia University Business School before being accepted into the INSEAD international executive program in Singapore.

From 1989 to 1999, Mattiacci worked in the Jaguar Cars marketing department in the United Kingdom. In 1999, he was signed by Ferrari as an area sales manager in the Americas and the Middle East. From 2001 to 2002, Mattiacci was promoted to manage the launch of the Maserati brand in the North American market.

In 2006, he was named president and CEO of Ferrari Asia Pacific. In 2009, Mattiacci was selected as one of 100 leaders of Outstanding Foreign Enterprises in China by Management World Press and the Development Research Center of the State Council of the State of China.

He was named president and CEO of Ferrari North America in 2010. In 2012, he received the Automotive Executive of the Year Award, which cited a 20% increase in Ferrari sales across North, Central, and South America, as well as the company's emphasis on customer satisfaction, ownership experience, and brand integrity. During his tenure, Ferrari's sales in these markets nearly doubled.

During 2014, Mattiacci took over the position of managing director and team principal of the Scuderia Ferrari Formula 1 racing team from Stefano Domenicali.

In 2016, Mattiacci joined Faraday Future as global chief brand officer and chief commercial officer.

In 2022, he was appointed by Aston Martin to be its global chief brand and commercial officer.

In November 2024 Mattiacci left Aston Martin by mutual consent.
