= 2000 German Grand Prix =

Formula One motor race held in 2000

Race 11 of 17 in the 2000 Formula One World Championship
| ← Previous race | Next race → |
- Hockenheimring (last modified in 1994)

Race details
- Date: 30 July 2000
- Official name: Grosser Mobil 1 Preis von Deutschland 2000
- Location: Hockenheimring, Hockenheim, Baden-Württemberg, Germany
- Course: Permanent racing facility
- Course length: 6.825 km (4.240 miles)
- Distance: 45 laps, 307.125 km (190.783 miles)
- Weather: Dry/Wet

Pole position
| Driver | (United Kingdom) David Coulthard | McLaren-Mercedes |
- Time: 1:45.697

Fastest lap
| Driver | (Brazil) Rubens Barrichello | Ferrari |
- Time: 1:44.300 on lap 20

Podium
| First | (Brazil) Rubens Barrichello | Ferrari |
| Second | (Finland) Mika Häkkinen | McLaren-Mercedes |
| Third | (United Kingdom) David Coulthard | McLaren-Mercedes |

The 2000 German Grand Prix (formally the Grosser Mobil 1 Preis von Deutschland 2000) was a Formula One motor race contested on 30 July 2000, at the Hockenheimring in Baden-Württemberg, Germany, in front of 102,000 people. It was the 62nd German Grand Prix and the 11th round of the 2000 Formula One World Championship. Ferrari's Rubens Barrichello won the 45-lap race after starting 18th. McLaren's Mika Häkkinen finished second, with teammate David Coulthard third.

Before the race, Michael Schumacher led the World Drivers' Championship and Ferrari led the World Constructors' Championship. Coulthard began alongside Michael Schumacher on pole position after qualifying fastest. Coulthard's teammate Häkkinen started fourth. At the first corner, Michael Schumacher moved to the left, colliding with Giancarlo Fisichella, and both drivers retired. Häkkinen took the race lead, which he retained until lap 25 when an intruder breached circuit limits, forcing drivers to pit under safety car conditions. Meanwhile, until the first safety car period, Barrichello had gained thirteen positions to fifth. After Coulthard's stop on lap 27, Häkkinen reclaimed the lead. Barrichello stayed out on dry slick tyres, moving into the lead and retaining it to achieve his maiden Formula One victory.

Barrichello's victory was widely celebrated among the Formula One paddock as it came after a career setback. The race result tied Häkkinen and Coulthard for second, but it decreased Schumacher's championship points lead in the World Drivers' Championship to two. Barrichello trailed the McLaren drivers by eight championship points. With six races remaining in the season, McLaren was four championship points behind Ferrari and 76 championship points ahead of Williams in the World Constructors' Championship. The track intruder, named as 47-year-old Frenchman Robert Sehli, eventually apologised and was fined by track administration.

== Background ==
On 30 July 2000, the eleventh of seventeen rounds of the 2000 Formula One World Championship was held at the 6.825 km (4.241 mi) clockwise Hockenheimring near the town of Hockenheim in Baden-Württemberg, Germany. There were eleven teams (each representing a different constructor), each with two drivers and were the same as those on the season entry list. Sole tyre supplier Bridgestone provided soft and medium dry tyre compounds, as well as intermediate and full wet-weather compounds to the race.

Before the race, Ferrari's Michael Schumacher led the World Drivers' Championship with 56 championship points, followed by McLaren's David Coulthard and teammate Mika Häkkinen with 50 and 48 championship points, respectively. Ferrari's Rubens Barrichello was fourth with 36 championship points, while Benetton's Giancarlo Fisichella was fifth with 18 championship points. Ferrari led the World Constructors' Championship with 92 championship points, McLaren and Williams were second and third with 88 and 19 championship points, respectively, Benetton was fourth with 18 championship points, and British American Racing (BAR) was fifth with 12 championship points.

Following the Austrian Grand Prix on 16 July, the teams tested at three circuits from 18 to 21 July to prepare for the event. McLaren, Benetton, Jordan, Jaguar, Sauber and BAR went to Silverstone over three days, working on low-drag racing setups. Olivier Panis, McLaren's test driver, led testing's first day. Jaguar test driver Luciano Burti damaged his car's suspension, front and rear wings, and sidepod in an accident at Stowe corner. Testing was briefly stopped and Jaguar shipped a spare car for the next day's testing. Panis remained fastest on the second day. Jarno Trulli damaged his suspension and rear wing, resulting in repairs which limited his team's testing time. Burti's right rear wheel detached. Fisichella led the third and final day's running. Ferrari test driver Luca Badoer spent four days at the Fiorano Circuit focused on engine and aerodynamic development, while Michael Schumacher did practice starts and component testing on the fourth day. Arrows did not test during this period and instead focused on technical problems with the aim of improving reliability at its Leafield headquarters for the race in Germany.

Michael Schumacher went to Germany as the championship leader with his team Ferrari under scrutiny because he had scored ten championship points over the past four races as a result of three retirements and a win in Canada while Coulthard had scored 20 championship points, reducing Schumacher's lead to six championship points. Jaguar's Eddie Irvine Jaguar was passed fit in the days before to the race. He arrived at the previous race ill with suspected appendicitis and withdrew at the conclusion of the Friday practice sessions. Burti replaced him. Irvine was later admitted to a London hospital and diagnosed with a swollen intestine. Irvine said he felt ready to race again: "I'm looking forward to Hockenheim. I have been keeping tabs on the team's Silverstone test this week and we're all encouraged by what has been achieved."

Teams setup their cars for the long straights of the Hockenheimring circuit, necessitating reducing aerodynamic downforce and increasing aerodynamic efficiency. The Jaguar team included multiple characteristics in its cars. It replaced the huge panels mounted behind the front wheels with smaller screens mounted between the suspension. They also returned to the bodywork seen at the Monaco Grand Prix and installed a new uprated Cosworth engine. Jordan's new car, the EJ10B, was also introduced that weekend; the team had previously raced with their primary 2000 car, the EJ10. Originally scheduled to debut at the previous race in Austria, the vehicle was required to complete Fédération Internationale de l'Automobile (FIA) safety tests on its bodywork and Jordan wished to create extra spare components for the EJ10B, postponing the car's race début.

== Practice ==
Two one-hour sessions on Friday and two 45-minute sessions on Saturday preceded Sunday's race. The Friday practices were held in dry, cloudy weather, becoming damp during the day, making the track slippery. Michael Schumacher set the first session's fastest time of 1:43.532, almost six-tenths of a second faster than Häkkinen. Barrichello was third, slightly behind Häkkinen, with Coulthard fourth; both Barrichello and Coulthard led during the session. Jordan's Heinz-Harald Frentzen, BAR driver Ricardo Zonta, Fisichella, Sauber's Mika Salo, Williams' Ralf Schumacher and Herbert followed in the top ten. Few incidents occurred during practice as some drivers went off the circuit. Trulli's engine failed after 20 minutes at the Ostkurve turn and marshals relocated his car with yellow flags. Jenson Button spun and slammed against the inside barriers at the pit lane entry after practice ended and rain fell, removing his car's front wing.

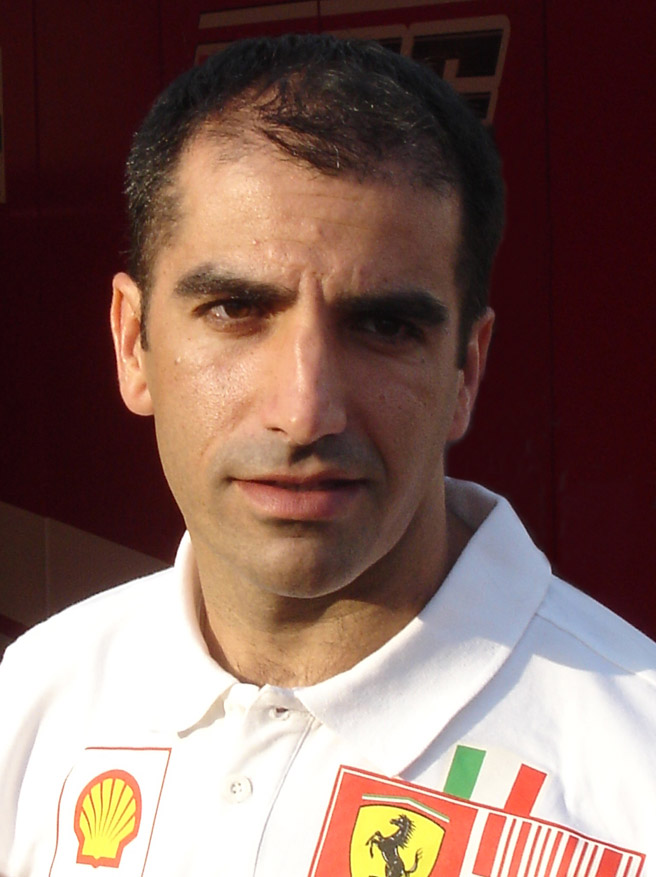
Marc Gené (pictured in 2007) was one of two Minardi drivers to crash in the second free practice session.

Heavy rain made the track wet and dusty, slowing lap times in the second practice session. The slick surface and wet-weather tyres become familiar to drivers. After nearly three-quarters of the session had passed and the track dried, competitive lap times began to be set. Michael Schumacher's lap time did not improve, but remained the fastest. Frentzen lapped quicker and was second-fastest. Although both McLaren drivers were testing race set-up and brake performance, Häkkinen finished third and Coulthard fifth. Barrichello separated them. Trulli, Zonta, Villeneuve, Fisichella, and Salo completed the top ten. Several drivers entered the gravel traps during the session. The two Minardi drivers crashed. Gastón Mazzacane hit the barrier in the stadium section and Marc Gené beached his car in the last turn's gravel trap. Ralf Schumacher missed half of the session as his team switched the engine in his car.

The Saturday morning sessions were held in damp weather with occasional rain. Most of practice saw the circuit dry with sunlight appearing through the clouds. Häkkinen set the third session's fastest lap, a 1:44.144, one-tenth of a second quicker than Arrows' Pedro de la Rosa. Coulthard, Frentzen, Salo. Trulli, Barrichello, Michael Schumacher, Villeneuve and Fisichella completed the top ten. Ralf Schumacher, who completed just one lap in the session's second half, lost control of his car after crossing the start/finish line on a damp area and hit the turn one tyre barrier as the racing line began drying. Jean Alesi simultaneously beached his Prost car in the gravel due to a rear suspension failure on the damp circuit.

The track became completely dry during the last practice session and lap times fell as drivers found more grip on it. Nearly every driver exited the pit lane in the first minutes, giving teams a final chance to significantly adjust their cars before qualifying. Häkkinen set the day's quickest time, a 1:41.658, with 15 minutes remaining; his teammate Coulthard finished third. Ferrari's Michael Schumacher and Rubens Barrichello were second and fourth, respectively. Frentzen fell to fifth, with Fisichella, sixth, pleased with the feel of his car. Button, Salo, Villeneuve, and Trulli were seventh to tenth. Fisichella's car billowed smoke because of an engine failure in the final seconds at the North Kurve turn. Michael Schumacher went 50 m (160 ft) backwards into the Opel Kurve corner wall in the stadium section after the session. Schumacher drove the spare Ferrari in qualifying.

== Qualifying ==
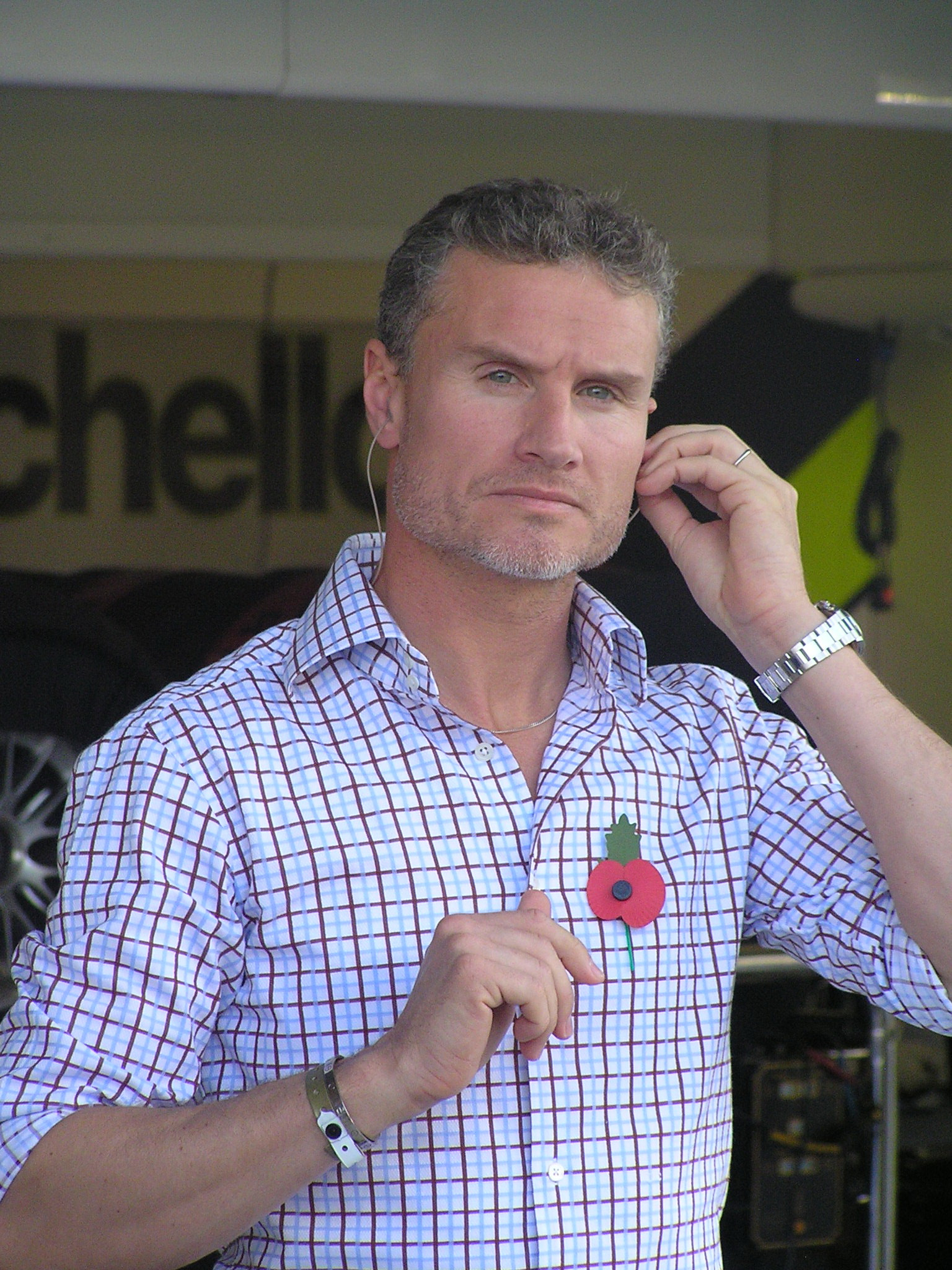
David Coulthard (pictured in 2009) took pole position in his McLaren.

During Saturday's one-hour qualifying session, each driver was limited to twelve laps, with the starting order determined by the fastest laps. The 107% rule was in force during this session, requiring each driver to lap within 107% of the fastest time to qualify for the race. The session was held in damp weather with intermittent rain, which resulted in a mixed-up starting order in places. Drivers used grooved and wet-weather compound tyres with drivers initially hesitant to go onto the track. With a lap time of 1:45.697 set on his first try, Coulthard earned his second pole position of the season after the European Grand Prix and 10th overall. Michael Schumacher joined him on the front row, 1.3 seconds slower than Coulthard but three-tenths of a second faster than his previous best lap to move from fourth to second. Fisichella qualified third in a spare Benetton car with incorrect gear ratios. He spun on his first run but retained second until Michael Schumacher's lap as the rain stopped. Fisichella was fined $5,000 for failing to place his car at the pit-lane weighbridge so that the FIA could check if it was within the legal minimum weight limit. Häkkinen, who qualified fourth, three hundredths of a second slower than Fisichella, admitted the weather made him cautious about going off the track. In his then-career-best qualifying performance, De la Rosa took fifth in the spare Arrows car while his race car was being prepared. Trulli (the faster Jordan driver) and Wurz were satisfied to qualify sixth and seventh. Herbert was the quicker Jaguar driver in eighth. Villeneuve secured ninth in BAR's spare car after losing control of his car and stalling at the Jim Clark chicane, disrupting Frentzen's running. Irvine, tenth, was slowed by Gené midway attempting to lap quicker.

Jos Verstappen had engine starting problems, resulting in Arrows removing the car's floor to install a starter. A lack of qualifying laps for Verstappen left him 11th. Zonta, 12th, used a new engine and was impeded by Alesi at the final chicane in the stadium area. He was ahead of Alesi's teammate Nick Heidfeld in 13th whose lap was set simultaneously as Fisichella's. Ralf Schumacher, 14th, outpaced teammate Jenson Button, 16th; the change in weather caught Williams out. They were separated by Salo in 15th, who encountered two cars on his first fast lap and was slowed by the weather. Frentzen, 17th, spent most of qualifying 107 per cent outside of the quickest lap; the stewards disallowed his first quick lap when he cut the first chicane trying to find room and pass two slower vehicles to lap faster and avoid being hampered by aerodynamic turbulence. Barrichello was unable to captalise on the best of the conditions and took 18th in his teammate's repaired race car from practice after his Ferrari developed oil-leak issues on his opening run; his mechanics adjusted the settings of his pedals to suit Barrichello's right-footed braking style before he could drive. Barrichello was also asked to park at the weighbridge for car weight checks. Sauber's Pedro Diniz, 19th, lost time amongst slower cars, with Alesi 20th and Mazzacane 21st. Mazzacane's teammate Gené in 22nd incorrectly used wet-weather tyres and abandoned his car on the track with a gearbox fault; he drove the spare Minardi car.

=== Qualifying classification ===
| Pos | No | Driver | Constructor | Lap | Gap |
|---|---|---|---|---|---|
| 1 | 2 | (United Kingdom) David Coulthard | McLaren-Mercedes | 1:45.697 | — |
| 2 | 3 | (Germany) Michael Schumacher | Ferrari | 1:47.063 | +1.366 |
| 3 | 11 | (Italy) Giancarlo Fisichella | Benetton-Playlife | 1:47.130 | +1.433 |
| 4 | 1 | (Finland) Mika Häkkinen | McLaren-Mercedes | 1:47.162 | +1.465 |
| 5 | 18 | (Spain) Pedro de la Rosa | Arrows-Supertec | 1:47.786 | +2.089 |
| 6 | 6 | (Italy) Jarno Trulli | Jordan-Mugen-Honda | 1:47.833 | +2.136 |
| 7 | 12 | (Austria) Alexander Wurz | Benetton-Playlife | 1:48.037 | +2.340 |
| 8 | 8 | (United Kingdom) Johnny Herbert | Jaguar-Cosworth | 1:48.078 | +2.381 |
| 9 | 22 | (Canada) Jacques Villeneuve | BAR-Honda | 1:48.121 | +2.424 |
| 10 | 7 | (United Kingdom) Eddie Irvine | Jaguar-Cosworth | 1:48.305 | +2.608 |
| 11 | 19 | (Netherlands) Jos Verstappen | Arrows-Supertec | 1:48.321 | +2.624 |
| 12 | 23 | (Brazil) Ricardo Zonta | BAR-Honda | 1:48.665 | +2.968 |
| 13 | 15 | (Germany) Nick Heidfeld | Prost-Peugeot | 1:48.690 | +2.993 |
| 14 | 9 | (Germany) Ralf Schumacher | Williams-BMW | 1:48.841 | +3.144 |
| 15 | 17 | (Finland) Mika Salo | Sauber-Petronas | 1:49.204 | +3.507 |
| 16 | 10 | (United Kingdom) Jenson Button | Williams-BMW | 1:49.215 | +3.518 |
| 17 | 5 | (Germany) Heinz-Harald Frentzen | Jordan-Mugen-Honda | 1:49.280 | +3.583 |
| 18 | 4 | (Brazil) Rubens Barrichello | Ferrari | 1:49.544 | +3.847 |
| 19 | 16 | (Brazil) Pedro Diniz | Sauber-Petronas | 1:49.936 | +4.239 |
| 20 | 14 | (France) Jean Alesi | Prost-Peugeot | 1:50.289 | +4.592 |
| 21 | 21 | (Argentina) Gastón Mazzacane | Minardi-Fondmetal | 1:51.611 | +5.914 |
| 22 | 20 | (Spain) Marc Gené | Minardi-Fondmetal | 1:53.094 | +7.397 |
107% time: 1:53.096

== Warm-up ==
The drivers took to the track at 09:30 Central European Summer Time (GMT+2) for a 30-minute warm-up session. Ten minutes in, Coulthard lapped fastest at 1:44.065; Häkkinen was second in the other McLaren, followed by De la Rosa and Michael Schumacher. Villeneuve and Verstappen collided at the Jim Clark chicane during their installation lap just as warm-up started. Yellow flags were waved because both Villeneuve and Verstappen's cars were stationary and obstructing much of the track. Verstappen sustained multiple arm abrasions. Coulthard spun backwards into the tyre wall at the stadium section's final double right-hand turn after drifting wide onto dust. He damaged his car's front wing, and returned to the pit lane to drive the spare McLaren. When Heidfeld's engine cover detached into the Ostkurve corner, littering the circuit with carbon fibre debris, waved yellow flags were once again required. De la Rosa suffered a right-rear tyre puncture after driving over some carbon fibre debris and stopped on the side of the circuit. He was unhurt.

== Race ==
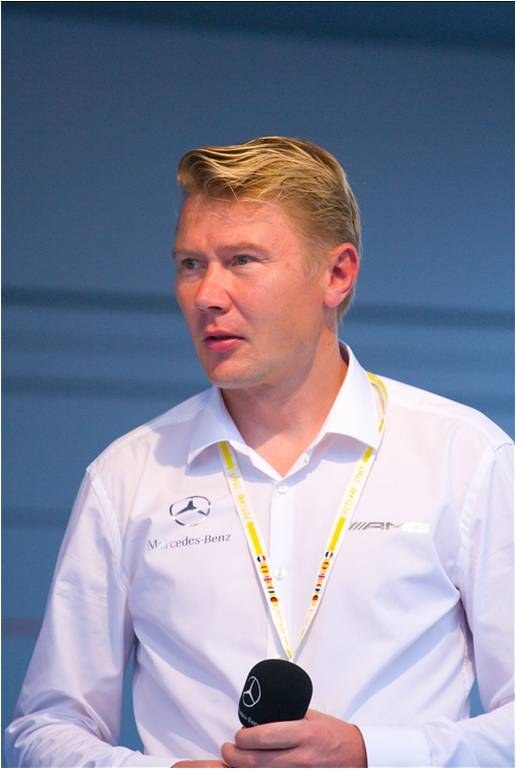
Mika Häkkinen (pictured in 2009) took the lead at the start of the race, but fell to second after his second pit stop.

The 45-lap race ran before 102,000 spectators over 307.125 km (190.839 mi) from 14:00 local time. The race began in dry weather, but became damp and wet as it progressed. The air temperature was 21 °C (70 °F) and the track temperature ranged from 21 to 25 °C (70 to 77 °F). Rain began falling in the stadium section eleven minutes before the parade lap, but it stopped eight minutes later. Ferrari adjusted the angle of Michael Schumacher's front wing to better cope with wet weather that the team expected. Several drivers adjusted their rear wings, slowing them slightly but improving their steering in tight corners. Button's engine suddenly failed to start during the parade lap, forcing him to start from the rear of the field. When the lights went out to start the race, Coulthard and Michael Schumacher made slow starts. Coulthard steered hard right to the inside so as to obstruct Michael Schumacher's path, allowing teammate Häkkinen to veer left and take the lead. Noticing Häkkinen to his left, Michael Schumacher reacted by moving to the racing line on the outside of the track in front of Fisichella. His left-rear wheel and Fisichella's front wing collided after catching Fisichella off guard and his braking late. Fisichella's front wing was removed from his car. Both drivers ran off the track, struck the turn one tyre barrier and retired from the race. The safety car was not deployed since both cars were far off the track.

Barrichello, on a two-stop strategy making his car light, moved from 18th to 10th to end lap one. At the first lap's completion, Häkkinen led from Coulthard, Trulli, De la Rosa, Irvine, Herbert, and Verstappen. Häkkinen began to maintain his lead from teammate Coulthard. Herbert moved into fifth place after Irvine fell to seventh after Verstappen overtook him for sixth on lap two. Barrichello advanced further up the field, passing both BAR drivers for eighth. The McLaren drivers maintained their gap over Trulli, who set the race's fastest lap of 1:46.321. Irvine lost another place to Barrichello on lap three following a short battle, as Frentzen took 14th from Diniz. On lap four, Frentzen passed Heidfeld for 13th. On the same lap Verstappen locked up his tyres to avoid hitting Herbert. This allowed Barrichello to pass Verstappen for sixth into the Jim Clark chicane on lap five, as the Arrows vehicle suffered with braking into the chicanes. On lap six, Herbert lost fifth to Barrichello, while Frentzen gained more places, passing Ralf Schumacher and Wurz for 11th.

Barrichello began setting successive fastest laps, closing up to De la Rosa. Frentzen overtook Zonta for tenth on lap seven. On the next lap, Verstappen's engine cover detached from the chassis as Frentzen advanced four spots over the next four laps. Further down, Ralf Schumacher overtook Zonta for 11th and Diniz passed teammate Salo for 14th. By lap 11, Barrichello had caught De la Rosa and passed him for fourth a lap later. Frentzen began pressuring De la Rosa. Herbert retired at the side of the track with clutch failure on lap 13. Two laps later, braking for the Jim Clark chicane, Barrichello passed Trulli for third. Barrichello was the first driver to make a pit stop, entering the pit lane for the first of two planned stops at the end of lap 17 (7.2 seconds). He rejoined the circuit in sixth place. Frentzen stopped one lap later and fell to sixth, behind Barrichello. By lap 20, Häkkinen had a 1.4-second advantage over Coulthard, who was nearly 22 seconds ahead of Trulli. De la Rosa was 2.1 seconds behind Trulli and was being caught by Barrichello, who set a new fastest lap of 1:44.300. At this stage, it appeared that McLaren would finish in first and second. Villeneuve passed Irvine for eighth on lap 22.

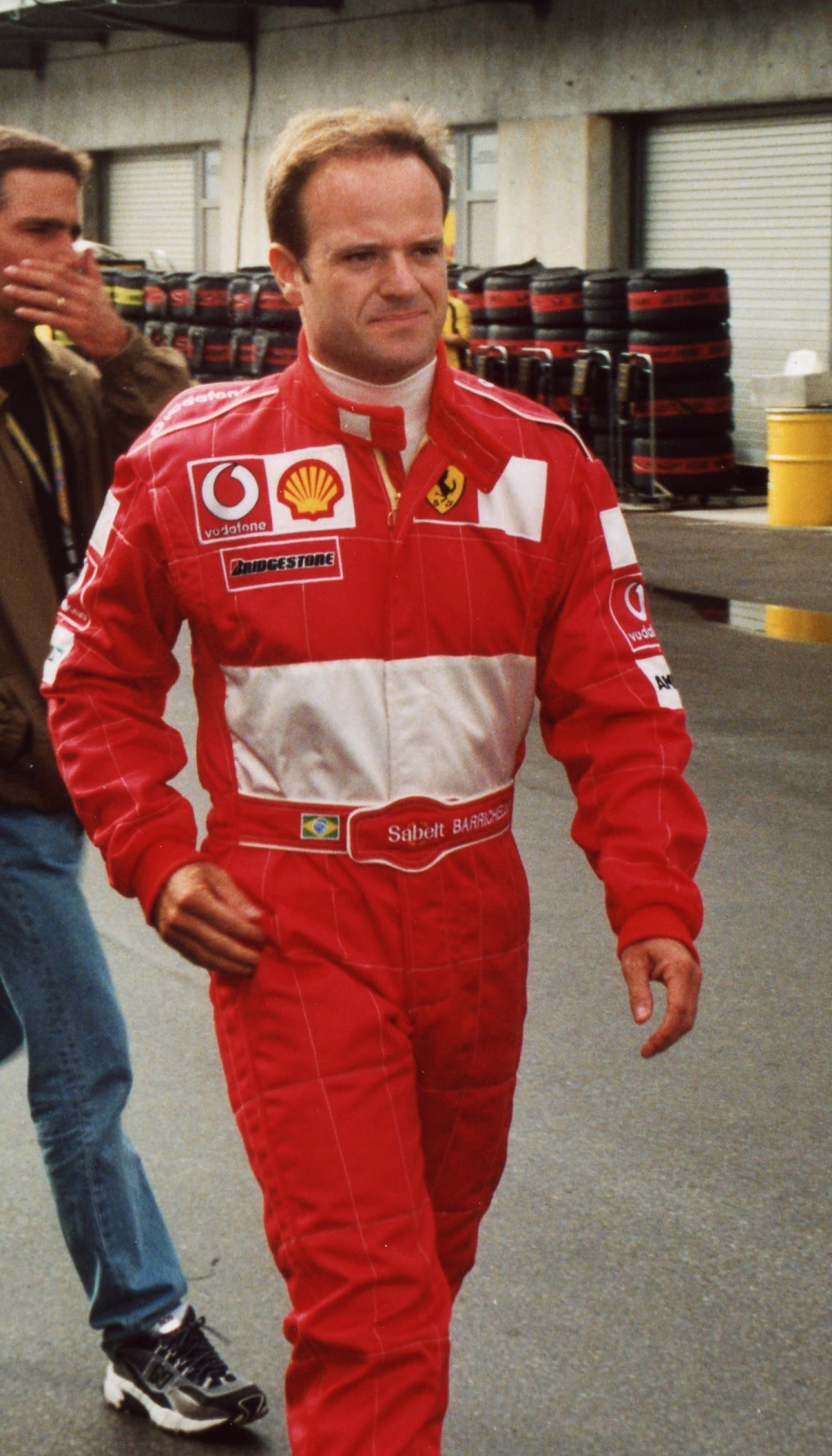
Rubens Barrichello (pictured in 2002) took the first win of his Formula One career.

On lap 25, a man wearing a white raincoat with French writing critical of Mercedes-Benz appeared from beside the barriers and stepped onto the outside edge towards the Ostkurve. To avoid being apprehended by marshals, he ran in front of a group of cars approaching him at high speed to the inside of the track. The incident prompted race officials to deploy the safety car and the field closed up, eliminating McLaren's lead. As the pit stop window approached, teams rushed their drivers into the pit lane to take advantage of the situation, with Trulli and De la Rosa being the first to stop. Both Häkkinen and Coulthard had passed the pit lane following the safety car's deployment as other teams could make pit stops without losing position to others. At the end of lap 26, McLaren called Häkkinen to the pit lane. Coulthard stayed out on worn tyres due to radio communication uncertainty about whether he should have entered the pit lane. Coulthard thus drove a slow lap behind the safety car, and made his pit stop on the following lap and fell to sixth. On the same lap, the man was caught and escorted off the circuit. The safety car period benefited those who had stopped before it was deployed.

Racing resumed on lap 29 when the safety car entered the pit lane. Trulli was immediately put under pressure by Barrichello and resisted his attempts to pass him. On lap 30, Ralf Schumacher spun at the Jim Clark chicane, forcing Verstappen wide. Later, on the approach to the Ayrton Senna chicane, Diniz made a mistake under braking as he attempted to pass Alesi and went across him at high speed. Alesi crashed into the barrier at high speed, removing his car's left-hand side wheels. He was subjected to multiple 360 degrees. Diniz's car was not damaged. Alesi suffered from abdominal pains, dizziness and vomiting. Officials again deployed the safety car as carbon fibre was scattered across the grass and needed removing by marshals. The safety car was withdrawn at the end of the 31st lap, and the race resumed with Häkkinen leading.

Salo avoided colliding with the slow to react Wurz on the start/finish straight, sending Wurz spinning onto the grass. Although Wurz's car stopped at the side of the track with a gearbox jam, marshals were able to move it away and racing continued without the need for a third safety car period due to the Hockenheimring's length. Light rain began to fall in the stadium on lap 32 and on other parts of the circuit a lap later, making the stadium section, the start/finish straight and turn one soggy. On the following lap, Button was the first driver to pit, and his Williams pit crew swapped his dry tyres for wets. With a failed engine and oil on the track on lap 34, Gené became the race's seventh retirement. The rain had intensified on that lap and became a downpour in the stadium section on lap 35. Villeneuve spun after making minor contact with teammate Zonta's rear exiting the first turn on that lap while the two were battling over seventh position but continued racing.

A total of 11 of the 15 drivers who were still running, apart from Barrichello, Coulthard, Frentzen and Zonta, made pit stops for wet-weather tyres. After technical director Ross Brawn informed Barrichello of Häkkinen's final pit stop, the two agreed he could stay on the track. They believed that because the rain had not reached the track's outer edge, grooved tyres could still allow for fast laps. Brawn obtained information indicating that Barrichello might lap faster than wet-weather shod cars. The circuit was drier in some parts than others; Häkkinen lapped the wet stadium section three seconds faster than the circumspect Barrichello. Häkkinen lost most of his advantage through the dry chicanes, which gave his wet-weather tyres little grip. Trulli was imposed a ten-second stop and go penalty on lap 37 when marshals reported him for passing Barrichello under safety car conditions as Barrichello was exiting the pit lane while Trulli was leaving the first turn. He took the penalty immediately and fell to 11th. Zonta was also penalised, but he crashed into the tyre wall at the Sachs hairpin because he was distracted by a radio communication informing him of the penalty. Frentzen pressured Coulthard who made a driving error and cut the Jim Clark chicane on lap 38. Coulthard became the final driver to make a pit stop on the same lap but his team were not ready for him, dropping to fifth. Button then passed De la Rosa for sixth.

At the completion of lap 39, with the pit stops completed, the top six were Barrichello, Häkkinen, Frentzen, Salo, Coulthard, and Button. Frentzen retired with gearbox failure at the start/finish straight on lap 40 as Coulthard overtook Salo for third. Heidfeld became the race's final retirement owing to alternator failure on lap 40. Rain returned two laps later. Button caught Salo on lap 43 and made an aggressive pass for fourth. By lap 44, it began raining more heavily, but Barrichello held on to win his maiden Formula One race and the first for a Brazilian driver since Ayrton Senna in the 1993 Australian Grand Prix on his 123rd entry, at an average speed of 215.340 km/h (133.806 mph). It was Barrichello's sole victory of the 2000 season. Häkkinen finished 7.4 seconds behind Barrichello, with his teammate Coulthard third. Button finished fourth, his season-best finish in his first-full season, ahead of Salo in fifth and De la Rosa the final points-scorer in sixth. Ralf Schumacher, Villeneuve, Trulli, Irvine and Mazzacane filled the next five positions, with Heidfeld the final classified driver despite his alternator failure. Verstappen, the other race retirement, spun into the gravel trap in the stadium section after 39 laps.

== Post-race ==
The top three drivers appeared on the podium to collect their trophies and in the subsequent press conference. Barrichello's first win was widely celebrated among spectators and team personnel, because it came after an earlier setback, including a major accident during practice for the 1994 San Marino Grand Prix that rendered him unconscious. Barrichello was visibly emotional over the radio during the slow-down lap and on the podium, and dedicated his victory to Senna, who had assisted him in his early career. He also disclosed that he chose to race on dry tyres because he believed he would have an advantage on the straights and chicanes, even though he flat-spotted a tyre in the race's closing stages, reducing his visibility. Häkkinen stated that he was "in control" of the event throughout the first phase, while he confessed that he was careful on wet tyres and could have won on dry tyres. Coulthard revealed that he used Michael Schumacher's aggressive tactics at the start after seeking clarity on the rules governing such manoeuvres. He also said that he was unable to communicate with his team in the forest portions, which prompted him to stay out for an extra lap after Häkkinen's pit stop.

Button was overjoyed with his then-career-best fourth and congratulated his team for timing the switch to wet-weather tyres. Salo regarded his race as "hard" because he chose a high downforce setup, which meant he was slower than his competitors on the straights. Furthermore, he revealed that near the end of the race, he ran out of engine oil as temperatures gradually rose. De la Rosa earned championship points for the second time this season after finishing fifth at the European Grand Prix. He thought the event was "strange," but was happy with his team's efforts. Michael Schumacher blamed Fisichella for the first-lap incident between the two drivers. "I am out of the race not because of David (Coulthard) but because of Fisichella." he said. Fisichella, conversely, maintained his racing line and believed that drivers should choose their preferred racing line before describing his race as a "waste." Michael Schumacher later said Fisichella apologised and neither driver was penalised for the accident. Schumacher's manager Willi Weber rejected reports the crash was part of a conspiracy. McLaren CEO Ron Dennis commented the team were flexible in their strategy but not to the extent to accommodate the track intruder, arguing he lost the team the victory and endangered his and drivers' lives. Trulli felt the rules governing the overtaking of cars that were leaving the pit lane under safety car conditions were unclear. Zonta said he was sorry for the contact with teammate Villeneueve, who did not accept the apology.

The majority of media attention, however, was focussed on the intruder who penetrated the circuit's barriers on lap 25. He was identified as Robert Sehli, a 47-year-old French father of three who spent 22 years working at a Mercedes-Benz production factory in Le Mans. The news reported that Sehli was protesting his dismissal on health grounds. Additional information revealed that he planned to protest 15 seconds before the start of the formation lap but marshals stopped this by dragging him off the circuit. Sehli had attempted to do something similar at the French Grand Prix before being stopped in the pit lane ten laps before the race ended by the FIA Photographers' Delegate. He was released on a DM 2,000 ($945) bail the Monday after the event. Retired Formula One driver Hans-Joachim Stuck said that Sehli had "succeeded in avenging himself on Mercedes." Brawn said that Sehli's actions were "very, very dangerous" and that similar intrusions "should never be allowed to happen again." However, Mercedes-Benz Motorsport vice president Norbert Haug called the police's treatment of Sehli a "scandal." Hockenheimring GmbH, the track's owners, reported that Sehli had been charged with trespassing. Mercedes-Benz would compensate him and he apologised for the track invasion. On 16 December, Sehli won a court battle against Mercedes-Benz, which was compelled to pay F91,000 for "dismissing him without any conclusive reasons." Hockenheimring GmbH, however, fined him £600 for breaching circuit limits.

The race result cut Michael Schumacher's lead in the World Drivers' Championship to two championship points. Häkkinen moved into second place, level on championship points with teammate Coulthard; both were eight championship points ahead of Barrichello, with Fisichella remained a distant fifth with 18 championship points. McLaren cut Ferrari's lead in the World Constructors' Championship to four championship points. Williams expanded their lead over Benetton to four championship points with 22 championship points, while BAR maintained fifth with 12 championship points with six races remaining.

=== Race classification ===
Drivers who scored championship points are denoted in bold.

| Pos | No | Driver | Constructor | Laps | Time/Retired | Grid | Points |
|---|---|---|---|---|---|---|---|
| 1 | 4 | (Brazil) **Rubens Barrichello** | **Ferrari** | 45 | 1:25:34.418 | 18 | 10 |
| 2 | 1 | (Finland) **Mika Häkkinen** | **McLaren-Mercedes** | 45 | + 7.452 | 4 | 6 |
| 3 | 2 | (United Kingdom) **David Coulthard** | **McLaren-Mercedes** | 45 | + 21.168 | 1 | 4 |
| 4 | 10 | (United Kingdom) **Jenson Button** | **Williams-BMW** | 45 | + 22.685 | 16 | 3 |
| 5 | 17 | (Finland) **Mika Salo** | **Sauber-Petronas** | 45 | + 27.112 | 15 | 2 |
| 6 | 18 | (Spain) **Pedro de la Rosa** | **Arrows-Supertec** | 45 | + 29.080 | 5 | 1 |
| 7 | 9 | (Germany) Ralf Schumacher | Williams-BMW | 45 | + 30.898 | 14 | |
| 8 | 22 | (Canada) Jacques Villeneuve | BAR-Honda | 45 | + 47.537 | 9 | |
| 9 | 6 | (Italy) Jarno Trulli | Jordan-Mugen-Honda | 45 | + 50.901 | 6 | |
| 10 | 7 | (United Kingdom) Eddie Irvine | Jaguar-Cosworth | 45 | + 1:19.664 | 10 | |
| 11 | 21 | (Argentina) Gastón Mazzacane | Minardi-Fondmetal | 45 | + 1:29.504 | 21 | |
| 12 | 15 | (Germany) Nick Heidfeld | Prost-Peugeot | 40 | Alternator | 13 | |
| Ret | 5 | (Germany) Heinz-Harald Frentzen | Jordan-Mugen-Honda | 39 | Gearbox | 17 | |
| Ret | 19 | (Netherlands) Jos Verstappen | Arrows-Supertec | 39 | Spun Off | 11 | |
| Ret | 23 | (Brazil) Ricardo Zonta | BAR-Honda | 37 | Spun Off | 12 | |
| Ret | 20 | (Spain) Marc Gené | Minardi-Fondmetal | 33 | Engine | 22 | |
| Ret | 12 | (Austria) Alexander Wurz | Benetton-Playlife | 31 | Electrical/Spun Off | 7 | |
| Ret | 16 | (Brazil) Pedro Diniz | Sauber-Petronas | 29 | Collision | 19 | |
| Ret | 14 | (France) Jean Alesi | Prost-Peugeot | 29 | Collision | 20 | |
| Ret | 8 | (United Kingdom) Johnny Herbert | Jaguar-Cosworth | 12 | Gearbox | 8 | |
| Ret | 3 | (Germany) Michael Schumacher | Ferrari | 0 | Collision | 2 | |
| Ret | 11 | (Italy) Giancarlo Fisichella | Benetton-Playlife | 0 | Collision | 3 | |

== Championship standings after the race ==
Drivers' Championship standings

| +/– | Pos | Driver | Points |
|---|---|---|---|
| | 1 | (Germany) Michael Schumacher | 56 |
| | 2 | (United Kingdom) David Coulthard | 54 |
| | 3 | (Finland) Mika Häkkinen | 54 |
| | 4 | (Brazil) Rubens Barrichello | 46 |
| | 5 | (Italy) Giancarlo Fisichella | 18 |

Constructors' Championship standings

| +/– | Pos | Constructor | Points |
|---|---|---|---|
| | 1 | (Italy) Ferrari | 102 |
| | 2 | (United Kingdom) McLaren-Mercedes | 98 |
| | 3 | (United Kingdom) Williams-BMW | 22 |
| | 4 | (Italy) Benetton-Playlife | 18 |
| | 5 | (United Kingdom) BAR-Honda | 12 |
Sources:

- Note: Only the top five positions are included for both sets of standings.

| Previous race: 2000 Austrian Grand Prix | FIA Formula One World Championship; 2000 season | Next race: 2000 Hungarian Grand Prix |
| Previous race: 1999 German Grand Prix | German Grand Prix | Next race: 2001 German Grand Prix |
