= 2000 Austrian Grand Prix =

Formula One motor race held in 2000 in Austria

Coordinates: 47°13′11″N 14°45′53″E

Race 10 of 17 in the 2000 Formula One World Championship
← Previous race	Next race →

Race details
- Date: 16 July 2000
- Official name: XXIX Großer A1 Preis von Österreich
- Location: A1-Ring, Spielberg, Styria, Austria
- Course: Permanent racing facility
- Course length: 4.326 km (2.688 miles)
- Distance: 71 laps, 307.146 km (190.852 miles)
- Weather: Partially cloudy, dry
- Attendance: 85,112

Pole position
Driver	(Finland) Mika Häkkinen	McLaren-Mercedes
- Time: 1:10.410

Fastest lap
Driver	(United Kingdom) David Coulthard	McLaren-Mercedes
- Time: 1:11.783 on lap 66

Podium
First	(Finland) Mika Häkkinen	McLaren-Mercedes
Second	(United Kingdom) David Coulthard	McLaren-Mercedes
Third	(Brazil) Rubens Barrichello	Ferrari

The 2000 Austrian Grand Prix (formally the XXIV Großer A1 Preis von Österreich) was a Formula One motor race held on 16 July 2000, at the A1-Ring near Spielberg, Styria, Austria, attended by 85,112 spectators. The 24th Austrian Grand Prix was the tenth round of the 2000 Formula One World Championship. McLaren's Mika Häkkinen won the 71-lap race from pole position, with teammate David Coulthard second and Ferrari's Rubens Barrichello third.

Heading into the race, Michael Schumacher led the World Drivers' Championship, while his team Ferrari led McLaren in the World Constructors' Championship. He started in fourth, alongside teammate Barrichello. British American Racing's (BAR) Ricardo Zonta collided with Michael Schumacher at the first corner, as five other drivers were involved in incidents during the opening lap. The crash forced Michael Schumacher to retire from the race, and the safety car was deployed. Following the withdrawal of the safety car after one lap, Häkkinen and Coulthard pulled away from the rest of the field. When Häkkinen made his first pit stop on lap 38, he rejoined behind Coulthard but in front of Barrichello. On lap 43, Coulthard made a pit stop, giving Häkkinen the lead, which he held for the rest of the race to earn his second victory of the 2000 season and his 16th in Formula One.

As a result of the race, Coulthard's second-place finish reduced his World Drivers' Championship lead over Michael Schumacher to six championship points, while Häkkinen's victory brought him to within two championship points of his teammate Coulthard. Following the race, McLaren was deducted ten championship points for a post-race technical infringement, allowing Ferrari to maintain a four-point lead in the World Constructors' Championship with seven races remaining.

== Background ==
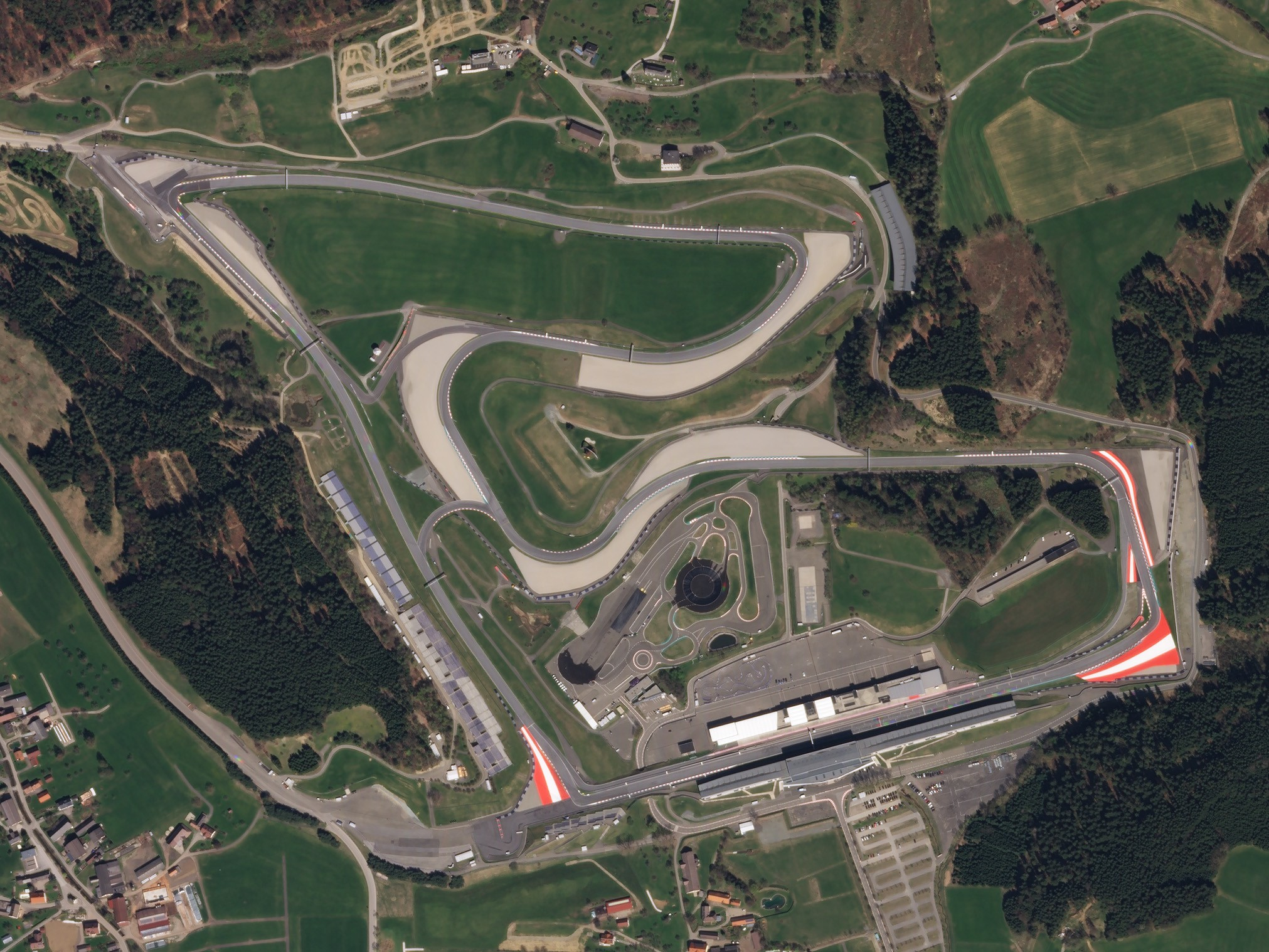
The A1-Ring (pictured in 2018 as the Red Bull Ring), where the race was held.

The 4.326 km (2.688 mi) A1-Ring hosted the tenth round of the 2000 Formula One World Championship, the 2000 Austrian Grand Prix, on 16 July 2000. It was the fourth time that the A1-Ring had hosted the Austrian Grand Prix since its alternation. The event featured eleven teams (each representing a different constructor), each with two drivers, with no changes from the season entry list. Tyre supplier Bridgestone brought the Soft and Medium dry compound tyres to the event. Before the race, minimal safety upgrades were made to the A1-Ring. New kerbs were erected across the track, with flagstones inside to prevent dust from gathering on the circuit. At each corner, an additional row of tyres was installed to increase absorption in the event of a collision.

Before the race, Ferrari's Michael Schumacher led the World Drivers' Championship with 56 championship points, followed by McLaren's David Coulthard on 44 championship points and his teammate Mika Häkkinen on 38 championship points. Ferrari's Rubens Barrichello was fourth with 32 championship points and Benetton's Giancarlo Fisichella was fifth with 18 championship points. Ferrari led the World Constructors' Championship with 88 championship points, six championship points clear of second-placed McLaren. Benetton were third with 18 championship points, Williams fourth with 17 championship points, and Jordan fifth with 11 championship points.

Following the French Grand Prix on 2 July, six teams tested for three days at the Silverstone Circuit in Britain from 4 to 6 July in preparation for the Austrian Grand Prix at the A1-Ring. On the first day of testing, Heinz-Harald Frentzen led Sauber's Pedro Diniz. Alexander Wurz's car had a gearbox problem, limiting Benetton's testing time. Jaguar's Eddie Irvine was fastest on the second day. Arrows' Jos Verstappen was fastest on the final day of testing, although his car's front wing was damaged when his engine cover detached from its chassis. Ferrari and McLaren tested at the Mugello Circuit, concentrating on aerodynamic and suspension set-ups between 4 and 7 July. Ferrari spent an extra day at the Fiorano Circuit shaking down their cars with its test driver Luca Badoer. Williams and British American Racing (BAR) tested at the Circuito do Estoril from 5 to 7 July, with tyre, engine, aerodynamic and set-up optimisation.

Some teams modified their cars for the event. McLaren brought an extractor profile that had not been utilised in qualifying or the race at the French Grand Prix, as well as a tweaked rear suspension and a new Mercedes-Benz engine. Ferrari tweaked their car's aerodynamic profile and continued to test chimney stacks in free practice. BAR completed its package of aerodynamic modifications developed with Honda in a wind tunnel and introduced in France. The Jordan team's plan to debut their new car, the EJ10B, in Austria was delayed because its bodywork needed to pass Fédération Internationale de l'Automobile (FIA) safety tests. Jordan wanted to develop the car further and create more spare parts. However, this was the EJ10's final race before the EJ10B débuted at the next race.

== Practice ==
There were four practice sessions before Sunday's race: two one-hour sessions on Friday and two 45-minute sessions on Saturday. Friday's practice sessions were held in dry conditions. Within the first five minutes of the first practice session, 17 drivers completed explanatory laps. After 15 minutes, teams determined that there was enough grip for cars to be sent onto the track for examination. Lap times fell as the track's conditions improved and drivers re-acquainted themselves with it. Barrichello led the first session at 1:13.603 seconds, soon before the session ended, two-tenths of a second faster than Jordan's Jarno Trulli. BAR's Ricardo Zonta was third, followed by Verstappen, Michael Schumacher, Coulthard, Fisichella, Jaguar's Johnny Herbert, BAR's Jacques Villeneuve, and Sauber's Mika Salo. Häkkinen's car had a mechanical fuel pump failure that prompted him to stop at Remus Kurve corner, limiting him to one out lap and was slowest overall.

Coulthard lapped faster each time, setting the day's fastest lap, a 1:12.464, after running into the gravel during the second practice session. Häkkinen had a trouble free season and was second-fastest. Salo ran quicker during the session and was third-fastest. Michael Schumacher and Barrichello set the fourth and seventh quickest times, separated by Zonta and Trulli. Villeneuve, Diniz, and Fisichella rounded out the top ten. Ralf Schumacher's Williams car stopped five minutes into the session due to an electrical system failure that stalled his engine. Irvine slowed, entered Coulthard's path and the two drivers collided.

Irvine withdrew from the event after the second session. When he arrived at the circuit, he felt ill and was diagnosed with suspected appendicitis at the infield medical centre. On the advice of FIA medical delegate Sid Watkins, Irvine went to London for additional surgical consultation. According to hospital tests, Irvine experienced abdominal pain brought on by an enlarged intestine. He was replaced for the rest of the Grand Prix by Jaguar test driver Luciano Burti. Practice on Saturday morning sessions was held in dry weather, then later on a wet track with low grip, forcing some drivers onto the grass after sliding off the circuit. Häkkinen's time of 1:11.355 was the quickest in the third practice session, with Coulthard second. Both Ferrari drivers finished third and fourth, with Barrichello ahead of Michael Schumacher. Verstappen maintained his fast pace, finishing fifth fastest ahead of Fisichella and Villeneuve. Zonta, Trulli, and Herbert were ranked eighth to tenth. Burti was limited to one installation lap and would need to familiarise himself with the course during the final session.

Despite running a wheel on the grass exiting the uphill right-hand Jochen Rindt Kurve corner and getting beached in the gravel trap before the start/finish straight with ten minutes left in the final practice session, Häkkinen set the fastest lap, a 1:11.336, despite a brief heavy rain shower that barely affected proceedings 25 minutes in. His teammate Coulthard remained second-quickest. Michael Schumacher was third-fastest ahead of teammate Barrichello. Villeneuve was fifth-fastest, ahead of Herbert in sixth. Frentzen, seventh, was able to establish a comfortable setup after being one of the slowest drivers in the previous three practice sessions. Salo, Fisichella and Arrows' Pedro de la Rosa made up positions eight to ten. Zonta lost control of his vehicle and reversed back into the path of an incoming driver, who veered onto the grass to avoid him.

== Qualifying ==
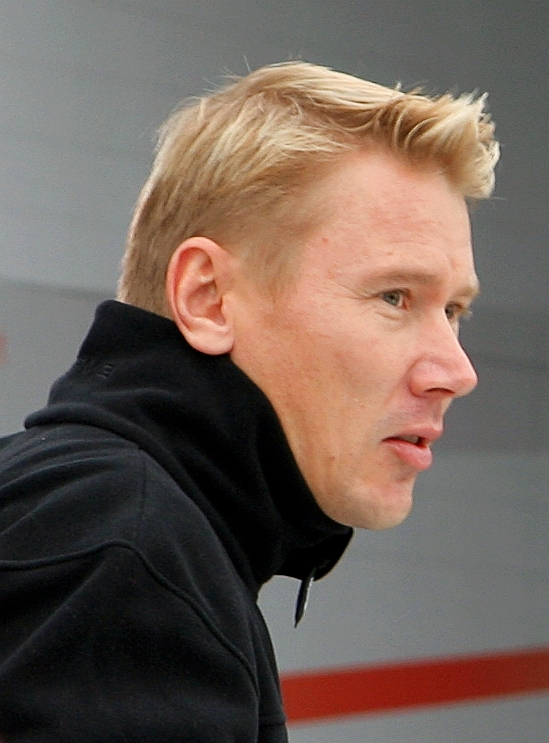
Mika Häkkinen (pictured in 2006) won his second race of the season, after starting from pole position.

During Saturday's one-hour qualifying session, each driver was limited to twelve laps, with the starting order determined by their fastest laps. The 107% rule was in force in qualifying, requiring each driver to stay within 107% of the quickest lap time in order to qualify for the race. Qualifying took place in overcast weather, that saw no major incidents. All cars except the Jordans immediately exited the pit lane to set lap times before a brief rainstorm hit sections of the circuit. After 15 minutes, the sun emerged from the clouds, reducing lap times. Häkkinen, after taking time off to de-stress after winning two World Championships, took his fourth pole position of the season, his first since the San Marino Grand Prix more than three months earlier, and the 25th of his career with a lap of 1:10.410 with parts of his teammate's racing setup. Teammate Coulthard joined him on the front row of the starting grid, being outqualifed for the first time since the European Grand Prix. Coulthard was three tenths of a second slower than Häkkinen. Coulthard believed he could have fought for pole position but lost time on his penultimate run after clipping a kerb entering Castrol Kurve. Both drivers were satisfied with their car's balance. Barrichello qualified third and briefly had pole position while using new tyres before the McLaren drivers recorded their best laps. He said that he altered his car's set-up of to enable him to lap faster. Michael Schumacher qualified fourth, six-tenths of a second behind Häkkinen, and observed uneven handling throughout the course due to a setup problem. During qualifying, he also had a high-speed spin at the second corner and aborted his final run after making a mistake at the exit of Gösser corner. Trulli qualified fifth, having set his quickest lap on soft compound tyres and the Jordan team determining no rain delay at the time.

New car aerodynamic packages put Zonta and Villeneuve sixth and seventh respectively, both drivers spun during the session. Fisichella, eighth, lost a bargeboard when he went off the track. He felt he could have started fifth but was slowed by a yellow flag. Salo and Verstappen were ninth and tenth. Diniz missed qualifying in the top ten by two-thousands of a second and spun off while setting lap times, triggering a yellow-flag. De la Rosa, 12th, struggled with the conditions during the session. He qualified ahead of Prost driver Nick Heidfeld and Wurz. Frentzen, 15th, used hard compound tyres and set his laps early in qualifying before track conditions improved. Frentzen explained that he did so because he expected rain near the end of qualifying. Herbert started from 16th after stopping on one run due to a broken left rear suspension caused by a loose suspension bracket at the Niki Lauda Kurve. A back wishbone was also flexing. Jean Alesi qualified his Prost car 17th. Jenson Button, 18th, used the spare Williams car set up for Ralf Schumacher since Button's race car experienced an engine failure, balance issues on the low-grip circuit, and slow-speed corners when on the harder tyre compound. Button also had difficulty driving the spare car. Ralf Schumacher, his teammate, qualified 19th, the Williams team's worst qualifying performance of the season. The two Minardi drivers of Marc Gené and Gastón Mazzacane experienced a lack of grip and qualified 20th and 22nd. Burti in 21st separated the two in his first Formula One qualifying session.

=== Qualifying classification ===
Pos	No	Driver	Constructor	Lap	Gap	Grid
1	1	(Finland) Mika Häkkinen	McLaren-Mercedes	1:10.410	—	1
2	2	(United Kingdom) David Coulthard	McLaren-Mercedes	1:10.795	+0.385	2
3	4	(Brazil) Rubens Barrichello	Ferrari	1:10.844	+0.434	3
4	3	(Germany) Michael Schumacher	Ferrari	1:11.046	+0.636	4
5	6	(Italy) Jarno Trulli	Jordan-Mugen-Honda	1:11.640	+1.230	5
6	23	(Brazil) Ricardo Zonta	BAR-Honda	1:11.647	+1.237	6
7	22	(Canada) Jacques Villeneuve	BAR-Honda	1:11.649	+1.239	7
8	11	(Italy) Giancarlo Fisichella	Benetton-Playlife	1:11.658	+1.246	8
9	17	(Finland) Mika Salo	Sauber-Petronas	1:11.761	+1.351	9
10	19	(Netherlands) Jos Verstappen	Arrows-Supertec	1:11.905	+1.495	10
11	16	(Brazil) Pedro Diniz	Sauber-Petronas	1:11.931	+1.521	11
12	18	(Spain) Pedro de la Rosa	Arrows-Supertec	1:11.978	+1.568	12
13	15	(Germany) Nick Heidfeld	Prost-Peugeot	1:12.037	+1.627	13
14	12	(Austria) Alexander Wurz	Benetton-Playlife	1:12.038	+1.628	14
15	5	(Germany) Heinz-Harald Frentzen	Jordan-Mugen-Honda	1:12.043	+1.633	15
16	8	(United Kingdom) Johnny Herbert	Jaguar-Cosworth	1:12.238	+1.828	16
17	14	(France) Jean Alesi	Prost-Peugeot	1:12.304	+1.894	17
18	10	(United Kingdom) Jenson Button	Williams-BMW	1:12.337	+1.927	18
19	9	(Germany) Ralf Schumacher	Williams-BMW	1:12.347	+1.937	19
20	20	(Spain) Marc Gené	Minardi-Fondmetal	1:12.722	+2.312	20
21	7	(Brazil) Luciano Burti	Jaguar-Cosworth	1:12.822	+2.412	PL
22	21	(Argentina) Gastón Mazzacane	Minardi-Fondmetal	1:13.419	+3.009	22
107% time: 1:15.339

== Warm-up ==
The drivers took to the track in cloudy, dry weather at 09:30 Central European Summer Time (UTC+2) for a 30-minute warm-up session. Barrichello set the session's fastest lap of 1:12.480 with two minutes remaining. Coulthard was second, and his teammate Häkkinen was third after being quickest until Barrichello's time. Verstappen finished fourth after leading after 15 minutes. Michael Schumacher was fifth in the other Ferrari. Zonta finished sixth, 1.1 second slower than Barrichello. No major incidents occurred in warm-up. Häkkinen went into the gravel at the final right turn. His teammate Coulthard ran wide at the same corner and slid onto the grass before requiring a new nose cone after colliding with a Jordan car.

== Race ==
The race, which commenced before 85,112 spectators at 14:00 local time, lasted 71 laps over 307.146 km (190.852 mi). Before the race, the weather was cool, dry and overcast. The air temperature ranged from 17 to 18 °C (63 to 64 °F) with the track temperature between 18 and 19 °C (64 and 66 °F); weather forecasts indicated a 30% chance of rain. Burti's car experienced a sudden drop in water pressure while on a reconnaissance lap, forcing him to start in his team's backup car from the pit lane exit. Michael Schumacher also drove his team's spare car. When the race began, Häkkinen maintained the lead into the first corner. Coulthard drove alongside his teammate, who was on the outside, but chose to remain second on the dirty inside of the track. The Ferrari duo had slow starts, bunching up the field behind them. Michael Schumacher was on the inside line, with Barrichello on the outside and Zonta close by, but braked alongside Barrichello and compromised his entry to turn one. Barrichello was reportedly instructed to let Schumacher through heading into turn two since his teammate was on a two-stop strategy. McLaren also used team orders, which allowed the driver who entered the first turn first to avoid being challenged.

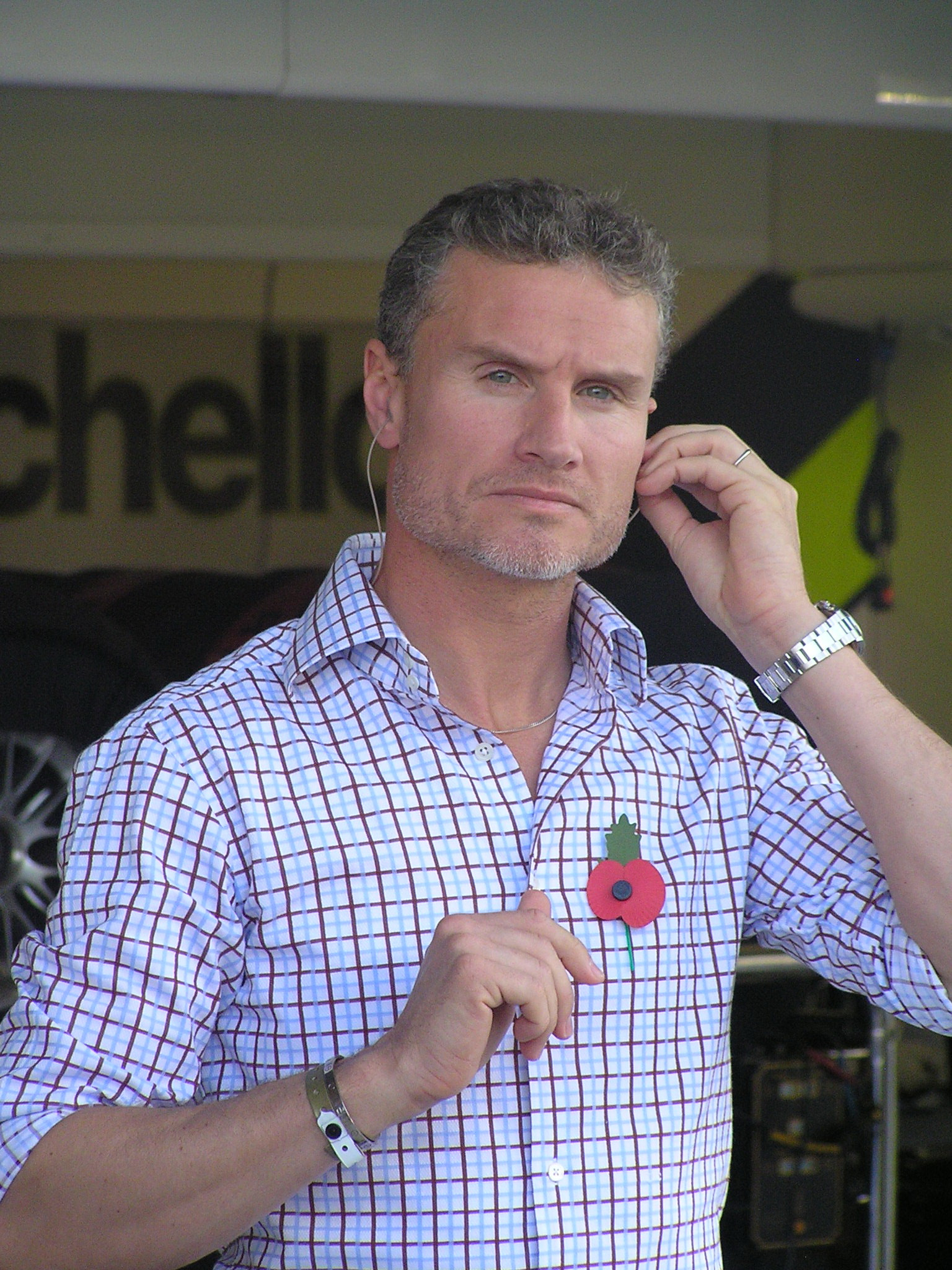
David Coulthard (pictured in 2009) finished second.

Further back, Diniz lost control of his car's rear after swerving to avoid hitting Verstappen ahead of him. Consequently, Diniz veered right across the track and into Fisichella on the inside at around 200 km/h (120 mph); Fisichella veered sharply right into the barrier. Ahead of them, Zonta outbraked himself and slammed into the rear of Michael Schumacher's car, sending Schumacher into a 180-degree spin. Schumacher stopped on the kerbs beside the outside grass. Trulli was close behind Barrichello and collided with the Ferrari's rear, sending Barrichello onto the gravel to avoid colliding with his teammate. Trulli struck Michael Schumacher's right-front suspension. Instead of driving straight, approaching drivers had to decide whether they wanted to steer left or right. Diniz collided with Salo's vehicle's sidepod when his teammate observed the wreckage and slowed, throwing Diniz into a spin. To avoid a collision, both the BAR and Prost drivers drove onto the gravel. Ralf Schumacher spun and stopped near Diniz and Fisichella's stationary vehicles but was able to restart his car and drive away.

Race director Charlie Whiting decided that the incident did not justify stopping the race and instead deployed the safety car. Michael Schumacher drove onto the centre of the track, anticipating a delay that would allow him to drive the spare car which did not happen. Marshals cleared debris and removed the stricken cars on the outside just off the racing line with recovery vehicles. The safety car was withdrawn at the conclusion of lap two and the race restarted with Häkkinen leading. Verstappen took 15.5 seconds to conduct a pit stop to replace a damaged front wing. Barrichello (nursing a damaged right-rear diffuser) and Frentzen overtook Button who fell to eighth on lap three. At the third lap's completion, the race order was Häkkinen, Coulthard, Salo, De la Rosa, Herbert, and Barrichello. Both McLaren drivers began to pull away from the rest of the field and exchanged fastest laps, as De la Rosa passed Salo for third at the start of lap four. Barrichello passed Herbert for fifth on that lap. With an engine failure on lap five, Frentzen's Jordan became the race's fourth retirement and spun off on oil that was dripping from his car. On the sixth lap, Verstappen set a new fastest lap as he quickly gained on Diniz in 17th place. Alesi overtook his teammate Heidfeld for tenth on the next lap.

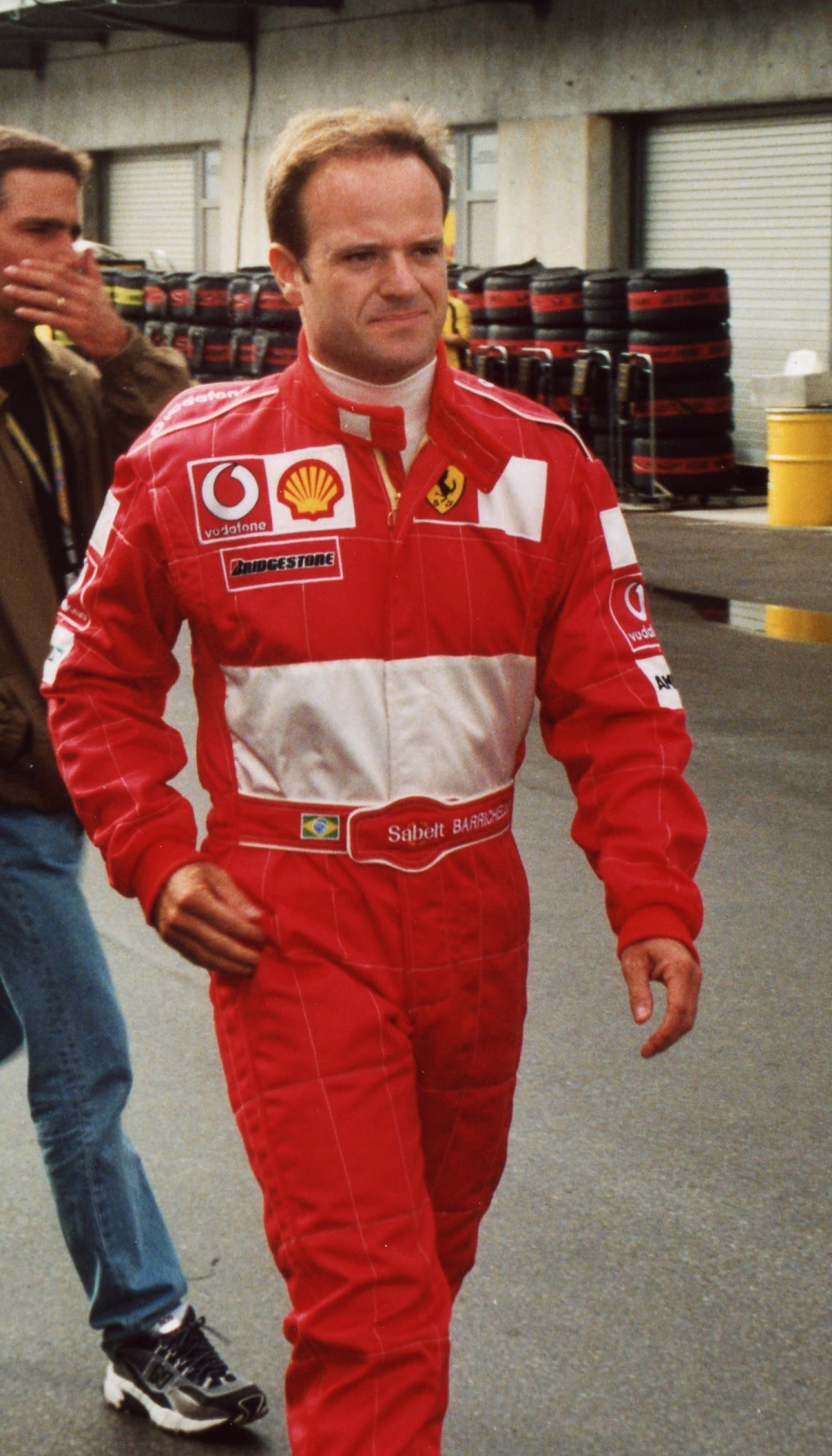
Rubens Barrichello (pictured in 2002) finished third after Pedro de la Rosa retired with mechanical problems.

By the eighth lap, Coulthard and De la Rosa were separated by five seconds because of Häkkinen's consistent fastest laps. Ralf Schumacher made a pit stop for a new front wing while Barrichello overtook Salo for fourth place on the same lap. Ralf Schumacher entered the garage for repairs to his left-front brake on the following lap. By lap 13, Häkkinen had a two-second lead over Coulthard, who was ten seconds ahead of De la Rosa. Although he was pulling away from Salo in fifth, Barrichello was six seconds behind De la Rosa. Verstappen became the race's fifth retirement on lap 15 due to gearbox failure. On lap 16, Diniz and Zonta were given ten-second stop-go penalties, both for their roles in the lap one accidents following a review of television coverage. They took their penalties immediately. Ralf Schumacher emerged from his garage to rejoin the race two laps later. Häkkinen's lead over Coulthard was increased to 10.9 seconds by lap 24. Alesi, who was on a two-stop strategy, became the first driver to make a scheduled pit stop on the same lap and exited the pit lane in 13th place. When Zonta attempted to pass Mazzacane at Castrol Kurve corner on lap 25, he collided with him, promoting Diniz to 14th.

By the 30th lap, Häkkinen had a 15.2-second advantage over Coulthard, his teammate, McLaren opted to slightly slow them by displaying pit boards instructing them to reduce their revolutions per minute to preserve their engines. After Arrows noticed unusually high gearbox temperatures on lap 33, De la Rosa retired from third place in the pit lane due to an gearbox oil leak. This moved Button to sixth position. Wurz dropped to tenth after running eighth by lap 34. Häkkinen's lead had grown to more than 17 seconds when he made his one and only pit stop on lap 38, emerging in second position. His teammate Coulthard led the next three laps before his sole pit stop on lap 42. Coulthard returned to the track behind Häkkinen, who was quick with a full tank of fuel and wanted to ensure that his teammate was not close enough to challenge for victory. Salo, Herbert, Barrichello, Button and Villeneuve all made pit stops over the next five laps. On lap 43, Alesi, who was 14th but had not yet completed his final pit stop, collided with teammate Heidfeld, and the two retired after an unsuccessful pass.

At the conclusion of lap 50, with the scheduled pit stops completed, the running order was Häkkinen, Coulthard, Barrichello, Villeneuve, Button, and Salo. Button ran wide challenging Villeneuve for fourth on lap 51 but remained ahead of Salo. On lap 60, Zonta experienced engine overheating issues and retired in the gravel at the Remus Kurve corner. Mazzacane was issued a 10-second stop-go penalty on that lap. He took his penalty on lap 61. Ralf Schumacher spun off the track due to brake failure and retired on the following lap. Coulthard recorded the race's fastest lap of 1:11.783 on lap 66, within nine seconds behind Häkkinen, who was slower on that lap, although it appeared that the latter would win comfortable. Häkkinen increased his lead to 12 seconds to prevent a formation finish, taking his second win of 2000 and 16th overall in 1'28:15.818, at an average speed of 208.792 km/h (129.737 mph). Coulthard finished second, 12.5 seconds behind, with Barrichello third. Villeneuve finished fourth by staying on the track longer than any other driver and setting quick laps, with Button close behind in fifth. Salo completed the points scorers in sixth. Herbert, Gené, Diniz and Wurz were in the next four positions, albeit one lap behind the winner, with Burti and Mazzacane the final classified finishers.

=== Post-race ===
The top three drivers appeared on the podium to receive their trophies and at the following press conference. Häkkinen expressed satisfaction with winning, believing it would help raise his confidence for the rest of the season. Häkkinen said that his team displaying pit boards left him confused whether he had a problem or was being told not to go faster. Coulthard stated that he was satisfied with the outcome of the first lap since it allowed him to race conservatively. He said that finishing second would not cause him to think about his potential of winning the Drivers' Championship. Barrichello explained that his car was loose from contact with Trulli early in the race, preventing him from challenging De la Rosa.

Villeneuve was pleased to finish fourth, stating that despite an inclement start, his strategy allowed him to go faster when there were no back markers slowing him. After Button came fifth, the Williams team principal Frank Williams commented on his performance, "Jenson really excelled himself again driving in difficult circumstances at the end of the race and under a lot of pressure". Salo earned his third points of the season after finishing fifth in the Monaco Grand Prix. While he was happy, he said he struggled with excess oversteer in the track's fast corners. De la Rosa believed he might have reached lap 37 while saving fuel by being on a lean fuel map before retiring. He praised his car and its engine, adding: "It was a shame really, because it would have been good to finish so high." Both Heidfeld and his Prost teammate Alesi attributed their lap 43 accident to poor communication with their team.

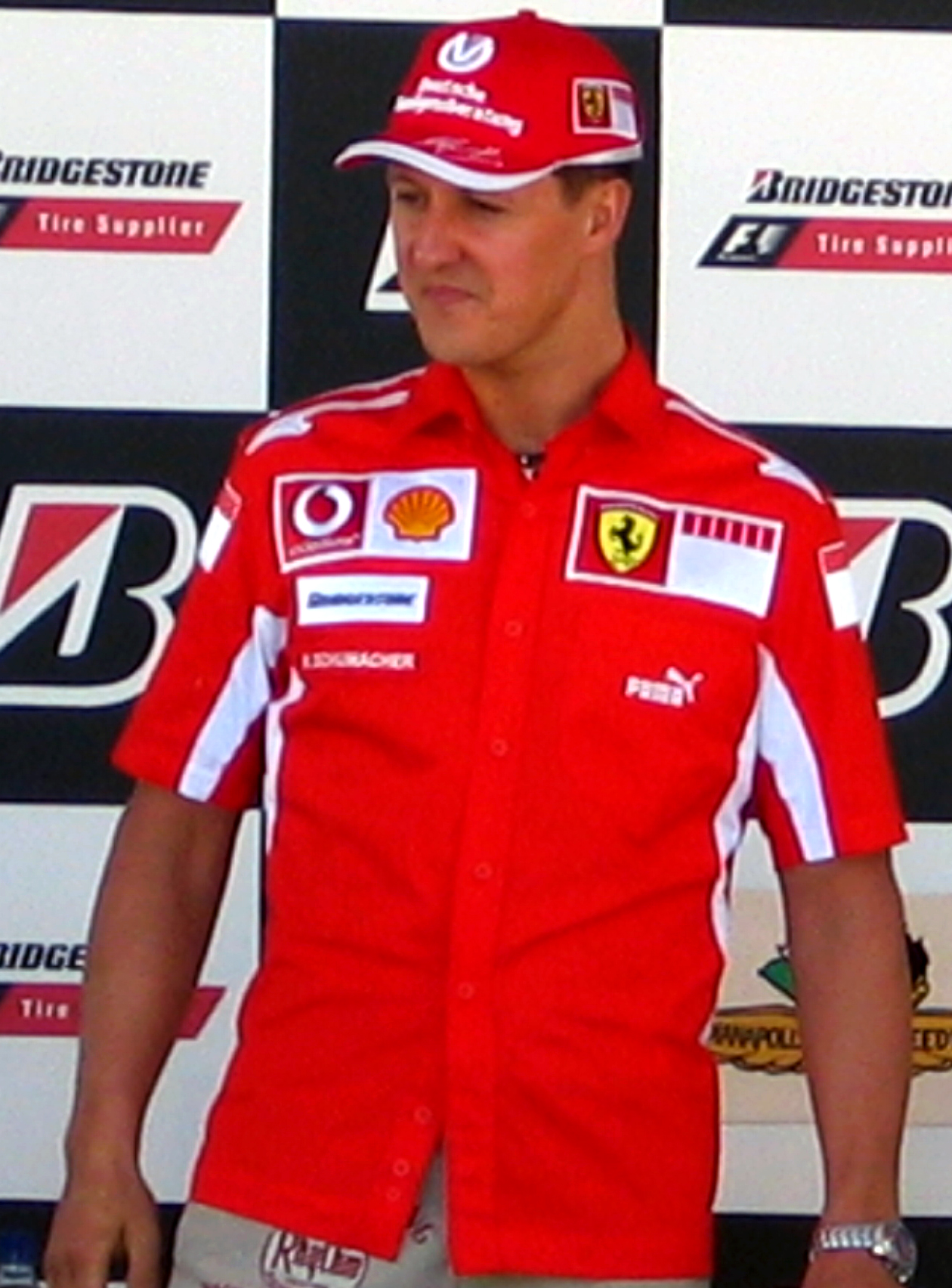
Michael Schumacher (pictured in 2005) retained the lead in the Drivers' Championship despite his first lap retirement.

The race should have been stopped, according to Michael Schumacher, who was involved in the first lap incident. He did, however, applaud the marshals who helped recover the cars involved. He also thought Zonta had "overestimated his ability" and promised to have a "quiet word" with him. Zonta believed the incident was not his fault and that Michael Schumacher braked harder than him, although he apologised for retiring from the race. He apologised to Schumacher via fax. Fisichella also agreed that the race should have been stopped, saying, "Three of the protagonists are out and it was stupid not to red flag." Benetton technical director Pat Symonds was outraged by the driver's actions, believing the team had lost vital points in the Constructors' Championship. He said: "The driving antics of some of our competitors at the first corner were appalling and ruined the race not only for many of the drivers but also for many of the spectators."

At a routine post-race inspection, the FIA investigated irregularities with Häkkinen's car after technical delegate Jo Bauer discovered a missing necessary paper seal on the electronic box. Additional samples from the electronic box (impounded by the FIA's technical delegates) were taken following the race; this was software downloaded that found no issues with the FIA's software coding. A spokesman for the McLaren team said: "No one changed the software, so there's no reason for us to be worried." The FIA concluded on July 25 that Häkkinen gained no competitive advantage from the missing seal and therefore Häkkinen's victory stood. McLaren, on the other hand, was deducted 10 points and fined $50,000 for violating Article 7 of the 2000 Formula One Sporting Regulations, which stipulated that competitors had to maintain some safety and eligibility criteria during the event. McLaren did not appeal the penalty, and managing director Martin Whitmarsh stated, "We now consider the matter closed." Norbert Haug, vice-president of Mercedes-Benz Motorsport, criticised the decision and believed that the seal was never applied to Häkkinen's car. Haug also said that he would not pursue the matter further.

Michael Schumacher's lead in the World Drivers' Championship decreased to six championship points as a result of his first-lap retirement. Coulthard was second with 50 championship points, two more than teammate Häkkinen and eight more than Barrichello. Fisichella retained fifth with 18 championship points despite not finishing. In the World Constructors' Championship, Ferrari maintained their lead with 92 championship points, while McLaren's 10-point penalty kept them second with 88 championship points. Williams moved third on 19 championship points, pushing Benetton into fourth on 18 championship points, and BAR overtook Jordan for fifth on 12 championship points, with seven rounds remaining in the season.

=== Race classification ===
Drivers who scored championship points are denoted in bold.

Pos	No	Driver	Constructor	Laps	Time/Retired	Grid	Points
1	1	(Finland) **Mika Häkkinen**	**McLaren-Mercedes**	71	1:28:15.818	1	10
2	2	(United Kingdom) **David Coulthard**	**McLaren-Mercedes**	71	+12.535	2	6
3	4	(Brazil) **Rubens Barrichello**	**Ferrari**	71	+30.795	3	4
4	22	(Canada) **Jacques Villeneuve**	**BAR-Honda**	70	+1 Lap	7	3
5	10	(United Kingdom) **Jenson Button**	**Williams-BMW**	70	+1 Lap	18	2
6	17	(Finland) **Mika Salo**	**Sauber-Petronas**	70	+1 Lap	9	1
7	8	(United Kingdom) Johnny Herbert	Jaguar-Cosworth	70	+1 Lap	16	
8	20	(Spain) Marc Gené	Minardi-Fondmetal	70	+1 Lap	20	
9	16	(Brazil) Pedro Diniz	Sauber-Petronas	70	+1 Lap	11	
10	12	(Austria) Alexander Wurz	Benetton-Playlife	70	+1 Lap	14	
11	7	(Brazil) Luciano Burti	Jaguar-Cosworth	69	+2 Laps	PL	
12	21	(Argentina) Gastón Mazzacane	Minardi-Fondmetal	68	+3 Laps	22	
Ret	23	(Brazil) Ricardo Zonta	BAR-Honda	58	Engine	6	
Ret	9	(Germany) Ralf Schumacher	Williams-BMW	52	Brakes/Spun off	19	
Ret	15	(Germany) Nick Heidfeld	Prost-Peugeot	41	Collision	13	
Ret	14	(France) Jean Alesi	Prost-Peugeot	41	Collision	17	
Ret	18	(Spain) Pedro de la Rosa	Arrows-Supertec	32	Gearbox/Engine	12	
Ret	19	(Netherlands) Jos Verstappen	Arrows-Supertec	14	Engine	10	
Ret	5	(Germany) Heinz-Harald Frentzen	Jordan-Mugen-Honda	4	Oil leak/Spun off	15	
Ret	3	(Germany) Michael Schumacher	Ferrari	0	Collision	4	
Ret	6	(Italy) Jarno Trulli	Jordan-Mugen-Honda	0	Collision	5	
Ret	11	(Italy) Giancarlo Fisichella	Benetton-Playlife	0	Collision	8	

== Championship standings after the race ==
Drivers' Championship standings

+/–	Pos	Driver	Points
	1	(Germany) Michael Schumacher	56
	2	(United Kingdom) David Coulthard	50
	3	(Finland) Mika Häkkinen	48
	4	(Brazil) Rubens Barrichello	36
	5	(Italy) Giancarlo Fisichella	18

Constructors' Championship standings

+/–	Pos	Constructor	Points
	1	(Italy) Ferrari	92
	2	(United Kingdom) McLaren-Mercedes	88
1	3	(United Kingdom) Williams-BMW	19
1	4	(Italy) Benetton-Playlife	18
1	5	(United Kingdom) BAR-Honda	12
Sources:

- Note: Only the top five positions are included for both sets of standings.

Previous race: 2000 French Grand Prix	FIA Formula One World Championship; 2000 season	Next race: 2000 German Grand Prix
Previous race: 1999 Austrian Grand Prix	Austrian Grand Prix	Next race: 2001 Austrian Grand Prix
