= 2000 French Grand Prix =

Formula One motor race held in 2000

Race 9 of 17 in the 2000 Formula One World Championship
← Previous race	Next race →

Race details
- Date: 2 July 2000
- Official name: LXXXVI Mobil 1 Grand Prix de France
- Location: Circuit de Nevers Magny-Cours, Magny-Cours, Burgundy, France
- Course: Permanent racing facility
- Course length: 4.251 km (2.641 miles)
- Distance: 72 laps, 305.886 km (190.069 miles)
- Weather: Sunny, dry, Air Temp: 27°C

Pole position
Driver	(Germany) Michael Schumacher	Ferrari
- Time: 1:15.632

Fastest lap
Driver	(United Kingdom) David Coulthard	McLaren-Mercedes
- Time: 1:19.479 on lap 28

Podium
First	(United Kingdom) David Coulthard	McLaren-Mercedes
Second	(Finland) Mika Häkkinen	McLaren-Mercedes
Third	(Brazil) Rubens Barrichello	Ferrari

The 2000 French Grand Prix (officially the LXXXVI Mobil 1 Grand Prix de France) was a Formula One motor race contested on 2 July 2000 at the Circuit de Nevers Magny-Cours in Magny-Cours, Burgundy, Central France, attended by 112,112 spectators. It was the 86th French Grand Prix and the ninth round of the 2000 Formula One World Championship. McLaren's David Coulthard won the 72-lap race after starting second. His teammate Mika Häkkinen finished second with Ferrari's Rubens Barrichello third.

Before the race, Michael Schumacher led the World Drivers' Championship and Ferrari led the World Constructors' Championship. Coulthard started the race alongside Michael Schumacher, who started from pole position after setting the fastest qualifying lap. Barrichello started third and passed Coulthard entering the first corner. Michael Schumacher retained his early lead and led after the first round of pit stops. During the race's second stint, Michael Schumacher began to struggle with tyre wear, allowing Coulthard to reduce the deficit and pass him on lap 40. Coulthard won the race after retaining his lead during the second round of pit stops. Michael Schumacher retired on lap 59 due to engine failure, advancing Häkkinen to second place. Barrichello finished third, followed by British American Racing driver Jacques Villeneuve in fourth.

Coulthard won his third race of the season and his eighth in Formula One, reduced Michael Schumacher's lead in the World Drivers' Championship to 12 championship points. Häkkinen remained third with 38 championship points, six more than Barrichello in fourth place. McLaren's one-two result in the World Constructors' Championship allowed them to close the deficit on Ferrari to six championship points with eight races remaining in the season.

== Background ==
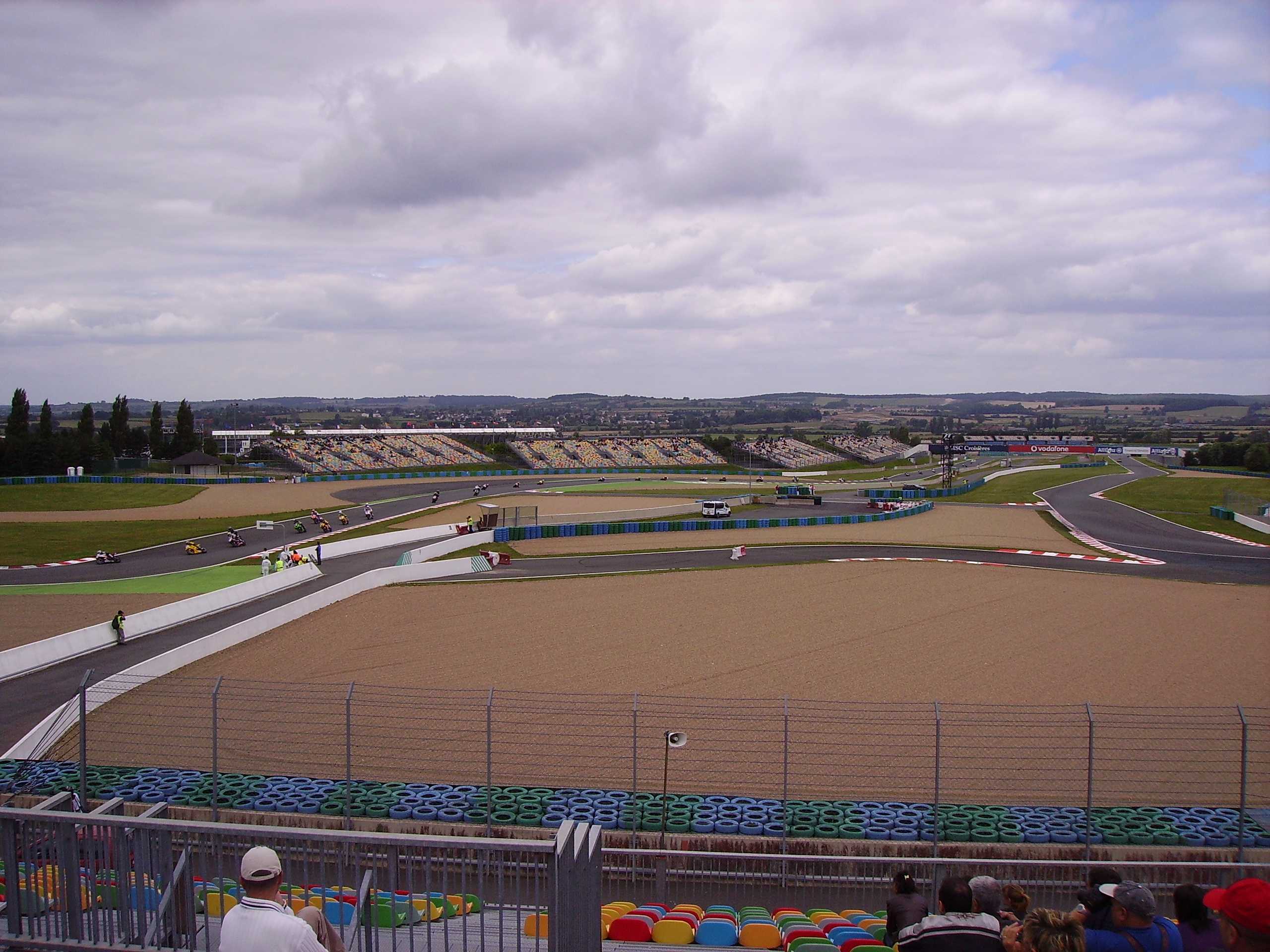
The Circuit de Nevers Magny-Cours (pictured in 2009), where the race was held

The 2000 French Grand Prix was the ninth of seventeen rounds in the 2000 Formula One World Championship, contested on 2 July 2000 at the 4.251 km (2.641 mi) clockwise Circuit de Nevers Magny-Cours in Magny-Cours, Burgundy, Central France. Sole tyre supplier Bridgestone delivered the more balanced and less grippy Soft and the faster Extra Soft dry compound tyres to the event. Bridgestone technical director Yoshihiko Ichikawa urged teams to use extra soft compounds instead of soft tyres because they provided more car grip and understeer was less noticeable at the Circuit de Nevers Magny-Cours than on rougher circuits. The event featured eleven teams (each representing a different constructor) with two drivers each, with no changes from the season entry list.

Ferrari's Michael Schumacher led the World Drivers' Championship with 56 championship points before the race, followed by McLaren's David Coulthard on 34 and his teammate Mika Häkkinen on 32. Ferrari's Rubens Barrichello was fourth with 28 championship points, with Benetton's Giancarlo Fisichella fifth with 18 championship points. Ferrari led the World Constructors' Championship with 84 championship points. McLaren and Benetton were second and third with 66 and 18 championship points, respectively, and Williams and Jordan were fourth and fifth with 15 and 10 championship points, respectively.

Following the Canadian Grand Prix on 18 June, the teams (except for Minardi due to a transport strike in Italy) tested at the track between 21 and 23 June to prepare for the upcoming French Grand Prix. Coulthard led the first day from McLaren test driver Olivier Panis. Arrows' Jos Verstappen lost control of his car after a mechanical failure and crashed into the barriers at turn two. Verstappen suffered neck strain and withdrew from testing. He was later cleared to compete in the Grand Prix. Coulthard remained fastest on the second day. as Fisichella damaged the underside of his car's chassis, limiting his testing time while Benetton repaired his car. On the final day of testing, Häkkinen was fastest. Michael Schumacher stopped on track as his Ferrari engine failed, necessitating the installation of a replacement engine into the chassis. On 27 June, Ferrari went to their private testing facility, the Fiorano Circuit, where test driver Luca Badoer conducted shakedown runs of three Ferrari F1-2000 cars and practised pit stops.

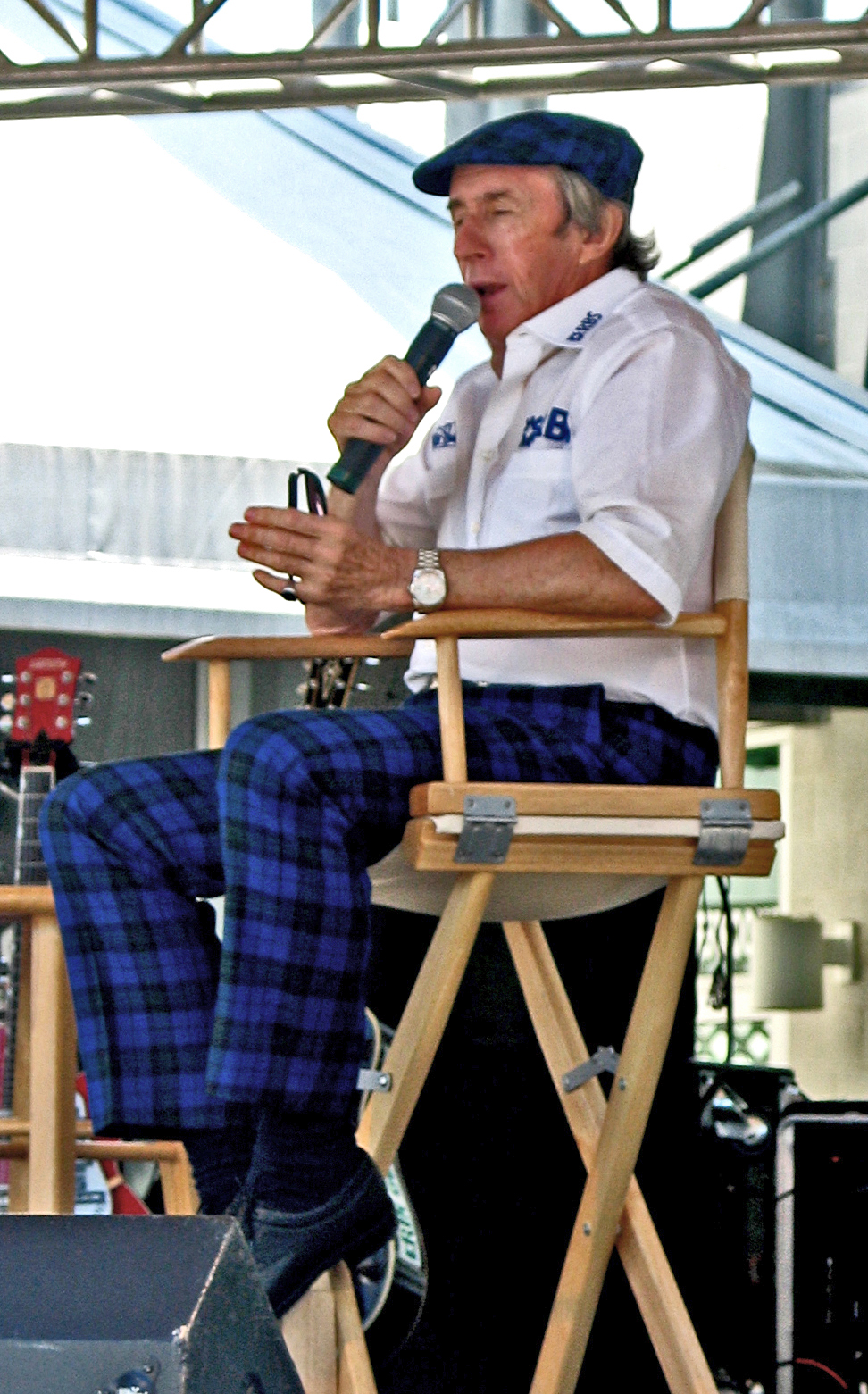
Jackie Stewart (pictured in 2005) backed David Coulthard to win the World Drivers' Championship following Mika Häkkinen's recent sub-par results.

After the Canadian Grand Prix, where he stalled on the grid before the formation lap before receiving a ten-second stop and go penalty because his mechanics worked on his car 15 seconds before the race started, Coulthard said that Ferrari could still be caught in the season's nine remaining races. He commented: "We have to look towards Magny-Cours and put this (Montreal) race behind us. The championship is not over yet and although we cannot change what happened in Canada, we can try to close the gap." After Häkkinen's recent sub-par results, British Racing Drivers' Club (BRDC) president and former world champion Jackie Stewart backed Coulthard to win the championship. Michael Schumacher, who had won five of the season's first eight races, was optimistic that his car would perform well on the track. Flavio Briatore, Benetton's team principal, downplayed his team's chances, saying: "We need a miracle to finish on the podium."

Almost every team modified their cars for the event. Ferrari introduced chimney stacks on the F1-2000 during free practice for the first time and additional vents to extract warm air for aerodynamic efficiency. The team reverted to previous specifications for qualifying and the race. It also modified the axle construction at the car's bottom with composite materials designed to minimise friction when it touched the asphalt surface. McLaren installed a new extractor profile for free practice and qualifying but removed it for warm-up and the race. It also asymmetrically positioned the rearview mirrors, the right placed further forward and lower than the left for improved visibility in the track's final corner. Sauber modified the sides' opening and British American Racing (BAR) installed a new body and ailerons. Peugeot provided Prost with an upgraded V10 engine for driver Jean Alesi, who slammed the engine's driveability. Jordan debuted a revised braking system.

== Practice ==
Before the race on Sunday, there were two one-hour sessions on Friday and two 45-minute sessions on Saturday. The Friday morning and afternoon practice sessions were held in hot, dry weather. Michael Schumacher set the first practice session's fastest lap at 1:16.474, two tenths of a second faster than Häkkinen. Prost's Nick Heidfeld was third, ahead Williams' Ralf Schumacher. Jaguar's Eddie Irvine and Johnny Herbert were fifth and seventh. Fisichella came in sixth, separating the two. Alesi, Arrows' Pedro de la Rosa, and Williams' Jenson Button were seventh through tenth. Only four drivers set timed laps after two-thirds had passed and fourteen others set one timed lap before returning to the pit lane. Just four drivers set no laps: Coulthard's car experienced a mechanical fuel pump issue, Barrichello drove one installation lap to preserve tyre use and both Jordan drivers sat out the session.

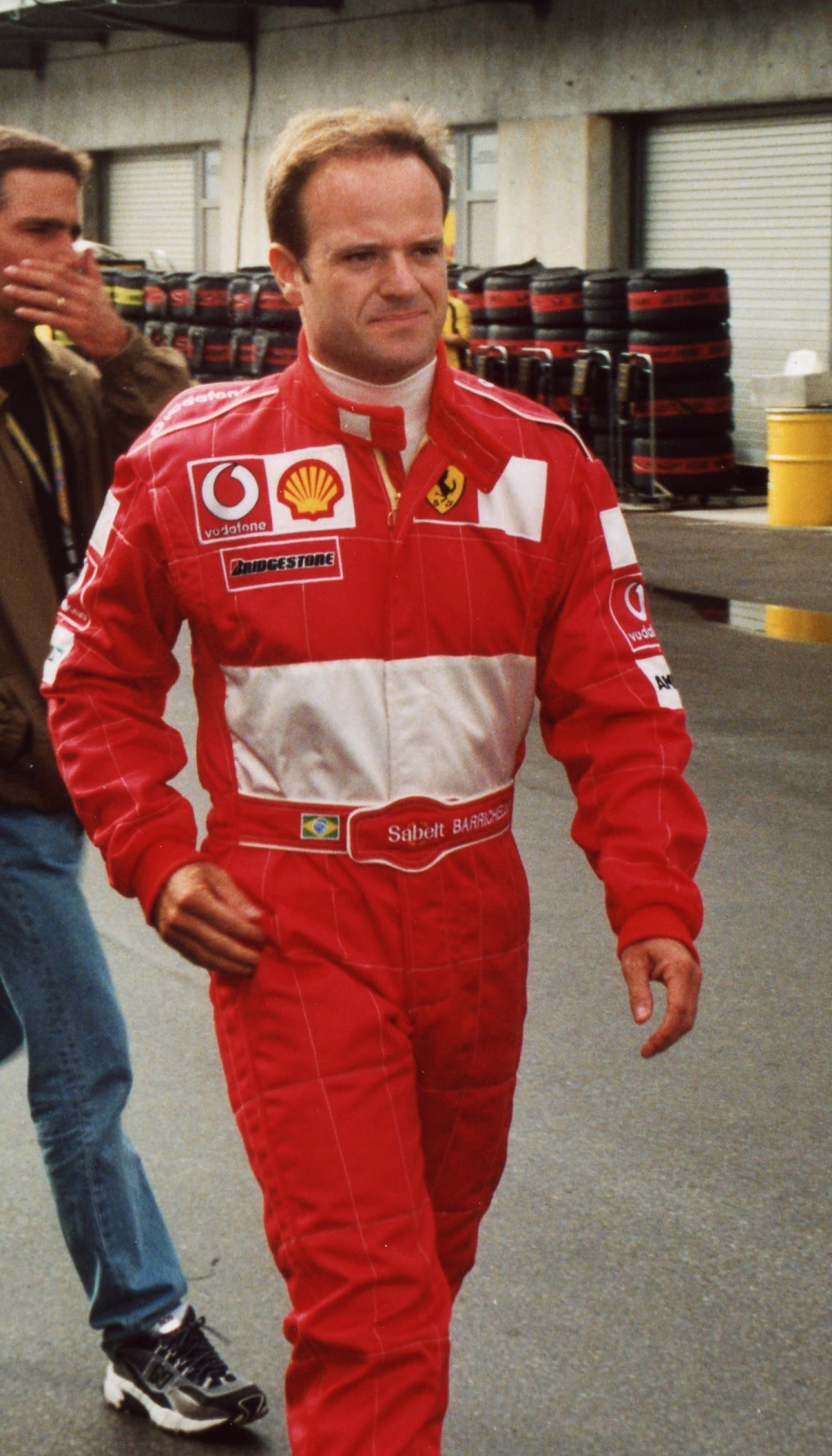
Rubens Barrichello (pictured in 2002) qualified in third position for the race

Coulthard led the second practice session with a lap of 1:16.253 despite losing 25 minutes due to an oil tank leak that his crew remedied by removing the engine in his car, limiting his running to four minutes; Häkkinen ended second fastest. Ferraris were second and fourth, with Michael Schumacher ahead of Barrichello. Sauber's Mika Salo was fifth fastest, ahead of Fisichella, Jordan's Jarno Trulli, Heidfeld, Ralf Schumacher and Trulli's teammate Heinz-Harald Frentzen in positions six through ten. The lack of grip at the tight last corner leading onto the pit lane straight caught out some drivers. The overall grip was poor around the course and BAR's Jacques Villeneuve and Ricardo Zonta beached their cars in the gravel trap. Trulli stalled attempting to simulate a standing start.

The weather remained dry and hot for the Saturday morning practice sessions. Every racer could drive on the circuit in preparation for qualifying later that day. Coulthard set the third session's fastest time, a 1:15.965, the first driver to lap faster than 1:16. Häkkinen was second fastest, almost two-tenths slower than Coulthard. Jordan teammates Trulli and Frentzen were both faster than the day before, with Trulli third and Frentzen fourth. Jaguar's Irvine was fifth and Herbert was eighth. Michael Schumacher and Button separated them. Barrichello and De la Rosa were ninth and tenth, respectively.

Coulthard was unable to improve his time in the last practice session due to an engine problem halfway down the track, forcing him to enter the pit lane with smoke billowing from his car, although remaining fastest overall. Because there was insufficient time to fix the problem during practise, Coulthard's mechanics replaced the engine in his vehicle for qualifying. Häkkinen lapped faster and remained second. Barrichello went quicker and was third fastest, ahead of Ralf Schumacher. Jordan drivers Trulli and Frentzen finished fifth and sixth, with best times two thousandths of a second apart. Irvine was seventh quickest, ahead of Michael Schumacher, who focused on qualifying setup. Button and Herbert were ninth and tenth.

== Qualifying ==
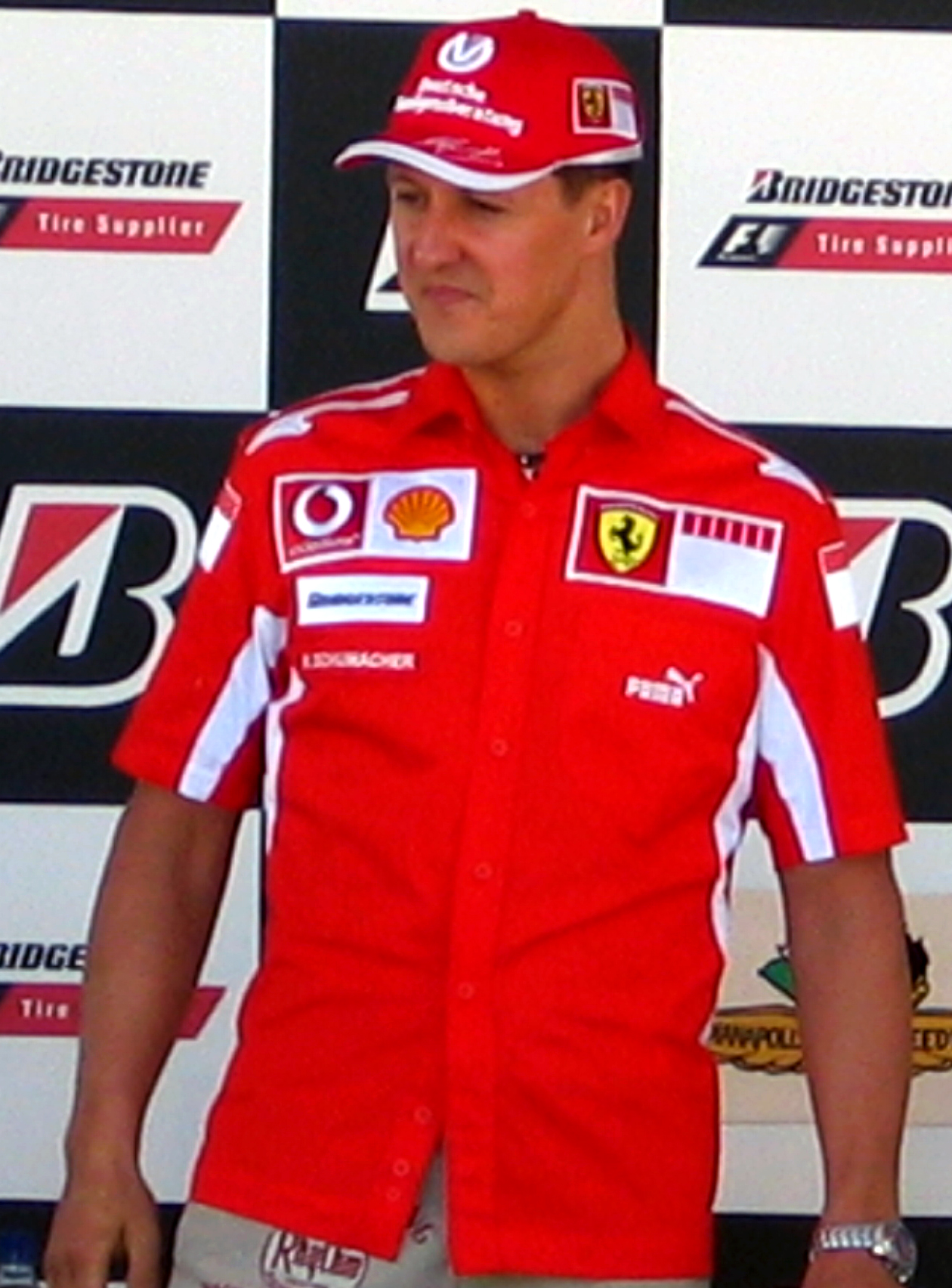
Michael Schumacher (pictured in 2005) secured his fourth pole position of the season.

Each driver was limited to twelve laps during Saturday's one-hour qualifying session, with the starting position determined by their fastest performance. The 107% rule was in force during this session, which required each driver to achieve a time within 107% of the fastest lap to qualify for the race. Qualifying was held in dry, hot weather, with temperatures periodically rising during the session. Michael Schumacher posted a time of 1:15.632, his fourth pole position of the season and the 27th of his career, around 25 minutes into the session. He was joined on the first row by Coulthard, whose fastest time was 0.102 seconds slower, and drove the spare McLaren vehicle for two laps while the team's mechanics replaced a defective fuel pump under the fuel tank. Coulthard was unable to lap quicker after spinning through 180 degrees, and the Fédération Internationale de l'Automobile (FIA) ordered him to undergo a car weight inspection in the pit lane. Barrichello secured third after changing his car's set-up in qualifying, which caused uncertainty over ride height changes. Häkkinen was demoted to fourth by Barrichello on the final lap due to difficulty in the slow speed turns from setup problems. Late in qualifying, Ralf Schumacher qualified fifth and was pleased with his starting position. He demoted Irvine to sixth place in the final phases of qualifying. Villeneuve qualified seventh.

Jordan's Trulli and Frentzen were eighth and ninth. Both drivers were disappointed with their performance; Trulli went wide off the course and returned via the off surface, preventing him from lapping faster. Button qualified tenth. Herbert in eleventh failed to qualify in the top ten by nearly three-tenths of a second. Salo took twelfth, with his fastest time posted when cloud cover reduced air and track temperatures. He was ahead of De la Rosa in 13th position in the quicker of the two Arrows; he electronics system failed, and he returned to the pit lane to drive the spare Arrows car. Fisichella started 14th due to car balance and tyre wear, nearly one-tenth of a second faster than Benetton teammate Alexander Wurz; both drivers reported car grip issues. Pedro Diniz in the other Sauber and Heidfeld split the two. Alesi followed in 18th. Zonta, 19th, used BAR's spare car after his racing car's engine failed. A lack of grip left Verstappen in 20th. Minardi's Marc Gené and Gastón Mazzacane qualified at the back of the grid in places 21 to 22; both drivers were 2.4 and 2.6 seconds slower than the pole sitter, respectively, Minardi's best qualifying performance from first position up to that point in the season.

=== Post-qualifying ===
After qualifying but before the warm-up session, the FIA safety delegate Charlie Whiting announced that he had banned practice starts at the pit lane exit after observing driver behaviour in the area during the Saturday free practice sessions.

=== Qualifying classification ===
Pos	No	Driver	Constructor	Time	Gap
1	3	(Germany) Michael Schumacher	Ferrari	1:15.632	—
2	2	(United Kingdom) David Coulthard	McLaren-Mercedes	1:15.734	+0.102
3	4	(Brazil) Rubens Barrichello	Ferrari	1:16.047	+0.415
4	1	(Finland) Mika Häkkinen	McLaren-Mercedes	1:16.050	+0.418
5	9	(Germany) Ralf Schumacher	Williams-BMW	1:16.291	+0.659
6	7	(United Kingdom) Eddie Irvine	Jaguar-Cosworth	1:16.399	+0.767
7	22	(Canada) Jacques Villeneuve	BAR-Honda	1:16.653	+1.021
8	5	(Germany) Heinz-Harald Frentzen	Jordan-Mugen-Honda	1:16.658	+1.026
9	6	(Italy) Jarno Trulli	Jordan-Mugen-Honda	1:16.669	+1.037
10	10	(United Kingdom) Jenson Button	Williams-BMW	1:16.905	+1.273
11	8	(United Kingdom) Johnny Herbert	Jaguar-Cosworth	1:17.176	+1.544
12	17	(Finland) Mika Salo	Sauber-Petronas	1:17.233	+1.591
13	18	(Spain) Pedro de la Rosa	Arrows-Supertec	1:17.279	+1.647
14	11	(Italy) Giancarlo Fisichella	Benetton-Playlife	1:17.317	+1.685
15	16	(Brazil) Pedro Diniz	Sauber-Petronas	1:17.361	+1.729
16	15	(Germany) Nick Heidfeld	Prost-Peugeot	1:17.374	+1.742
17	12	(Austria) Alexander Wurz	Benetton-Playlife	1:17.408	+1.776
18	14	(France) Jean Alesi	Prost-Peugeot	1:17.569	+1.937
19	23	(Brazil) Ricardo Zonta	BAR-Honda	1:17.668	+2.036
20	19	(Netherlands) Jos Verstappen	Arrows-Supertec	1:17.933	+2.301
21	20	(Spain) Marc Gené	Minardi-Fondmetal	1:18.130	+2.498
22	21	(Argentina) Gastón Mazzacane	Minardi-Fondmetal	1:18.302	+2.670
107% time: 1:20.926

== Warm-up ==
The drivers took to the track at 09:30 Central European Summer Time (UTC+2) for a 30-minute warm-up session, in sunny weather. Overnight rain left the asphalt surface slippery, but the sun dried it up as the session went; lap time were significantly slower than the previous two days. To begin the session, teams fitted wet tyres on their cars before switching to dry compound tyres when lap times decreased and the circuit's condition improved. Drivers modified their car's setups and some reported issues. Häkkinen set the fastest time of 1:19.329 with two minutes remaining. Coulthard was second in the other McLaren, with Michael Schumacher third and Trulli fourth. Michael Schumacher drove both the spare and race Ferraris, adjusting settings to the changing track conditions. Some drivers lost control of their cars on the slippery track, and Frentzen damaged a semi-axle by going off the circuit.

== Race ==
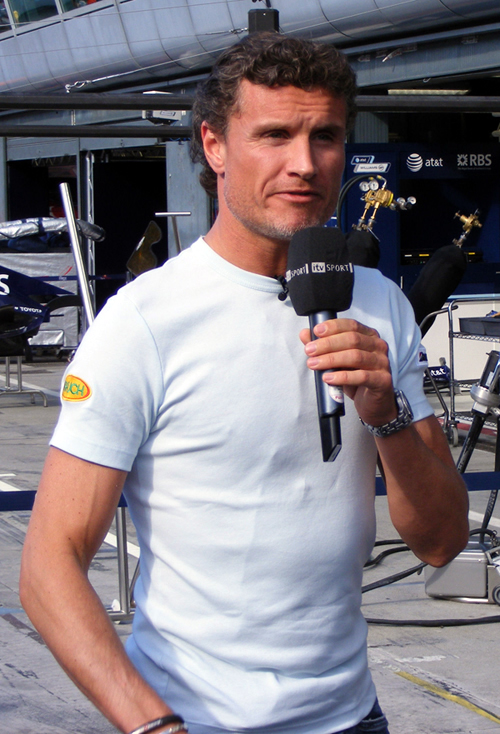
David Coulthard (pictured in 2007) took his third win of the 2000 season.

The 72-lap event had a distance of 306.072 km (190.184 mi), and began before 112,112 spectators at 14:00 local time. The weather for the race was dry and sunny; the air temperature ranged from 27 to 28 °C (81 to 82 °F) and the track temperature was between 38 and 39 °C (100 and 102 °F); conditions were expected to remain consistent throughout the race with 40% chance of rain. Every driver began on the Extra Soft dry compound tyres. Driver tyre usage and car setup modifications affected compound wear. Autosport wrote that "the key to the French GP was always going to be the start" due to the short pit lane straight leading into a fast left-hand corner rather than having a heavy braking zone. It observed: "For the drivers in the even numbered grid positions, on the inside line, it's always a bit difficult. The cars on the outside have a better run at the first turn, and can gain ground by sweeping across in front of those caught on the inside." Coulthard removed the rear aerofoil tailplane to reduce the effect of an understeer and increase his top speed.

While Coulthard made the best start of the leading runners, Michael Schumacher moved left and into his path to retain the lead. Coulthard then moved to his right but was blocked and slowed to avoid a collision, allowing Barrichello past for second. Salo had the strongest start in the field, going from twelfth to ninth by the end of the first lap, while Irvine fell four positions and Ralf Schumacher dropped from fifth to seventh. At the first lap's completion, the top six drivers were Michael Schumacher, Barrichello, Coulthard, Häkkinen, Villeneuve, and Frentzen. Michael Schumacher began to pull away from the field during the first laps, setting successive fastest laps. Barrichello began delaying the McLaren drivers to help his teammate extend his lead. On lap two, Trulli overtook Ralf Schumacher for seventh and Alesi passed Heidfeld for 14th. On the following lap, Ralf Schumacher retook seventh from Trulli. Heidfeld lost a further position to Fisichella on lap four. Ralf Schumacher began challenging Frentzen for sixth on the fifth lap.

Michael Schumacher increased his advantage over Barrichello to five seconds by lap ten. Button took tenth position from Irvine on lap twelve, while Heidfeld collided with Alesi at the Adelaide hairpin while attempting to overtake Fisichella, sending his teammate into a spin and dropping to 18th. Button overtook Salo for ninth on lap 13. Zonta, who was running 17th, experienced braking troubles on lap 17 and struck the tyre barriers, forcing him to retire from the Grand Prix. By the 18th lap, Michael Schumacher had extended his lead over Barrichello to 6.2 seconds, who continued to hold up Coulthard in third. Häkkinen was 1.4 seconds behind his teammate but pulling away from Villeneuve in fifth. Herbert retired three laps later after making an unscheduled pit stop due to a gearbox issue that gradually lost his use of all gears. On the same lap, Alesi became the first driver to pit for tyres.

Trulli became the first front runner to pit on lap 21, followed by Villeneuve, Frentzen, and Ralf Schumacher. On lap 22, Coulthard passed Barrichello for second place exiting the Adelaide hairpin. With Barrichello blocking the inside line under braking, Coulthard entered the hairpin wide, taking a late apex and accelerating early to overtake Barrichello cleanly on the inside on the exit of the corner. Häkkinen, Button, Michael Schumacher, Coulthard, and Barrichello all made pit stops over the following three laps. Verstappen retired at the side of the pit straight on lap 26 due to gearbox issues. Coulthard was able to close up to Michael Schumacher to less than a second by lap 32, having recorded the race's fastest lap, a 1:19.479 on the 28th lap; the latter was struggling with his tyres in the warm climate. He on the outside attempted to overtake Michael Schumacher on the inside two laps later but Schumacher defended his position. Coulthard slowed to avoid a collision and gave Michael Schumacher the middle finger in his immediate anger. The manoeuvre allowed Häkkinen to close up on the pair. Mazzacane spun off at the third corner on the previous lap and retired. Wurz's brakes locked up entering turn 15, causing him to beach his car in the gravel trap and retire on lap 36. Button became the first driver to pit twice on lap 39.

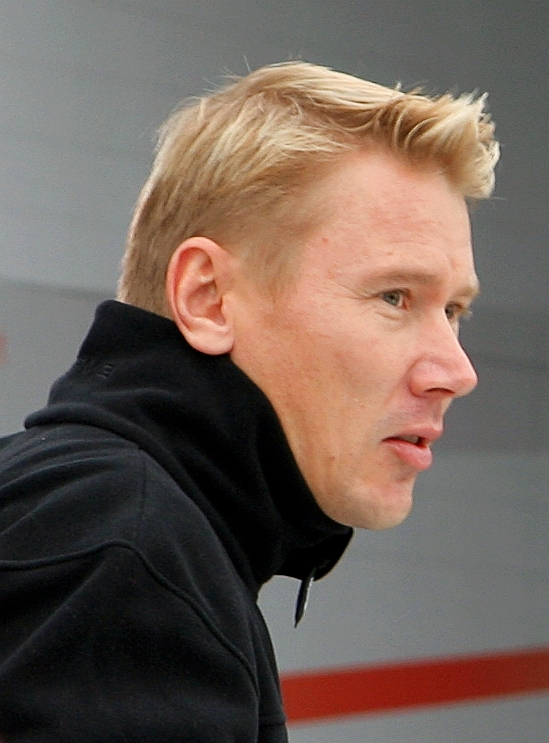
Mika Häkkinen (pictured in 2006) finished in second position.

Coulthard went to the inside of Michael Schumacher (who had heavily worn tyres) in the Adelaide hairpin as Schumacher steered wide to cover. After forcing Michael Schumacher into the outside verge of the corner exit, he took the lead on lap 40. Michael Schumacher's right front wheel made slight contact with Coulthard's left rear tyre exiting the hairpin. Michael Schumacher then promptly withstood Häkkinen's overtaking attempts. Frentzen and De la Rosa became the next two drivers to make pit stops on the same lap. Michael Schumacher and Häkkinen made pit stops for the second time on lap 43 and both emerged in third and fourth respectively. Barrichello's pit stop on the 44th lap lasted 16.8 seconds and dropped him to fifth because his team had trouble fitting a cross threaded wheel nut on his right front tyre. This eliminated Barrichello from contention for the victory. De la Rosa retired in the pit lane with transmission failure after completing 45 laps. Coulthard entered the pit lane at the conclusion of the 46th lap for his final 7.9-second pit stop. He rejoined in the lead, three seconds ahead of Michael Schumacher.

After the front-runners finished their pit stops, the first six drivers on lap 48 were Coulthard, Michael Schumacher, Häkkinen, Barrichello, Villeneuve, and Trulli. On lap 52, towards the back of the field, Gené and Alesi collided, sending both cars spinning sideways. Both drivers maintained their respective positions. Further up, Ralf Schumacher passed Trulli at turn five for sixth. By lap 53, Häkkinen was less than a second behind Michael Schumacher and continued to battle him for second as his tyres degraded faster than the McLarens. Irvine overtook Diniz for twelfth position two laps later. On the 58th lap, Häkkinen was close behind Michael Schumacher and nearly outdragged him at the exit of Lycee corner. Michael Schumacher ran wide to hold off Häkkinen. Häkkinen passed Michael Schumacher on lap 59 after the latter drove wide when his rear wheels locked braking for the Adelaide hairpin. Michael Schumacher retired with a sudden engine failure on the same lap.

Coulthard slowed slightly because he felt his lead was safe. He crossed the finish line in 1'38:05.538, at an average speed of 187.100 km/h (116.259 mph), for his third victory of the season and eighth of his Formula One career. Häkkinen finished second 14.7 seconds later, ahead of Barrichello in third, Villeneuve in fourth, Ralf Schumacher in five, and Trulli the final points scorer in sixth. Frentzen in seventh held off Button in eighth place who was being closed up to Fisichella in ninth during the race's final laps. Salo, Diniz, and Heidfeld followed in the next three positions, with Irvine, Alesi, and Gené the final classified finishers.

=== Post-race ===
The top three drivers collected their trophies on the podium and spoke at the press conference that followed. Coulthard described his race weekend as "exhausting" due to issues his team had to face. He also apologised for making hand motions at Michael Schumacher during his initial overtaking manoeuvre on him. Häkkinen expressed satisfaction to finish second and applauded his team's efforts. He also mentioned watching Michael Schumacher's racing lines and believing he might have passed him if he had not retired due to an engine failure. Barrichello said that Ferrari told him to slow in the race's closing stages since he had a 35-second lead over Villeneuve.

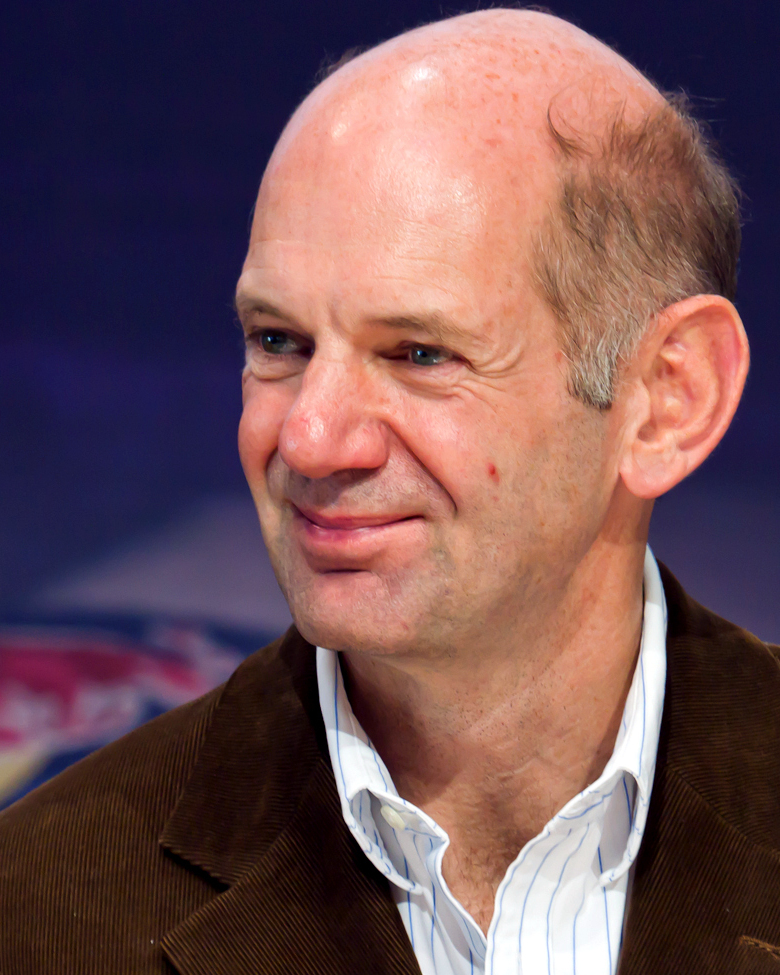
Adrian Newey (pictured in 2011) mentioned that the pit stop strategy was critical to winning the Grand Prix.

After Ferrari's victory at the previous race, their team principal Jean Todt, said that "we seemed to be in a strong position but, of course, it is the order at the finish that counts", while Michael Schumacher said that his car's tyres dropped in performance following his first pit stop. McLaren technical director Adrian Newey said that the pit stop strategy was crucial in winning the race. He commented: "The tyre wear did not spring any surprises on us and we were able to trust our estimations and co-ordinate the pit-stops to our best advantage." Villeneuve was happy to finish fourth and was surprised by his good start. Heidfeld, who collided with his teammate Alesi during the race, apologised for the collision. Ralf Schumacher said that he slowed to secure fifth place. Trulli described his race as "difficult" because of the hot temperatures but praised his mechanics for their work.

After the race, Coulthard's overtaking manoeuvres on Michael Schumacher drew much media attention. Coulthard accused Michael Schumacher of unsporting behaviour and dangerous driving, saying: "I had a clean run at Michael on the outside and equally I felt he drove me wide. You could say he has the right to do that because he has track position. I'm not arguing against that. I just don't think Michael is very sporting." Michael Schumacher later denied any misconduct, citing a similar incident at the 1999 Japanese Grand Prix in which Coulthard pushed him wide with no objections raised. He also admitted to not seeing Coulthard's hand gesture. Coulthard sought clarification with the FIA over such overtakes, with a source from Formula One's governing body commenting: "It was hard racing – they are racing drivers aren't they?" When asked by a journalist if Coulthard's gesture was unsporting and gave young racing fans the wrong impression, Mercedes' head of motorsport Norbert Haug replied: "You don't understand, in motor-racing, that is a traditional gesture used to indicate to the driver ahead that you intend to overtake him in one lap's time." According to GrandPrix.com, Coulthard's overtake showed that he "is ready to stand up to Michael and is not afraid of what will happen if Michael does not lift."

FIA president Max Mosley stated that Michael Schumacher's single swerving action at the start of the race was "more of a convention" agreed upon by drivers rather than a formal regulation, adding: "They are all grown men at the height of their profession. However, where we would get involved is if the move was totally outrageous and deemed to be dangerous." Coulthard said he interpreted the regulations to mean that a driver intentionally going across the track to block another racer deserved a penalty or disqualification. He stated that he would raise the subject at the drivers' meeting prior to the following Austrian Grand Prix but not with Michael Schumacher directly. The consequence of the drivers' meeting was that Michael Schumacher would be allowed to continue swerving to protect the race lead at the start of Grands Prix after an agreement that would have resulted in a ban on such tactics was not reached when Ralf Schumacher supported his brother.

The race resulted in Coulthard closing the World Drivers' Championship gap to Michael Schumacher to 12 championship points because of Schumacher's retirement from the race. Häkkinen remained third, six championship points clear of Barrichello. Fisichella remained in fifth. McLaren's one-two finish cut Ferrari's lead in the World Constructors' Championship to six championship points. Williams had gained two championship points on Benetton but were still one championship point behind. Jordan maintained fifth place with 11 championship points, with eight races remaining in the season.

=== Race classification ===
Drivers who scored championship points are denoted in bold.

Pos	No	Driver	Constructor	Laps	Time/Retired	Grid	Points
1	2	(United Kingdom) **David Coulthard**	**McLaren-Mercedes**	72	1:38:05.538	2	10
2	1	(Finland) **Mika Häkkinen**	**McLaren-Mercedes**	72	+14.748	4	6
3	4	(Brazil) **Rubens Barrichello**	**Ferrari**	72	+32.409	3	4
4	22	(Canada) **Jacques Villeneuve**	**BAR-Honda**	72	+1:01.322	7	3
5	9	(Germany) **Ralf Schumacher**	**Williams-BMW**	72	+1:03.981	5	2
6	6	(Italy) **Jarno Trulli**	**Jordan-Mugen-Honda**	72	+1:15.605	9	1
7	5	(Germany) Heinz-Harald Frentzen	Jordan-Mugen-Honda	71	+1 lap	8	
8	10	(United Kingdom) Jenson Button	Williams-BMW	71	+1 lap	10	
9	11	(Italy) Giancarlo Fisichella	Benetton-Playlife	71	+1 lap	14	
10	17	(Finland) Mika Salo	Sauber-Petronas	71	+1 lap	12	
11	16	(Brazil) Pedro Diniz	Sauber-Petronas	71	+1 lap	15	
12	15	(Germany) Nick Heidfeld	Prost-Peugeot	71	+1 lap	16	
13	7	(United Kingdom) Eddie Irvine	Jaguar-Cosworth	70	+2 laps	6	
14	14	(France) Jean Alesi	Prost-Peugeot	70	+2 laps	18	
15	20	(Spain) Marc Gené	Minardi-Fondmetal	70	+2 laps	21	
Ret	3	(Germany) Michael Schumacher	Ferrari	58	Engine	1	
Ret	18	(Spain) Pedro de la Rosa	Arrows-Supertec	45	Transmission	13	
Ret	12	(Austria) Alexander Wurz	Benetton-Playlife	34	Spun off	17	
Ret	21	(Argentina) Gastón Mazzacane	Minardi-Fondmetal	31	Spun off	22	
Ret	19	(Netherlands) Jos Verstappen	Arrows-Supertec	25	Transmission	20	
Ret	8	(United Kingdom) Johnny Herbert	Jaguar-Cosworth	20	Gearbox	11	
Ret	23	(Brazil) Ricardo Zonta	BAR-Honda	16	Spun off	19	

== Championship standings after the race ==
Drivers' Championship standings

+/–	Pos	Driver	Points
	1	(Germany) Michael Schumacher	56
	2	(United Kingdom) David Coulthard	44
	3	(Finland) Mika Häkkinen	38
	4	(Brazil) Rubens Barrichello	32
	5	(Italy) Giancarlo Fisichella	18

Constructors' Championship standings

+/–	Pos	Constructor	Points
	1	(Italy) Ferrari	88
	2	(United Kingdom) McLaren-Mercedes	82
	3	(Italy) Benetton-Playlife	18
	4	(United Kingdom) Williams-BMW	17
	5	(Republic of Ireland) Jordan-Mugen-Honda	11
Sources:

- Note: Only the top five positions are included for both sets of standings.

Previous race: 2000 Canadian Grand Prix	FIA Formula One World Championship; 2000 season	Next race: 2000 Austrian Grand Prix
Previous race: 1999 French Grand Prix	French Grand Prix	Next race: 2001 French Grand Prix
