= Norbert Haug =

German journalist (born 1952)

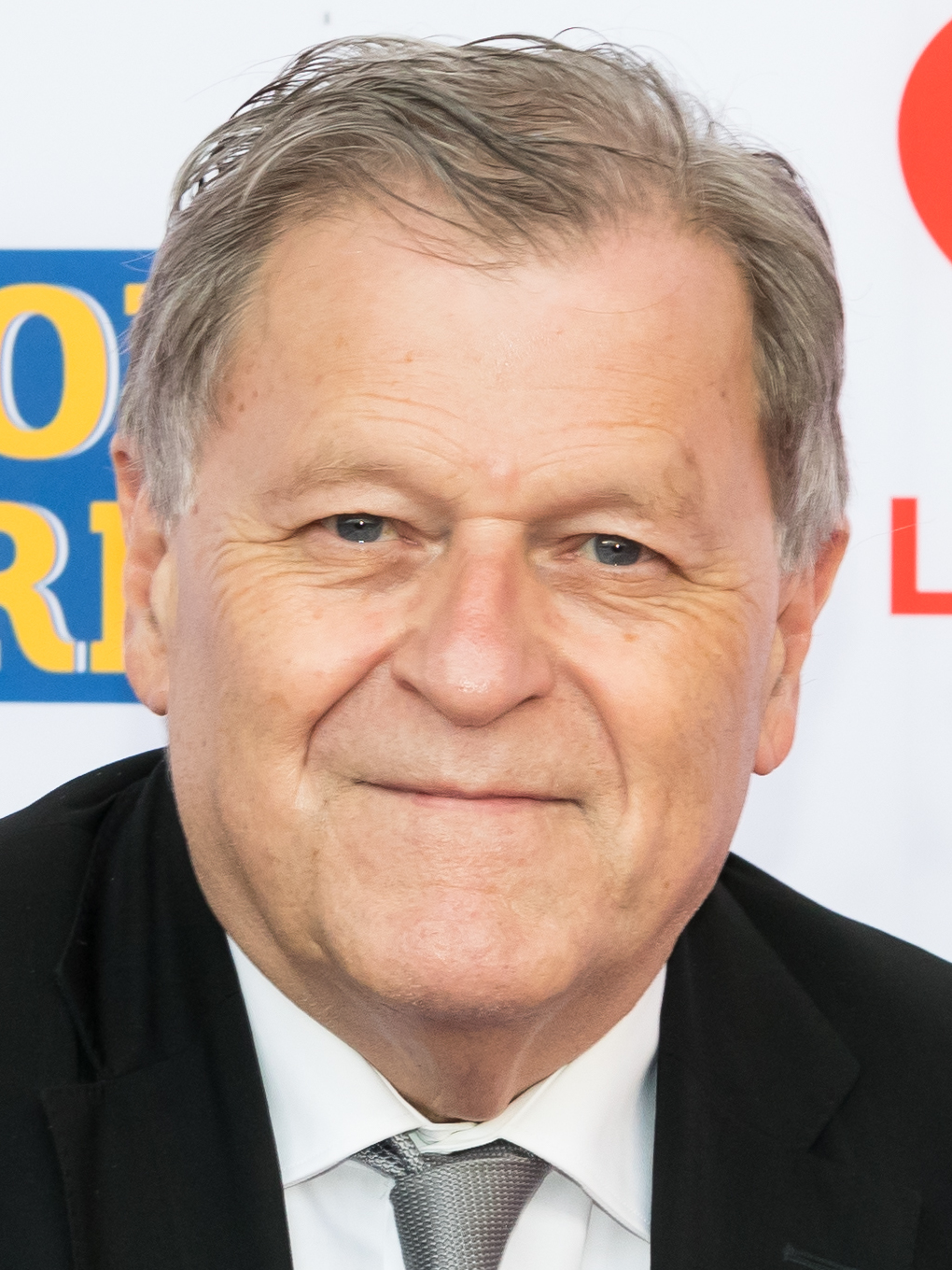
- Haug in 2019
- Born: Norbert Friedrich Haug; 24 November 1952 (age 73); Engelsbrand, West Germany
- Occupation: Journalist
- Known for: Vice President Mercedes-Benz Motorsport
- Successor: Toto Wolff
- Spouse: Married
- Children: 1 daughter

Norbert Friedrich Haug (born 24 November 1952) is a German journalist and the former vice president of Mercedes-Benz motorsport activity, including Formula One, Formula 3 and DTM. Under his direction, Mercedes-Benz enjoyed considerable success in all categories, winning multiple races and championships.

== Journalist ==
Haug worked for the Pforzheimer Zeitung newspaper in his home town of Pforzheim as a volunteer, before joining them as a trainee journalist. He then moved on to the publishing house Motor-Presse-Verlag in Stuttgart, which was part of the Gruner + Jahr group, where he became head of motorsports for Auto, Motor und Sport magazine before becoming its deputy chief editor in 1988.

While busy pursuing a career in journalism, Haug also raced cars, including the 24 Hours Nürburgring where he finished second in 1985. He also took part, like many people involved with Formula One, in the Porsche Carrera Cup. In 1986, was given the opportunity to privately test a Williams F1 car.

== Motorsports ==
=== Mercedes-Benz ===
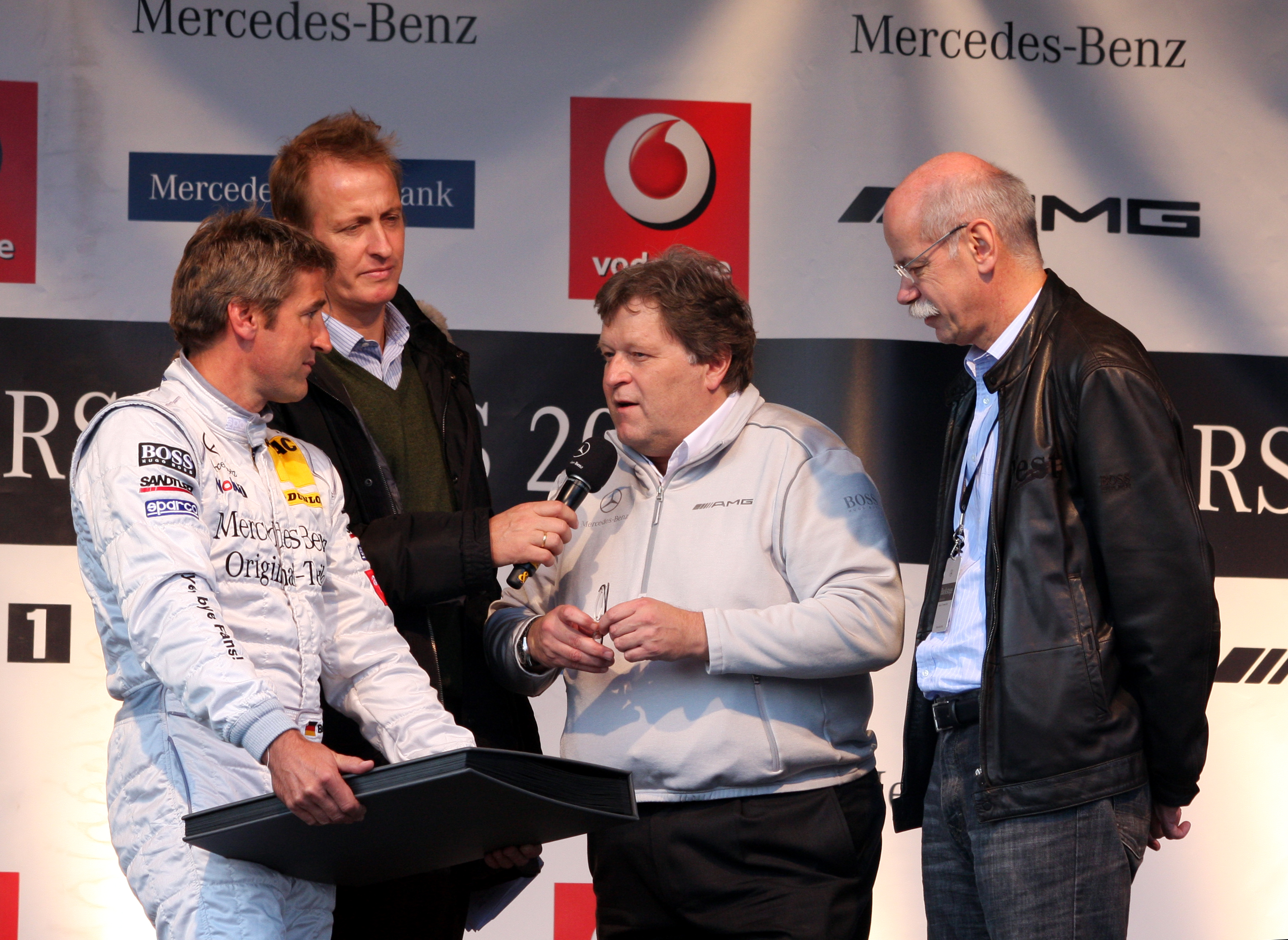
Haug together with Bernd Schneider (left) and Dieter Zetsche (right) in 2008

Haug joined Mercedes-Benz in 1990, with a brief to revive their motor sport credentials.

==== Sports car racing, Deutsche Tourenwagen Meisterschaft/International Touring Car Championship and Deutsche Tourenwagen Masters ====
Haug maintained Mercedes presence in Group C and later in the DTM and International Touring Car Championship. Early successes included Klaus Ludwig winning the DTM drivers title in 1992 and 1994, and Bernd Schneider winning both the DTM and ITC drivers titles in 1995. In 2000 Haug and Mercedes were instrumental in the relaunch of Deutsche Tourenwagen Masters.

==== Formula One ====
Under Haug's direction, Mercedes-Benz re-entered Formula One after almost 40 years. In 1993 Haug negotiated a partnership with Peter Sauber, with engineering assistance which resulted in Sauber team cars having the words Concept by Mercedes-Benz on their engine bay flanks. In 1994 Haug negotiated Mercedes-Benz entry to the CART championship, and the Sauber-Mercedes cars were now officially powered by Mercedes-Benz badged engines, developed by the company's development arrangement with United Kingdom based manufacturer Ilmor.

After the serious accident at the Monaco Grand Prix which resulted in injury to Karl Wendlinger, and with Team McLaren looking for a new engine supplier, Haug negotiated Mercedes-Benz partnership with McLaren from the 1995 season. In 2009, it was officially announced that Daimler AG in partnership with Aabar Investments had purchased a 75.1% stake in Brawn GP (Daimler AG: 45.1%; Aabar: 30%). Under Haug's leadership, the team was rebranded as Mercedes GP for 2010. The team used the Brawn GP base in Brackley for its operations and Brawn stayed on as team principal until the end of the 2013 season. On 13 December 2012, it was announced that Haug would leave his role and the company at the end of 2012.

=== Dodge ===
==== NASCAR ====
Apart from Mercedes-Benz motorsport Vice Presidency role, Norbert Haug was also played the key role of brought back Dodge brand to NASCAR Winston Cup Series in 2001 with an Intrepid model and also the development of Dodge R5P7 V8 engine. In the same year Haug recommended Dodge to partner with Bill Davis Racing, Chip Ganassi Racing with Felix Sabates, Evernham Motorsports, Petty Enterprises and Melling Racing teams and later expanding to Penske Racing team in 2003.

== Personal life ==
Haug is married, with one daughter.
