= Arrows A20 =

Formula One Car

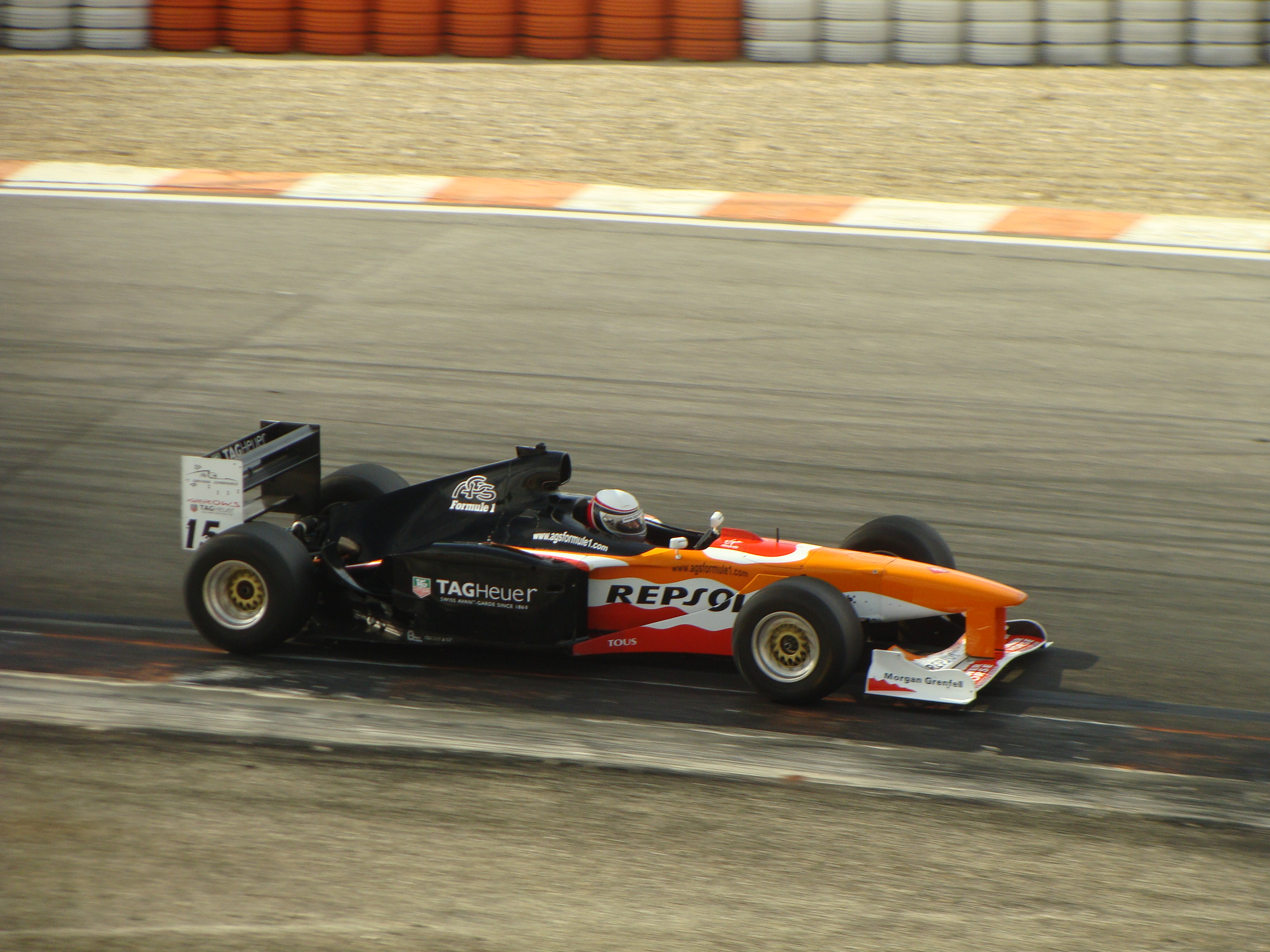
- The A20
- Category: Formula One
- Constructor: Arrows
- Designers: Mike Coughlan (Technical Director); Eghbal Hamidy (Chief Designer); Jean-Paul Gousset (Design Office Coordinator); Gary Savage (Head of R&D); Simon Jennings (Head of Aerodynamics); Brian Hart (Engine Director - Hart)
- Predecessor: A19
- Successor: A21

Technical specifications
- Chassis: Moulded carbon-fibre composite structure
- Suspension (front): Double wishbones, pushrod
- Suspension (rear): Double wishbones, pushrod
- Engine: Arrows A20E (Hart 1030) 72-degree 3.0 L V10
- Transmission: Arrows carbon-fibre six-speed longitudinal sequential semi-automatic
- Power: 715 hp @ 15,000 rpm
- Fuel: Elf (Note: Repsol YPF branding appeared on the A20, but the car used Elf fuel and lubricants.)
- Tyres: Bridgestone

Competition history
- Notable entrants: Repsol Arrows F1 Team
- Notable drivers: 14. (Spain) Pedro de la Rosa; 15. (Japan) Toranosuke Takagi
- Debut: 1999 Australian Grand Prix
- Last event: 1999 Japanese Grand Prix
Races	Wins	Poles	F/Laps
16	0	0	0
- Constructors' Championships: 0
- Drivers' Championships: 0

The Arrows A20 was the car with which the Arrows Formula One team competed in the 1999 Formula One World Championship.

It was driven by former Jordan test driver Pedro de la Rosa, a Spanish débutant who brought considerable sponsorship from Repsol, and Japan's Toranosuke Takagi, who moved from the defunct Tyrrell team. Mika Salo was due to stay with the team after a promising 1998 but was dropped just a week before the opening race.

== Background and design ==
The team was short of funds with the lack of a major sponsor (Danka's sponsorship having ended at the end of 1998) and the chassis was a mild update of the A19, which had not been too competitive itself. John Barnard had departed and it was left to Mike Coughlan to develop the car.

After failing to find an alternative supplier, engine builder Brian Hart again supplied in-house engines, but as in 1998, it became clear that his small resources were insufficient to compete in modern F1, and he left the team after an ownership dispute with Tom Walkinshaw.

=== Malik Ado Ibrahim buyout ===
At the start of the year a colourful Nigerian prince, Malik Ado-Ibrahim, bought a 25% shareholding in the team, and his T-Minus brand appeared on the cars for most of the year. However, he too could not provide sufficient funding. The idea behind the T-Minus brand was that companies and corporations would purchase the rights to use the name and they would be permitted to use the brand to promote their products. Malik stated that he planned to use the brand in conjunction with Lamborghini but a deal never pulled through. An Arrows employee of the time stated 'The T-Minus brand has brought in absolutely no money over the year' and carried on stating 'It was simply a dream in the Prince's head and nothing materialised.' Investment company Morgan Grenfell also bought into Arrows, taking a 50% controlling interest in the team.

== Racing history ==
The year proved to be a disaster, as the cars were slow and unreliable, and the team ended up battling with Minardi at the back of the grid, and arguably got even slower throughout the season to the point that they were being frequently outqualified by their minnow rivals. Its only competitive showing came in the opening race of the season at Melbourne, where de la Rosa finished sixth for a point on his début, with Takagi one place back in seventh. Only this point, and newcomer BAR's poor finishing record, kept Arrows from finishing last in the Constructors' standings. De La Rosa stated that the engine, not the chassis was the problem, commenting favorably on the handling of the car.

While de la Rosa proved promising, Takagi struggled with communication issues as he could not speak English at the time and left at the end of the season; he was replaced for 2000 by Jos Verstappen.

== Aftermath ==
The A20 was extensively refitted in preparation for the 2000 season which saw the team use Supertec engines. De La Rosa and Tom Coronel put in a lot of mileage and posted competitive times. Mark Webber had his first test in a Formula One car aboard an A20 in November 1999, running the Supertec engine and new gearbox. He later said in his autobiography that the A20 was an above average car.

The A20 eventually formed the basis of the AX3 3-seater car which Arrows introduced in 2001, using a modified chassis and the same Hart engine. Two examples were built.

== Complete Formula One results ==
(key) (results in bold indicate pole position)

Year	Entrant	Engine	Tyres	Drivers	1	2	3	4	5	6	7	8	9	10	11	12	13	14	15	16	Points	WCC
1999	Repsol Arrows F1 Team	Arrows V10	**B**		AUS	BRA	SMR	MON	ESP	CAN	FRA	GBR	AUT	GER	HUN	BEL	ITA	EUR	MAL	JPN	**1**	**9th**
1999	Repsol Arrows F1 Team	Arrows V10	**B**	Pedro de la Rosa	6	Ret	Ret	Ret	11	Ret	12	Ret	Ret	Ret	15	Ret	Ret	Ret	Ret	13	**1**	**9th**
1999	Repsol Arrows F1 Team	Arrows V10	**B**	Toranosuke Takagi	7	8	Ret	Ret	12	Ret	DSQ	16	Ret	Ret	Ret	Ret	Ret	Ret	Ret	Ret	**1**	**9th**
