= Arrows A19 =

Formula One Car

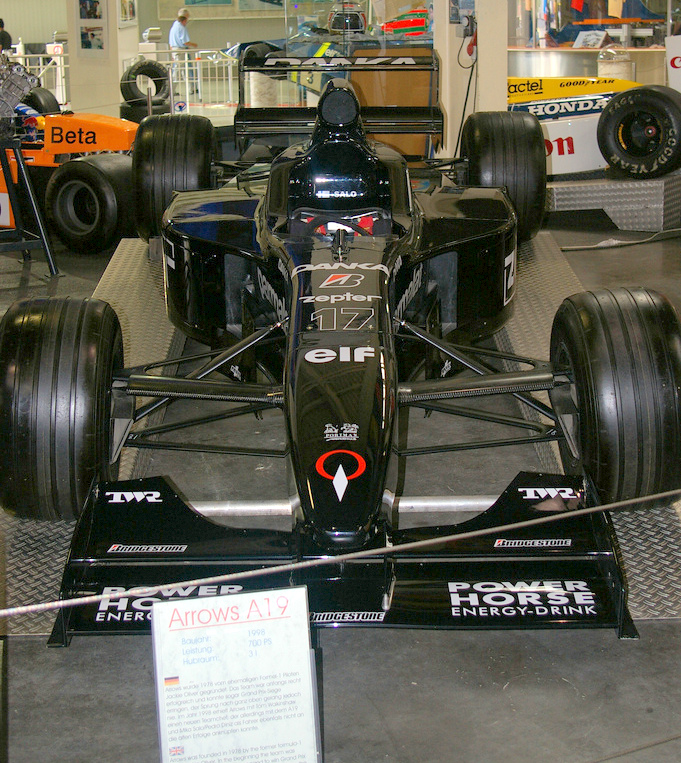
- The A19 of Mika Salo
- Category: Formula One
- Constructor: Arrows
- Designers: John Barnard (Technical Director); Mike Coughlan (Engineering Director); Paul Bowen (Chief Designer); Jean-Paul Gousset (Design Office Coordinator); Gary Savage (Head of R&D); Simon Jennings (Head of Aerodynamics); Brian Hart (Engine Director - Hart)
- Predecessor: A18
- Successor: A20

Technical specifications
- Chassis: carbon-fibre and honeycomb composite structure
- Suspension (front): double wishbones, pushrod
- Suspension (rear): double wishbones, pushrod
- Engine: Arrows T2-F1 (Hart 1030) 72-degree V10
- Transmission: Arrows six-speed longitudinal sequential semi-automatic
- Power: 700 (522 kW) hp @ 15,000 rpm
- Fuel: Elf
- Tyres: Bridgestone

Competition history
- Notable entrants: Danka Zepter Arrows
- Notable drivers: 16. (Brazil) Pedro Diniz; 17. (Finland) Mika Salo
- Debut: 1998 Australian Grand Prix
- Last event: 1998 Japanese Grand Prix
Races	Wins	Poles	F/Laps
16	0	0	0
- Constructors' Championships: 0
- Drivers' Championships: 0

The Arrows A19 was the car with which the Arrows Formula One team competed in the 1998 Formula One World Championship. It was driven by Brazilian Pedro Diniz, who was in his second season with the team, and Finn Mika Salo, who had moved from Tyrrell to replace Jordan-bound Damon Hill.

== Development ==
Tom Walkinshaw had persuaded John Barnard to join the team as technical director the previous year, and he set to work on the next car. 1998 was a year of unfulfilled promise from Arrows. The cars looked highly distinctive with an almost completely black livery. The car's main weakness was its engine. Tom Walkinshaw, the Team Principal of Arrows, had bought into Brian Hart's engine company and thus Arrows became the first British F1 team to produce their own engines since BRM in 1977. Walkinshaw explained the move as a chance to push the team's engineering further forward and to cut costs on paying for customer engines. However, Hart's budget was not enough to compete with the major car manufacturers who supplied most of the other teams, and the problems were exacerbated by the car not being completed on time. Barnard had designed a carbon fibre gearbox for the A19, but it proved troublesome throughout the year, affecting results. Barnard was also moonlighting, designing parts for Prost, which did not endear him to Walkinshaw. By the end of the season, Barnard had left the team, replaced by Mike Coughlan.

== Race history ==
The A19 proved to be quite unreliable throughout the season, particularly in the first few Grands Prix, culminating in an embarrassing simultaneous engine failure at the 1998 Spanish Grand Prix. However, the next race at Monaco proved the effectiveness of the chassis: on a circuit where engine power is not so vital, the cars were competitive and scored a double-points finish. Thereafter, the cars were too slow and unreliable to be serious contenders, although Diniz salvaged fifth place at the chaotic 1998 Belgian Grand Prix. During the same weekend, Salo destroyed his car during the Saturday practice session at Eau Rouge and wrote off another chassis in the multi-car pile-up at the start of the race.

The poor performance of the Hart engine caused Tom Walkinshaw to look for an alternative. Discussions for a deal with Toyota came to nothing and with Barnard leaving in December and an attempted sale to Zakspeed falling through, Arrows were forced to soldier on in 1999.

The team eventually finished a respectable seventh in the Constructors' Championship, with six points.

== Sponsorship and livery ==
The A18 sported an all black livery. Lack of funds resulted in both Danka and Zepter sponsorships being terminated from the team.

== Complete Formula One results ==
(key) (results in bold indicate pole position)

Year	Entrant	Engine	Tyres	Drivers	1	2	3	4	5	6	7	8	9	10	11	12	13	14	15	16	Points	WCC
1998	Danka Zepter Arrows	Arrows V10	**B**		AUS	BRA	ARG	SMR	ESP	MON	CAN	FRA	GBR	AUT	GER	HUN	BEL	ITA	LUX	JPN	**6**	**7th**
1998	Danka Zepter Arrows	Arrows V10	**B**	Pedro Diniz	Ret	Ret	Ret	Ret	Ret	6	9	14	Ret	Ret	Ret	11	5	Ret	Ret	Ret	**6**	**7th**
1998	Danka Zepter Arrows	Arrows V10	**B**	Mika Salo	Ret	Ret	Ret	9	Ret	4	Ret	13	Ret	Ret	14	Ret	DNS	Ret	14	Ret	**6**	**7th**
