= Arrows A21 =

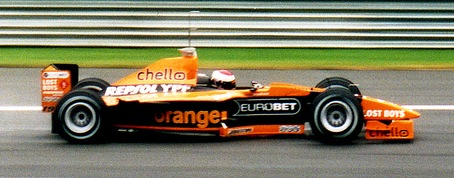
- Jos Verstappen driving the A21 during the 2000 Italian Grand Prix
- Category: Formula One
- Constructor: Arrows
- Designers: Mike Coughlan (Technical Director); Eghbal Hamidy (Chief Designer); John Davis (Head of R&D); Simon Jennings (Head of Aerodynamics)
- Predecessor: A20
- Successor: A22

Technical specifications
- Chassis: Moulded carbon fibre composite structure
- Suspension (front): Double wishbones, in-board spring dampers, pullrod
- Suspension (rear): Double wishbones, in-board spring dampers, pushrod
- Engine: Supertec FB02 (Renault) 71-degree V10
- Transmission: Arrows/Xtrac carbon-fibre six-speed longitudinal sequential semi-automatic
- Power: 780 hp @ 15,800 rpm
- Fuel: Elf (Note: Repsol YPF branding appeared on the A21, but the car used Elf fuel and lubricants.)
- Tyres: Bridgestone

Competition history
- Notable entrants: Arrows F1 Team
- Notable drivers: 18. (Spain) Pedro de la Rosa; 19. (Netherlands) Jos Verstappen
- Debut: 2000 Australian Grand Prix
- Last event: 2000 Malaysian Grand Prix
Races	Wins	Poles	F/Laps
17	0	0	0
- Constructors' Championships: 0
- Drivers' Championships: 0

The Arrows A21 was the car with which the Arrows Formula One team competed in the 2000 Formula One World Championship. It was driven by Spaniard Pedro de la Rosa, in his second year with the team, and experienced Dutchman Jos Verstappen, who had driven for the team in its Footwork guise in 1996.

== Overview ==
=== Design and development ===
The A21 was a completely new design by Coughlan and Eghbal Hamidy, who had designed the very similar looking Stewart SF3. The A21 benefitted from the revised Supertec engine and an excellent aerodynamic package with a much lower centre of gravity over its predecessor. Work on the car started early as the team switched its focus from the aged A20 car. A major injection of sponsorship from cell phone company Orange helped fund further development throughout the season. Paul Stoddart's European Aviation also became sponsors, providing logistical and transportation support in addition to Stoddart's F3000 squad effectively becoming Arrows' junior team.

=== Racing history ===
The car proved to be very promising after the catastrophic 1999 season, but was too unreliable to score more than a handful of points-scoring finishes. Breaking the lap record in pre-season testing at Barcelona confirmed the car's potential. De la Rosa looked set for podium finishes at Hockenheim and the A1-Ring, but lost time after a spin in the former and suffered a gearbox failure in the latter. Verstappen also produced a number of impressive performances, including a memorable drive through the field in changeable weather conditions in Canada. His season culminated in fourth place at Monza. The A21 was also noted for consistently having amongst the highest straight-line speed of any car in the 2000 season. Both Verstappen and De La Rosa enjoyed driving the car, and both enthused about how fast it was, while Verstappen conceded that it was not at its best on high downforce tracks.

Verstappen and De la Rosa enjoyed a good working relationship and the Dutchman was keen to remain with the team going forward.

During the season, the team was the focus of a television documentary show, Racing Arrows. The series featured 13 episodes which followed the progress of the team and drivers throughout the season and was broadcast by British channel ITV in 2001.

The team eventually finished seventh in the Constructors' Championship, with seven points.

== Arrows AX-3 ==
In 2001, Arrows took one of the A21s and modified it into a 3-seater and retaining the original V10 engine. The project was designated as the Arrows AX-3 and used for the demonstration most recently in the Adelaide Motorsport Festival.

== Complete Formula One results ==
(key) (results in bold indicate pole position)

Year	Entrant	Engine	Tyres	Drivers	1	2	3	4	5	6	7	8	9	10	11	12	13	14	15	16	17	Points	WCC
2000	Arrows F1 Team	Supertec V10	**B**		AUS	BRA	SMR	GBR	ESP	EUR	MON	CAN	FRA	AUT	GER	HUN	BEL	ITA	USA	JPN	MAL	**7**	**7th**
2000	Arrows F1 Team	Supertec V10	**B**	(Spain) Pedro de la Rosa	Ret	8	Ret	Ret	Ret	6	DNS	Ret	Ret	Ret	6	16	16	Ret	Ret	12	Ret	**7**	**7th**
2000	Arrows F1 Team	Supertec V10	**B**	(Netherlands) Jos Verstappen	Ret	7	14	Ret	Ret	Ret	Ret	5	Ret	Ret	Ret	13	15	4	Ret	Ret	10	**7**	**7th**
