= Pedro de la Rosa =

Spanish racing driver (born 1971)

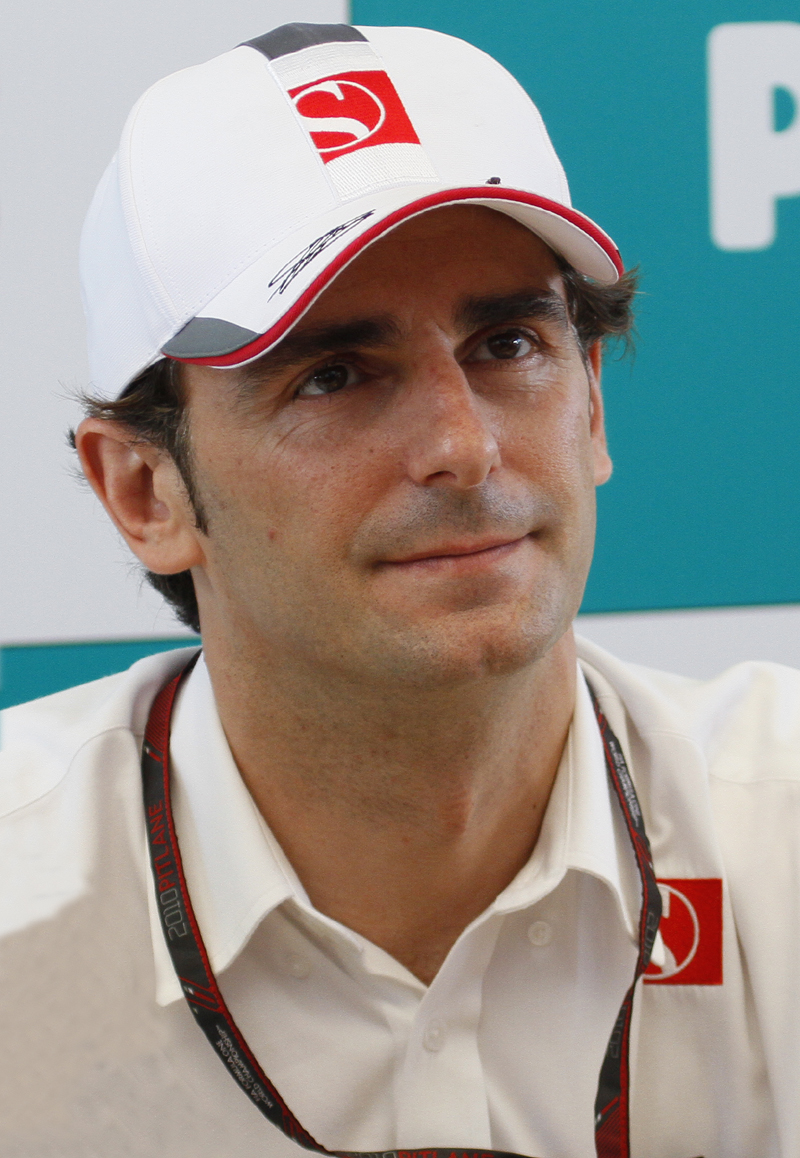
- De la Rosa at the 2010 Malaysian Grand Prix
- Born: Pedro Martínez de la Rosa; 24 February 1971 (age 55); Barcelona, Catalonia, Spain
- Spouse: Maria Reyes Ventós (m. 2003)
- Children: 3
- Relatives: Bruno del Pino (nephew)

Formula One World Championship career
- Nationality: (Spain) Spanish
- Active years: 1999–2002, 2005–2006, 2010–2012
- Team(s): Arrows, Jaguar, McLaren, Sauber, HRT
- Entries: 107 (104 starts)
- Championships: 0
- Wins: 0
- Podiums: 1
- Career points: 35
- Pole positions: 0
- Fastest laps: 1
- First entry: 1999 Australian Grand Prix
- Last entry: 2012 Brazilian Grand Prix

Formula Nippon career
- Years active: 1996–1997
- Teams: Nova
- Starts: 20
- Championships: 1 (1997)
- Wins: 6
- Podiums: 11
- Poles: 5
- Fastest laps: 3

JGTC career
- Years active: 1996–1997
- Teams: TOM'S
- Starts: 12
- Championships: 1 (1997)
- Wins: 2
- Podiums: 6
- Poles: 2
- Fastest laps: 2
- Best finish: 1st in 1997 (GT500)

Pedro Martínez de la Rosa (Spanish pronunciation: [ˈpeðɾo ðe la ˈrosa]; born 24 February 1971) is a Spanish former racing driver, motorsport executive and broadcaster, who competed in Formula One between 1999 and 2012. (Note: The exact years De la Rosa competed in Formula One: 1999–2002, 2005–2006, 2010–2012.) In Japanese motorsport, De la Rosa won the Formula Nippon Championship and the All-Japan GT Championship, both in 1997.

Born and raised in Barcelona, De la Rosa began his career in radio-controlled racing, winning several national and continental titles before moving into karting aged 17. He participated in 107 Grands Prix for the Arrows, Jaguar, McLaren, Sauber and HRT teams. He made his Formula One debut at the 1999 Australian Grand Prix, scoring a point in his first race. He scored a total of 35 championship points, which includes a podium finish at the 2006 Hungarian Grand Prix. He is the first Spanish racing driver to win a National Championship in Japanese open-wheel racing history, won the Japanese Super Formula Championship (formerly Formula Nippon Championship) and the Super GT (formerly JGTC) in 1997.

Upon retiring from motor racing, De la Rosa became a commentator and pundit for La Sexta, Telecinco, Movistar and DAZN. He founded Drivex in 2005, and served as technical and sporting director of Techeetah in Formula E during the 2018–19 season, winning the Formula E Teams' Championship. He has also been an ambassador for Aston Martin since 2022.

== Early career ==
De la Rosa was born in Barcelona, Catalonia, Spain, and unlike most drivers, he started his career in radio-controlled cars, specialising in 1:8 off-road. He won three consecutive domestic championship titles between 1983 and 1985, he became the first multiple European radio controlled off-road championship twice in 1983 and 1984 and was runner up in the inaugural world championship in 1986. It was only after that that he started karting in a local Spanish championship in 1988 when he was 17. He then joined the Spanish Formula Fiat Uno and became champion in 1989.

== Professional career ==
In 1990, De la Rosa raced in Spanish Formula Ford 1600 and became champion. He later drove in British Formula Ford 1600 and got two podiums out of six races. In 1991, de la Rosa achieved fourth place in the Spanish Formula Renault Championship with three podium finishes. In 1992, he was both European and British Formula Renault champion. He slipped down the order in the next two years. In 1995, he was champion of the Japanese Formula Three series and third in the Macau Grand Prix. In 1996, he finished eighth in both the Formula Nippon and All Japan GT Championship. The next year, he was the champion in Formula Nippon. He was also the All Japan GT Champion with Michael Krumm. In 2005 he also won the Race of Stars.

== Formula One (1999–2014) ==
=== Arrows (1999–2000) ===
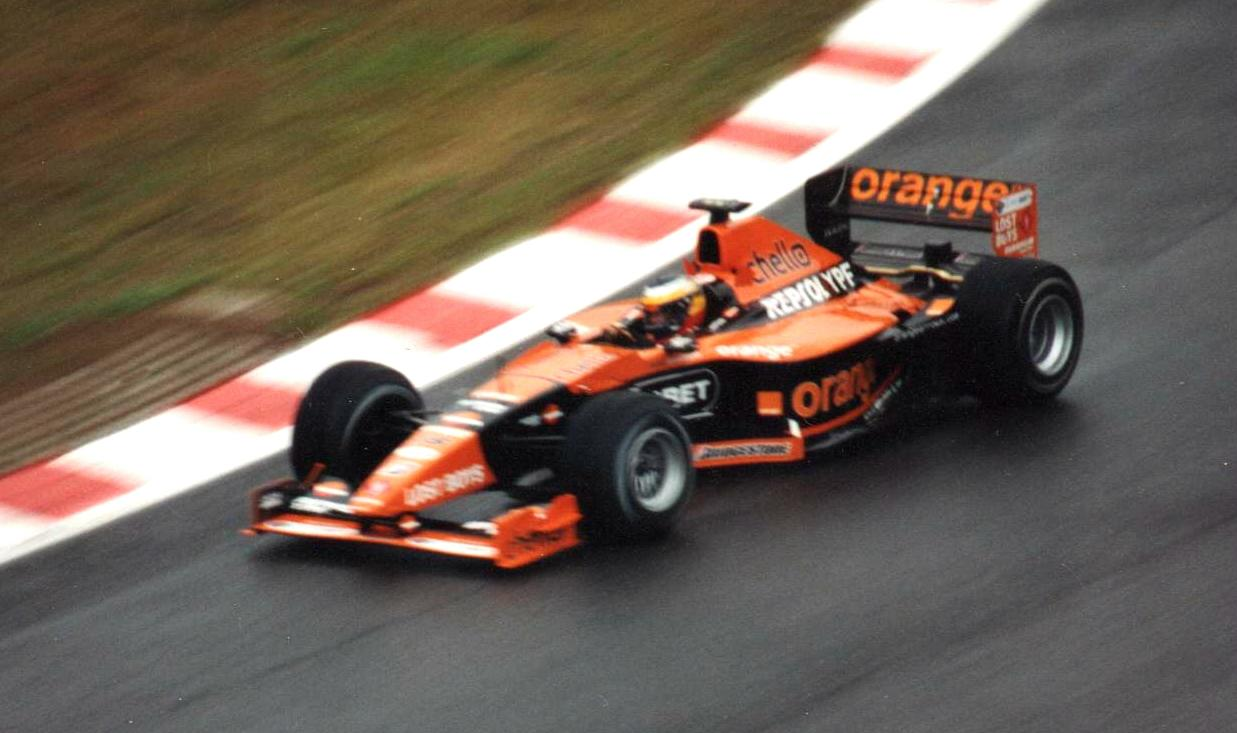
De la Rosa driving for Arrows at the 2000 Belgian Grand Prix

In 1998, De la Rosa was a test driver for Jordan. The next year, he joined Arrows and scored one world championship point by finishing sixth in his debut race, the Australian Grand Prix. He regularly outpaced his more experienced teammate Toranosuke Takagi. In 2000, he remained at Arrows alongside Dutchman Jos Verstappen. He scored two points, finishing sixth in the German Grand Prix and the European Grand Prix. Verstappen commented mid-season that he and De la Rosa 'work well together and we have a good partnership'. During the 2000 season, the Arrows team took part in a 13-part TV series named 'Racing Arrows' which followed the team and drivers throughout the year. It was shown on the British TV channel ITV in 2001.

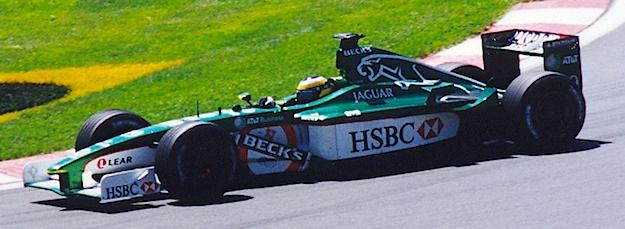
De la Rosa driving for Jaguar at the 2001 Canadian Grand Prix

=== Jaguar (2001–2002) ===
De la Rosa raced for two years with Jaguar Racing alongside Eddie Irvine, scoring three points in 2001 and none in 2002. At the end of the 2002 season, Jaguar paid off his contract which was set to expire at the conclusion of 2003, replacing him with Antônio Pizzonia.

=== McLaren (2003–2009) ===
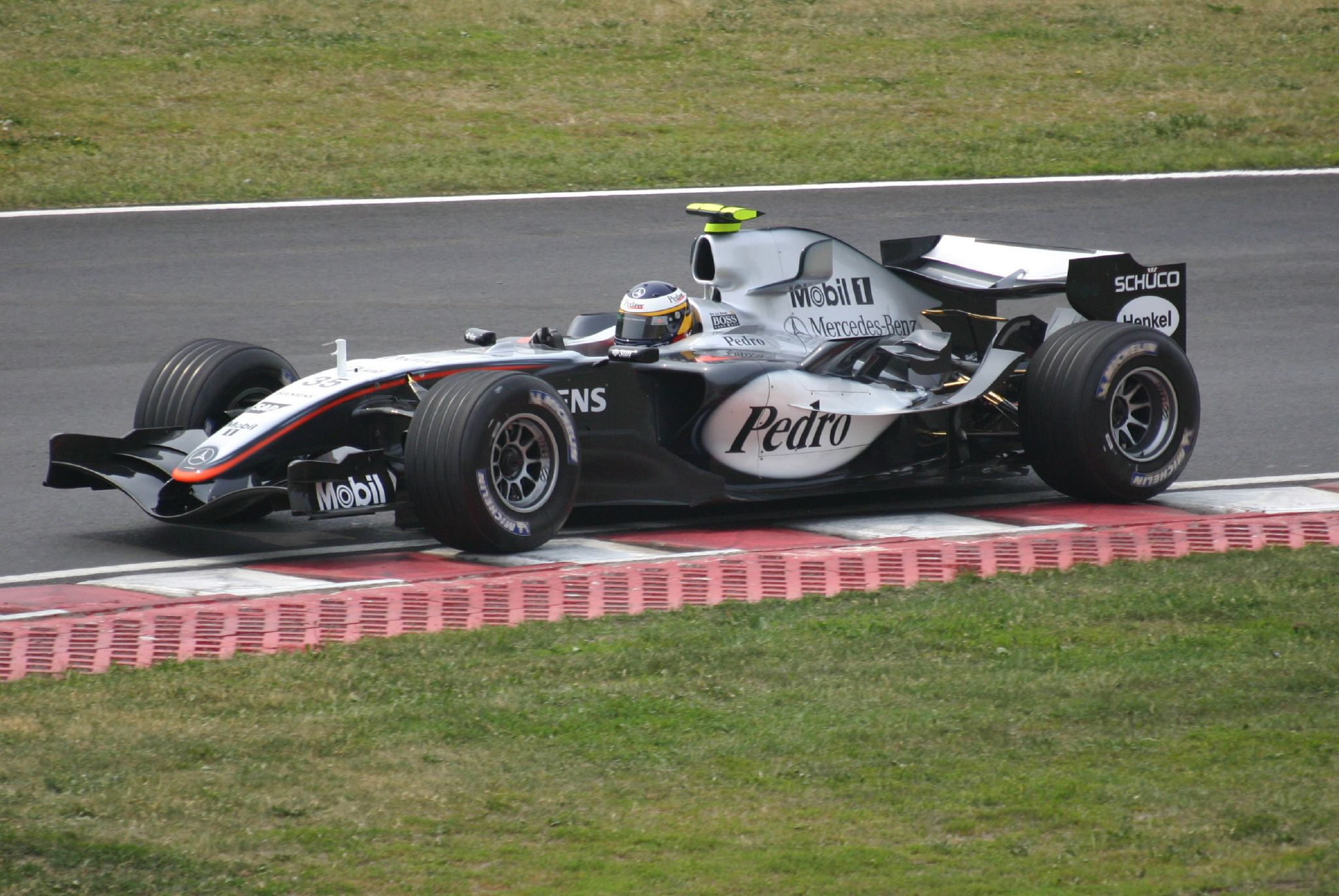
De la Rosa at the 2005 Canadian Grand Prix, as a third driver

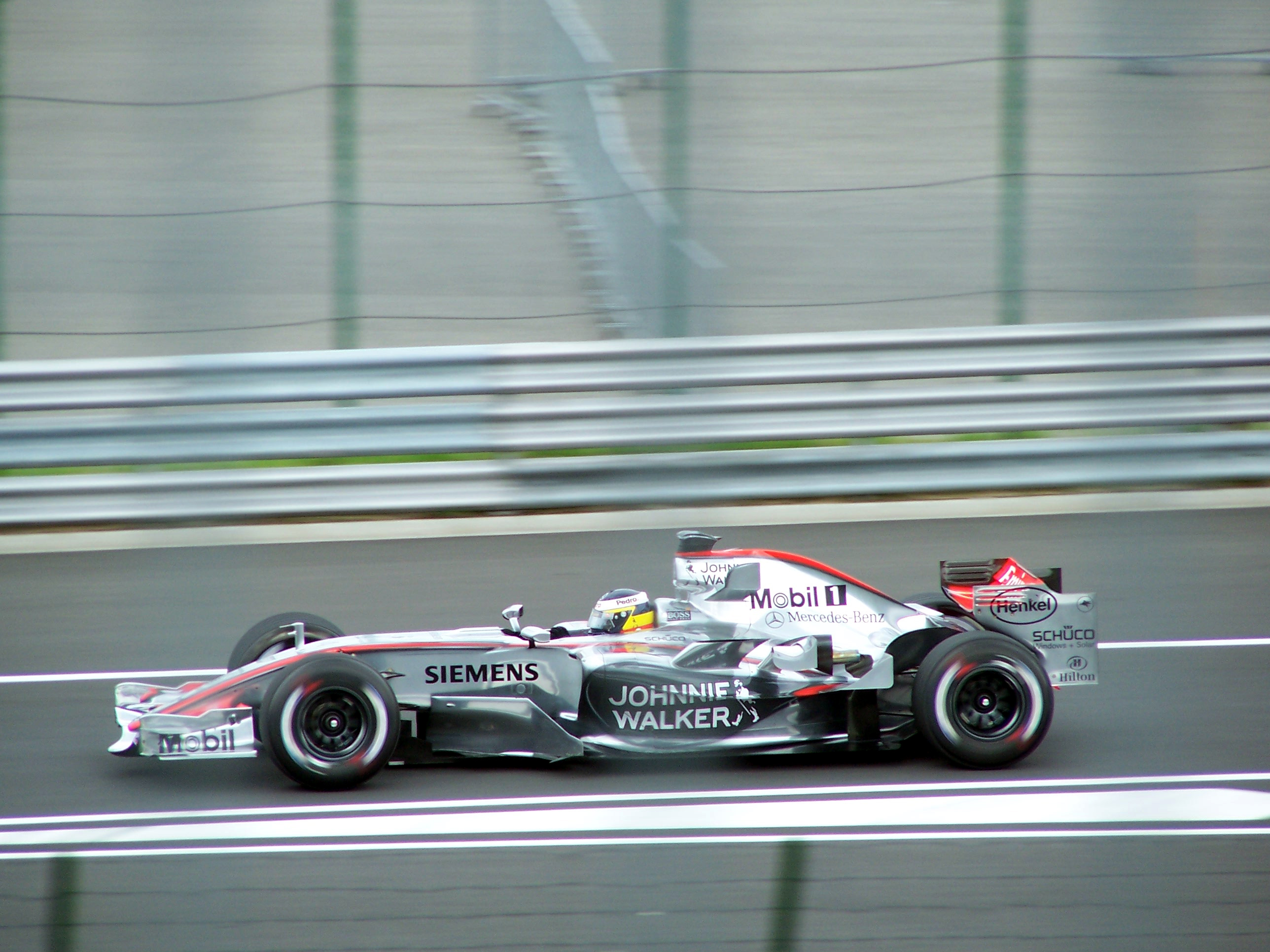
De la Rosa at the 2006 Hungarian Grand Prix

De la Rosa became a test driver for McLaren but raced at the 2005 Bahrain Grand Prix when Juan Pablo Montoya injured his shoulder. He finished fifth and set a lap record which he still holds as of 2025.

On 11 July 2006, it was announced that De la Rosa would take over the second McLaren race seat with immediate effect following Juan Pablo Montoya's departure to NASCAR. It was initially unclear whether he would remain in the seat until the end of the season, but some successful results led to him being retained.

At the 2006 Hungarian Grand Prix, De la Rosa scored his first and only Formula One podium, finishing in second place behind Jenson Button.

After a long period of speculation as to who would be Fernando Alonso's teammate in 2007, Lewis Hamilton secured the seat. De la Rosa would carry on as the team's test driver.

For the 2005 season, De la Rosa combined his testing duties with providing race commentary for Spanish broadcaster Telecinco. After his absence in 2006, he returned to the microphone in 2007.

Reports in 2007 consistently linked De la Rosa to a return to F1 racing with the new Prodrive team, which was set to make its debut in the 2008 season. Speculation suggested that Prodrive would run with support from the McLaren team, and that De la Rosa, along with fellow tester Gary Paffett, would race for them in their maiden season. However, the team failed to make the grid for the new season, and De la Rosa instead remained as a test driver for McLaren.

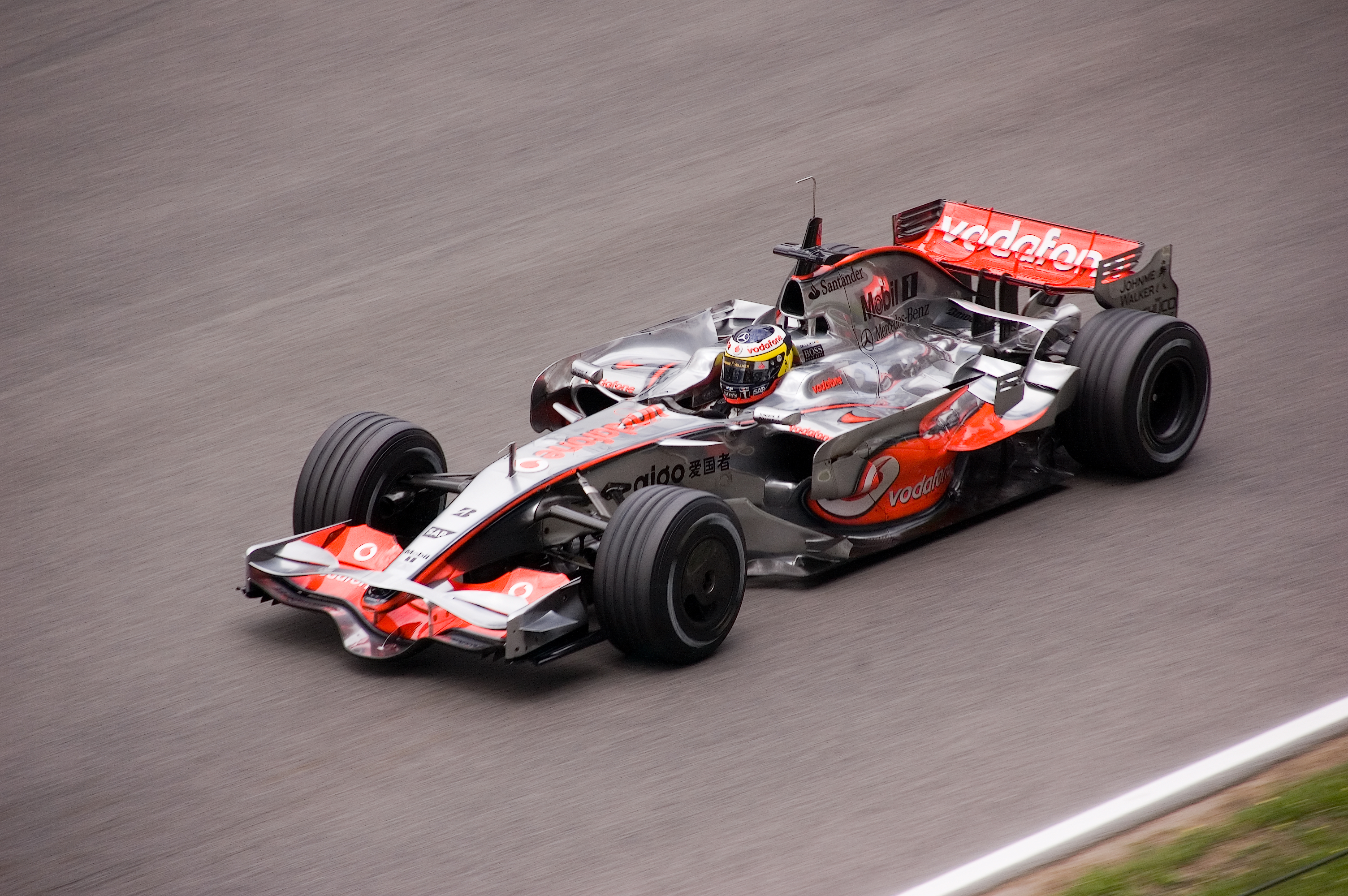
De la Rosa testing for McLaren at the Circuit de Catalunya in 2008

De la Rosa was also involved in the espionage controversy surrounding his team and rivals Ferrari. With evidence provided by him and teammate Fernando Alonso, the FIA excluded the team from the 2007 Constructors' Championship, and issued a record fine of $100 million. He was understood to have sent e-mails to Mike Coughlan and Fernando Alonso regarding the Ferrari cars' setup.

Before the Australian Grand Prix of 2008, De la Rosa was elected as the new chairman of the Grand Prix Drivers' Association after a unanimous vote. De la Rosa was the preferred candidate for GPDA directors Mark Webber and Fernando Alonso. He replaced the retired Ralf Schumacher in the role. He remained at McLaren in 2009, and as of January 2010 was the fifth most experienced test driver in history, in terms of test days. He stated that he wished to step down from the role of GPDA chairman, following the completion of his deal to drive for Sauber in 2010, and was duly replaced in the role by Nick Heidfeld at the Australian Grand Prix.

=== Sauber (2010–2011) ===
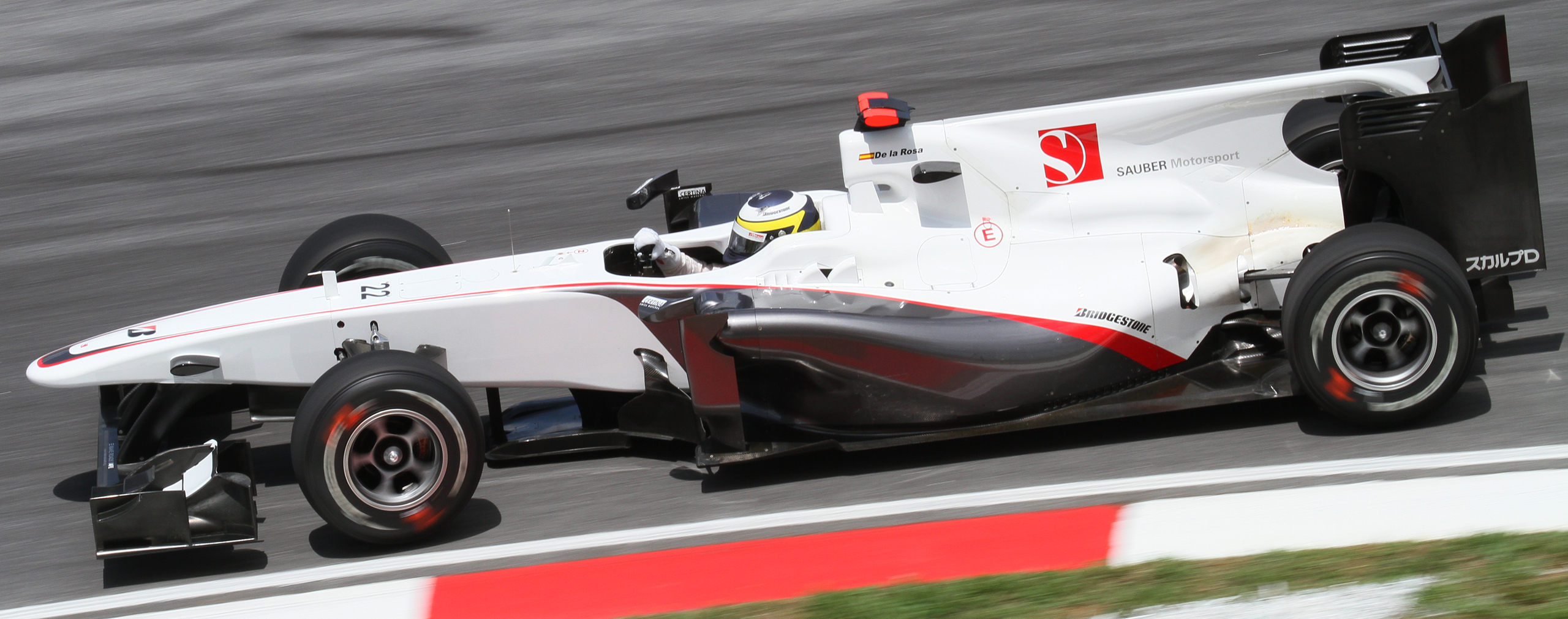
De la Rosa driving for Sauber at the 2010 Malaysian Grand Prix

In 2010, De la Rosa drove for the newly resurrected Sauber team. His teammate at Sauber was Japanese driver Kamui Kobayashi who impressed at Toyota during the last two races of the 2009 Formula One season.

De la Rosa finished seven of the thirteen races he started in the 2010 season, and picked up six points from a single points-scoring finish, a seventh-place finish at the Hungarian Grand Prix. These points would be the last of his Formula One career. De la Rosa qualified in the top-ten on two occasions, at Silverstone and in Hungary, as both he and teammate Kobayashi struggled with reliability problems for the majority of the season.

De la Rosa was dropped from his race seat by Sauber in favour of Nick Heidfeld after the Italian Grand Prix. De la Rosa replaced Heidfeld as test driver for Pirelli, in anticipation for their return to Formula One for the 2011 season.

After Sergio Pérez's accident in Monaco, De la Rosa replaced him for Sauber at the Canadian Grand Prix, after Pérez decided, after the first free practice session on Friday, to sit out the rest of the weekend. De la Rosa managed to stay out of trouble throughout the first part of the race, affected by heavy rain, running as high as ninth before a red flag suspended the race. He eventually finished 12th after having some contact soon after the restart, which required a new wing.

=== McLaren (2011) ===
On 9 March 2011, McLaren announced that De la Rosa had returned to the team as their test and reserve driver.

=== HRT (2012) ===
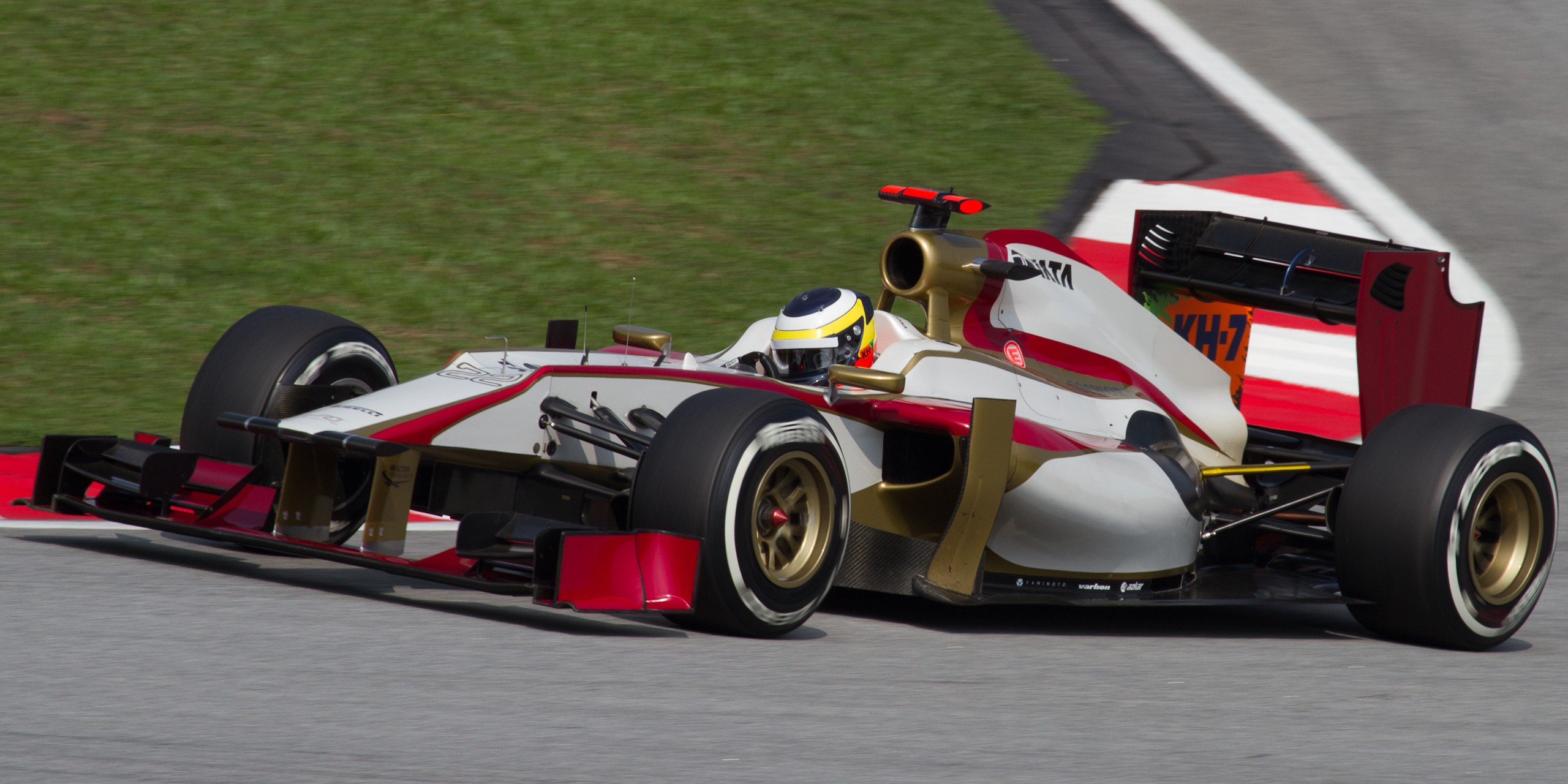
De la Rosa driving for HRT at the 2012 Malaysian Grand Prix.

On 21 November 2011, it was announced that De la Rosa had signed for HRT F1 on a two-year contract. His teammate was Indian driver Narain Karthikeyan. Both drivers failed to qualify for the first race of the season in Australia, as De la Rosa was only able to complete seven timed laps during the race weekend. At the next race weekend in Malaysia, he was able to qualify and finish 22nd in the race after receiving a drive through penalty after the race was restarted, and he was later promoted to 21st place due to Karthikeyan's 20-second penalty for an incident with Sebastian Vettel.

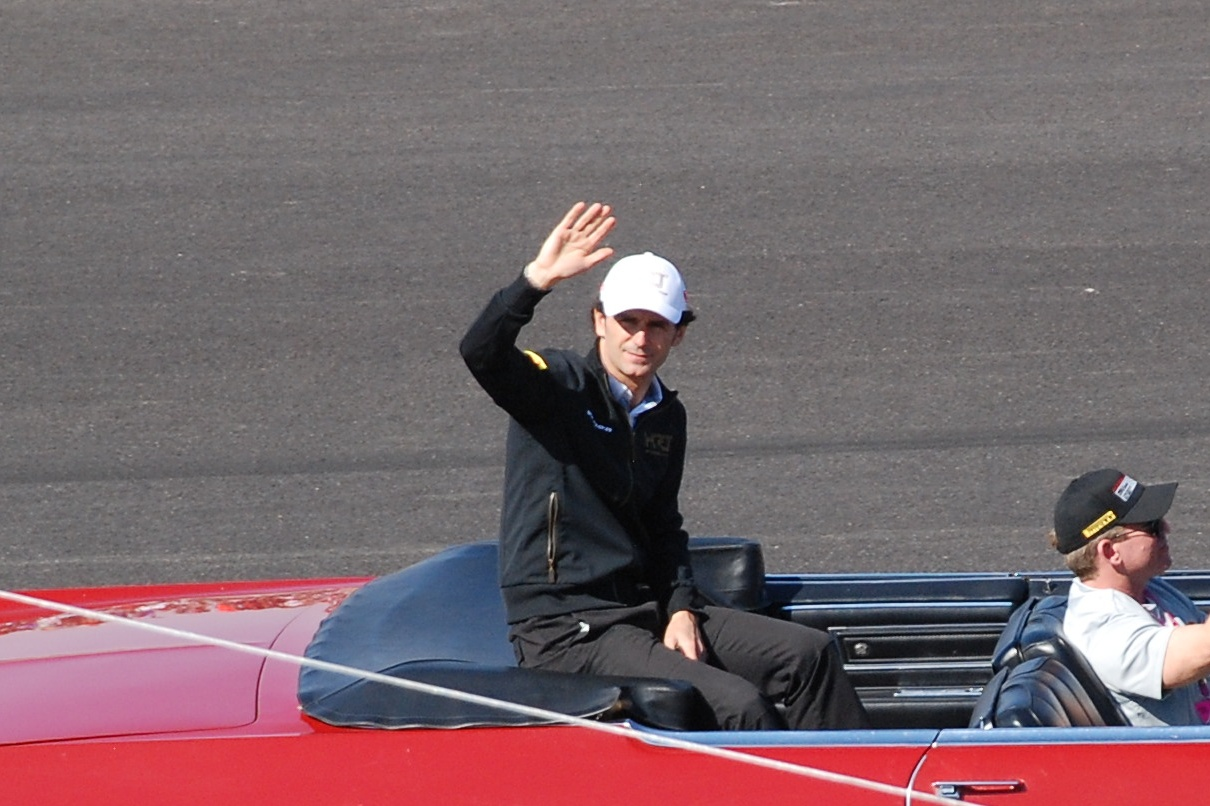
De la Rosa at the 2012 US Grand Prix

De la Rosa qualified ahead of Karthikeyan once again in China, and finished 21st, one lap down from the race winner. In Bahrain, he finished 20th after qualifying 22nd, although after the race he admitted that the team still needed "to gain some speed per lap" to fight their rivals consistently. Following on from this, De la Rosa finished his home race for the first time since 1999 in 19th place, the last of all classified drivers. However, he was unable to complete the Monaco Grand Prix due to a collision with Pastor Maldonado at the beginning of the race.

De la Rosa had a contract to compete in the 2013 season with HRT and was due to become team principal for 2014. The team folded at the end of the 2012 season, meaning de la Rosa was unable to take either position.

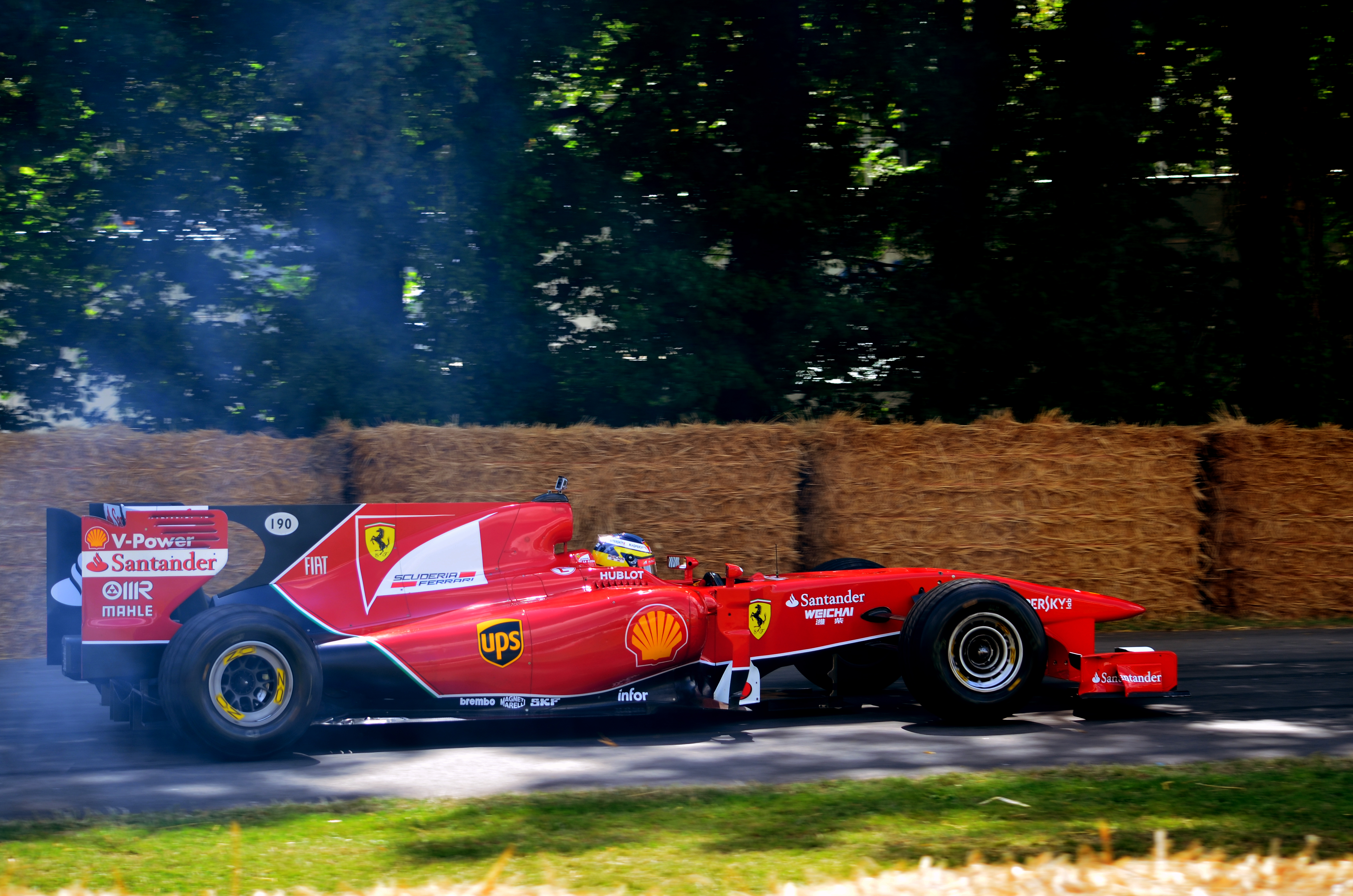
De la Rosa at the 2014 Goodwood Festival of Speed

=== Ferrari (2013–2014) ===
On 16 January, Ferrari announced that De la Rosa had been signed in a developmental role for the team, aiding with its simulator resources. On 24 January Ferrari announced that De la Rosa would share testing duties of their 2013 challenger, the F138, with Felipe Massa at the first test of the season, beginning on 5 February in Jerez.

== Other ventures ==
=== Team management ===
In 2005, De la Rosa founded feeder series outfit Drivex with Miguel Ángel de Castro. The team has been successful, with their biggest achievement being winning the 2019 F4 Spanish Championship teams' and drivers' title with current Alpine Formula One driver Franco Colapinto.

De la Rosa served as the technical and sporting director of Techeetah in Formula E during the 2018–19 season.

De la Rosa also runs a driving school and racing team called Drivex.

In October 2022, De la Rosa was appointed ambassador for Aston Martin Formula One Team.

=== Broadcasting ===
De la Rosa has also worked as a colour analyst for Formula One broadcasts on La Sexta, Telecinco, Movistar and currently DAZN.

== Personal life ==
De la Rosa has one daughter. His nephew Bruno del Pino is also a racing driver, who previously drove for his Drivex team.

== Racing record ==
=== Career summary ===
Season	Series	Team	Races	Wins	Poles	F/Laps	Podiums	Points	Position
1989	Spanish Formula Fiat	Ofensiva Uno – Meycom	7	2	?	?	5	?	**1st**
1990	Spanish Formula Ford	Racing for Spain	10	8	?	?	9	?	**1st**
1990	British Formula Ford 1600	Racing for Spain	6	0	?	?	2	0	NC
1990	Formula Ford Festival	?	1	0	0	0	0	N/A	12th
1991	Spanish Formula Renault Championship	Racing for Spain	10	0	?	?	3	46	4th
1992	Formula Renault UK	Racing for Spain	12	3	0	?	7	153	**1st**
1992	Rencontres Internationales de Formule Renault	Racing for Spain	3	2	?	?	?	?	**1st**
1993	British Formula 3 Championship	West Surrey Racing	14	0	0	0	0	18	6th
1993	Macau Grand Prix	West Surrey Racing	1	0	0	0	0	N/A	NC
1993	Masters of Formula 3	West Surrey Racing	1	0	0	0	0	N/A	9th
1994	British Formula 3 Championship	Racing for Spain	17	0	0	0	0	6	19th
1995	All-Japan Formula 3 Championship	TOM'S	9	8	8	4	9	54	**1st**
1995	Macau Grand Prix	TOM'S	1	0	0	0	1	N/A	**3rd**
1996	Formula Nippon	Team Nova	10	0	0	0	1	13	8th
1996	All-Japan GT Championship	TOM'S	6	0	0	0	2	38	13th
1996	Macau Grand Prix	Paul Stewart Racing	1	0	0	0	0	N/A	7th
1997	Formula Nippon	Team Nova	10	6	4	3	10	82	**1st**
1997	All-Japan GT Championship	TOM'S	6	2	2	3	4	64	**1st**
1998	Formula One	Benson & Hedges Jordan	Test driver						
1999	Formula One	Repsol Arrows Grand Prix International	16	0	0	0	0	1	18th
2000	Formula One	Arrows Grand Prix International	17	0	0	0	0	2	16th
2001	Formula One	Prost Acer	Test driver						
2001	Formula One	Jaguar Racing F1 Team	13	0	0	0	0	3	16th
2002	Formula One	Jaguar Racing F1 Team	17	0	0	0	0	0	21st
2003	Formula One	West McLaren Mercedes	Test driver						
2004	Formula One	West McLaren Mercedes	Test driver						
2005	Formula One	West McLaren Mercedes	Test driver						
2005	Formula One	West McLaren Mercedes	1	0	0	1	0	4	20th
2006	Formula One	Team McLaren Mercedes	Test driver						
2006	Formula One	Team McLaren Mercedes	8	0	0	0	1	19	11th
2007	Formula One	Vodafone McLaren Mercedes	Test driver						
2008	Formula One	Vodafone McLaren Mercedes	Test driver						
2009	Formula One	Vodafone McLaren Mercedes	Test driver						
2010	Formula One	BMW Sauber F1 Team	14	0	0	0	0	6	17th
2010	Formula One	Pirelli	Test driver						
2011	Formula One	Vodafone McLaren Mercedes	Test driver						
2011	Formula One	Sauber F1 Team	1	0	0	0	0	0	20th
2012	Formula One	HRT Formula 1 Team	20	0	0	0	0	0	25th
2013	Formula One	Scuderia Ferrari	Test driver						
2014	Formula One	Scuderia Ferrari	Test driver						
2015–16	Formula E	Team Aguri	Pre-season test driver						

=== Complete RC racing results ===
(Races in bold indicate top qualifier)

==== IFMAR World Championship results ====
Year	Result	Class	Venue	Entrant	Car	Motor
1986	**2**	1:8 IC Off-Road	Grenoble	Garbo España	Garbo Gepard 3	Picco

==== EFRA European Championship results ====
Year	Result	Class	Venue	Entrant	Car	Motor
1983	1	1:8 IC Off-Road	France		Yankee Enduro 84x4	Picco
1984	1	1:8 IC Off-Road	Sweden		Yankee Enduro 84x4	Picco

==== AECAR Campeonato de España results ====
Year	Result	Class	Venue	Entrant	Car	Motor
1985	1	1:8 IC Off-Road			Garbo	Picco
1984	1	1:8 IC Off-Road			Garbo	Picco
1983	1	1:8 IC Off-Road			Garbo	Picco

=== Complete British Formula 3 results ===
(key) (Races in bold indicate pole position) (Races in italics indicate fastest lap)

Year	Entrant	Engine	Class	1	2	3	4	5	6	7	8	9	10	11	12	13	14	15	16	17	18	DC	Pts
1993	West Surrey Racing	Mugen-Honda	A	SIL; 5	THR; 3	BRH; DNS	DON; 3	BRH; 4	SIL; 4	OUL; 5	DON; Ret	SIL; 7	DON; Ret	SNE; NC	PEM; 8	SIL; Ret	SIL; Ret	THR; 7				7th	18
1994	Racing for Spain	Renault	A	SIL; 16	DON; 11	BRH; 16	BRH; 9	SIL; 14	SIL; Ret	BRH; Ret	THR; 15	OUL; 16	DON; Ret	SIL; 11	SNE; 11	PEM; 16	PEM; 13	SIL; Ret	SIL; DNS	THR; 16	SIL; 8	19th	6

=== Complete Japanese Formula 3 results ===
(key) (Races in bold indicate pole position) (Races in italics indicate fastest lap)

Year	Team	Engine	1	2	3	4	5	6	7	8	9	10	DC	Pts
1995	TOM's	Toyota	**SUZ**; 1	FUJ; C	TSU; 2	**MIN**; 1	**SUZ**; 1	**TAI**; 1	**SUG**; 1	**FUJ**; 1	**SUZ**; 1	**SEN**; 1	1st	54

=== Complete Formula Nippon results ===
(key) (Races in bold indicate pole position; races in italics indicate fastest lap)

Year	Entrant	1	2	3	4	5	6	7	8	9	10	DC	Points
1996	Team Nova	SUZ; 5	MIN; 7	FUJ; 6	TOK; 6	SUZ; Ret	SUG; 11	FUJ; 6	MIN; Ret	SUZ; 5	FUJ; 2	8th	13
1997	Team Nova	SUZ; 1	MIN; 1	**FUJ**; 2	**SUZ**; 3	SUG; 1	**FUJ**; 1	MIN; 2	**MOT**; 1	FUJ; 2	**SUZ**; 1	**1st**	**82**

=== Complete JGTC results ===
(key) (Races in bold indicate pole position) (Races in italics indicate fastest lap)

Year	Team	Car	Class	1	2	3	4	5	6	7	DC	Pts
1996	Toyota Castrol Team	Toyota Supra	GT500	SUZ; 5	FUJ; 2	SEN; 3	FUJ; Ret	SUG; 9	MIN; Ret		8th	38
1997	Toyota Castrol Team	Toyota Supra	GT500	SUZ; 14	**FUJ**; 3	SEN; 1	**FUJ**; 2	MIN; 1	SUG; 15		**1st**	**67**
1998	NISMO	Nissan Skyline GT-R	GT500	SUZ	FUJ; C	SEN	FUJ	MOT	MIN	SUG	NC	0

=== Complete Formula One results ===
(key)

Year	Entrant	Chassis	Engine	1	2	3	4	5	6	7	8	9	10	11	12	13	14	15	16	17	18	19	20	WDC	Points
1999	Repsol Arrows	Arrows A20	Arrows T2-F1 3.0 V10	AUS; 6	BRA; Ret	SMR; Ret	MON; Ret	ESP; 11	CAN; Ret	FRA; 11	GBR; Ret	AUT; Ret	GER; Ret	HUN; 15	BEL; Ret	ITA; Ret	EUR; Ret	MAL; Ret	JPN; 13					18th	1
2000	Orange Arrows	Arrows A21	Supertec FB02 3.0 V10	AUS; Ret	BRA; 8	SMR; Ret	GBR; Ret	ESP; Ret	EUR; 6	MON; DNS	CAN; Ret	FRA; Ret	AUT; Ret	GER; 6	HUN; 16	BEL; 16	ITA; Ret	USA; Ret	JPN; 12	MAL; Ret				16th	2
2001	HSBC Jaguar Racing	Jaguar R2	Cosworth CR-3 3.0 V10	AUS	MAL	BRA	SMR	ESP; Ret	AUT; Ret	MON; Ret	CAN; 6	EUR; 8	FRA; 14	GBR; 12	GER; Ret	HUN; 11	BEL; Ret	ITA; 5	USA; 12	JPN; Ret				16th	3
2002	HSBC Jaguar Racing	Jaguar R3	Cosworth CR-3 3.0 V10	AUS; 8	MAL; 10	BRA; 8	SMR; Ret	ESP; Ret	AUT; Ret	MON; 10	CAN; Ret	EUR; 11												21st	0
2002	HSBC Jaguar Racing	Jaguar R3B	Cosworth CR-4 3.0 V10										GBR; 11	FRA; 9	GER; Ret	HUN; 13	BEL; Ret	ITA; Ret	USA; Ret	JPN; Ret				21st	0
2005	West McLaren Mercedes	McLaren MP4-20	Mercedes FO 110R 3.0 V10	AUS; TD	MAL; TD	BHR; 5	SMR; TD	ESP; TD	MON	EUR	CAN; TD	USA; TD	FRA; TD	GBR; TD	GER									20th	4
2005	Team McLaren Mercedes	McLaren MP4-20	Mercedes FO 110R 3.0 V10													HUN	TUR; TD	ITA; TD	BEL	BRA	JPN; TD	CHN; TD		20th	4
2006	Team McLaren Mercedes	McLaren MP4-21	Mercedes FO 108S 2.4 V8	BHR	MAL	AUS	SMR	EUR	ESP	MON	GBR	CAN	USA	FRA; 7	GER; Ret	HUN; 2	TUR; 5	ITA; Ret	CHN; 5	JPN; 11	BRA; 8			11th	19
2010	BMW Sauber F1 Team	Sauber C29	Ferrari 056 2.4 V8	BHR; Ret	AUS; 12	MAL; DNS	CHN; Ret	ESP; Ret	MON; Ret	TUR; 11	CAN; Ret	EUR; 12	GBR; Ret	GER; 14	HUN; 7	BEL; 11	ITA; 14	SIN	JPN	KOR	BRA	ABU		17th	6
2011	Sauber F1 Team	Sauber C30	Ferrari 056 2.4 V8	AUS	MAL	CHN	TUR	ESP	MON	CAN; 12	EUR	GBR	GER	HUN	BEL	ITA	SIN	JPN	KOR	IND	ABU	BRA		20th	0
2012	HRT F1 Team	HRT F112	Cosworth CA2012 2.4 V8	AUS; DNQ	MAL; 21	CHN; 21	BHR; 20	ESP; 19	MON; Ret	CAN; Ret	EUR; 17	GBR; 20	GER; 21	HUN; 22	BEL; 18	ITA; 18	SIN; 17	JPN; 18	KOR; Ret	IND; Ret	ABU; 17	USA; 21	BRA; 17	25th	0

== Notes ==
Sporting positions
Preceded by Bobby Verdon-Roe	Formula Renault UK; Champion; 1992	Succeeded by Ivan Arias
Preceded by Jason Plato	Eurocup Formula Renault; Champion; 1992	Succeeded by Olivier Couvreur
Preceded by Michael Krumm	Japanese Formula 3 Championship; Champion; 1995	Succeeded by Juichi Wakisaka
Preceded by Ralf Schumacher	Formula Nippon; Champion; 1997	Succeeded by Satoshi Motoyama
Preceded by David Brabham; John Nielsen	All Japan Grand Touring Car Championship; GT500 Champion; 1997; With: Michael Krumm	Succeeded by Érik Comas; Masami Kageyama
Trade union offices
Preceded by Ralf Schumacher	GPDA Chairman; 2008–2010	Succeeded by Nick Heidfeld
Preceded by Rubens Barrichello	GPDA Chairman; 2012–2014	Succeeded by Alexander Wurz
