= 2000 Malaysian Grand Prix =

Formula One motor race held in 2000

Coordinates: 2°45′39″N 101°44′18″E

Race 17 of 17 in the 2000 Formula One World Championship
← Previous race	Next race →

Race details
- Date: 22 October 2000
- Official name: II Petronas Malaysian Grand Prix
- Location: Sepang International Circuit, Sepang, Selangor, Malaysia
- Course: Permanent racing facility
- Course length: 5.543 km (3.444 miles)
- Distance: 56 laps, 310.408 km (192.879 miles)
- Weather: Overcast, Very hot, Dry
- Attendance: 88,775 (Weekend)

Pole position
Driver	(Germany) Michael Schumacher	Ferrari
- Time: 1:37.397

Fastest lap
Driver	(Finland) Mika Häkkinen	McLaren-Mercedes
- Time: 1:38.543 on lap 34

Podium
First	(Germany) Michael Schumacher	Ferrari
Second	(United Kingdom) David Coulthard	McLaren-Mercedes
Third	(Brazil) Rubens Barrichello	Ferrari

The 2000 Malaysian Grand Prix (formally the II Petronas Malaysian Grand Prix) was a Formula One motor race held on 22 October 2000, at Sepang International Circuit in Sepang, Selangor, Malaysia. It was the 17th and final race of the 2000 Formula One World Championship, and the second Formula One Malaysian Grand Prix. Ferrari's Michael Schumacher won the 56-lap race from pole position. McLaren's David Coulthard finished second, with Michael Schumacher's teammate Rubens Barrichello finishing third.

McLaren's Mika Häkkinen, started second alongside Michael Schumacher. Häkkinen, on the other hand, was handed a ten-second stop-and-go penalty for being deemed to have jumped the start. Häkkinen was able to return to fourth, his ultimate finishing position. Coulthard, who started third, took the lead until the first round of pit stops. During their second stops, Michael Schumacher and teammate Rubens Barrichello traded the lead, with the former retaining it. Michael Schumacher won the race by holding off Coulthard in the final laps.

Michael Schumacher's victory was his ninth of the season, tying his own record set in 1995 and Nigel Mansell in 1992. Schumacher also tied Mansell's 108-point record. McLaren was unable to pass Ferrari's points total in the final race, confirming Ferrari as World Constructors' Champions. Coulthard's second-place finish helped him beat Barrichello to third in the World Drivers' Championship. Pedro Diniz's and Johnny Herbert's final race was at the Grand Prix; the Englishman retired after 161 race starts.

== Background ==
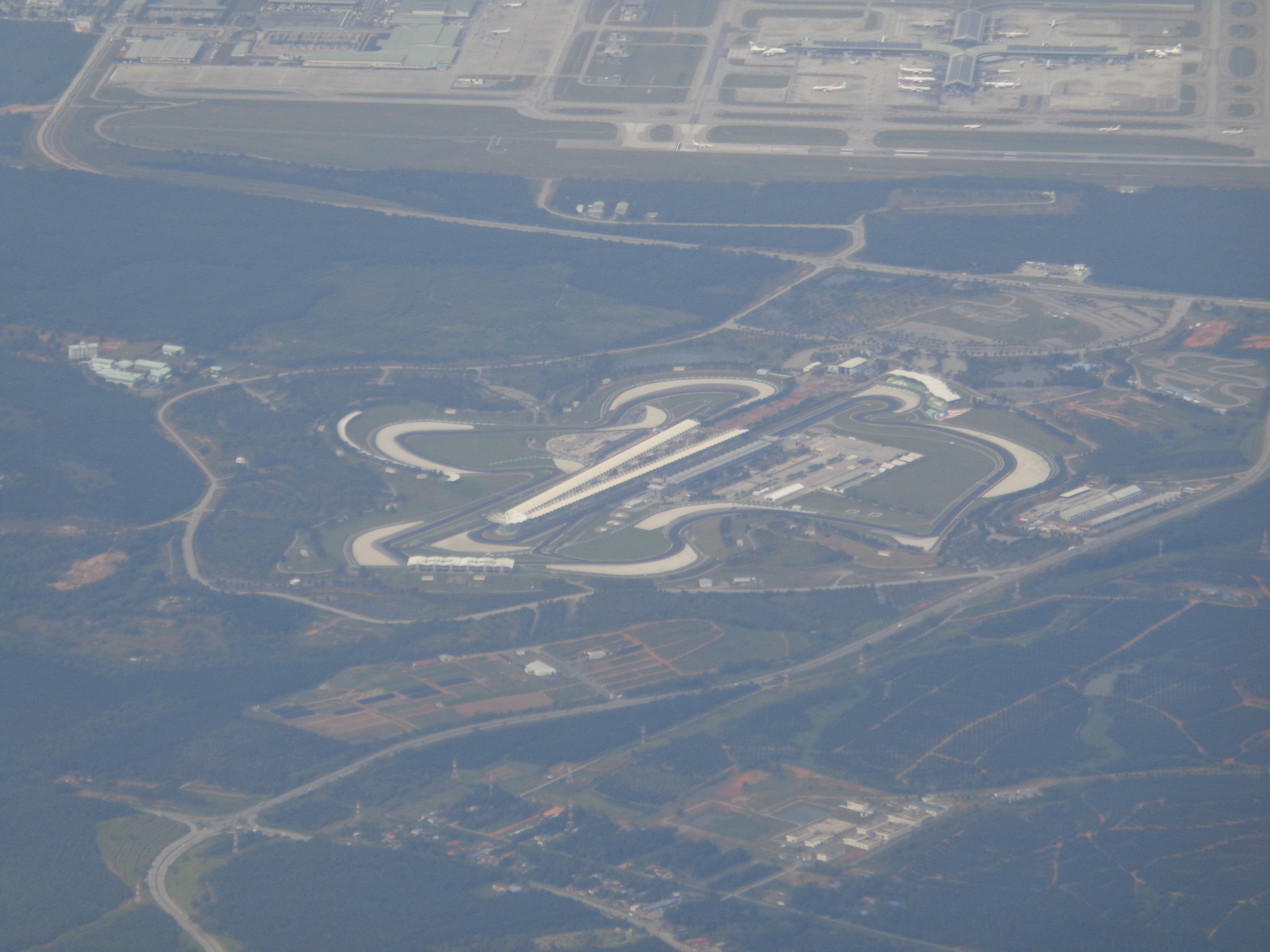
The Sepang International Circuit (pictured in 2016), where the race was held.

The 2000 Malaysian Grand Prix was the 17th and final race of the 2000 Formula One World Championship, held on 22 October 2000 at the 5.543 km (3.444 mi) clockwise Sepang International Circuit in Sepang, Selangor, Malaysia. It was the second Malaysian Grand Prix in the Formula One World Championship, and the only one to host the final round of a Formula One season. Sole tyre supplier Bridgestone brought the Soft dry compound and the Intermediate, Heavy Wet and Soft wet-weather compounds to the race.

Before the event, Ferrari driver Michael Schumacher won the season's World Drivers' Championship at the preceding Japanese Grand Prix. Schumacher led the championship with 98 championship points; McLaren's Mika Häkkinen was second on 86 points. With only 10 championship points available for the remaining race, Häkkinen was unable to catch Schumacher. McLaren's David Coulthard was third in the Drivers' Championship, 67 championship points behind Michael Schumacher and Häkkinen, and 58 championship points ahead of Ferrari's Rubens Barrichello. If Barrichello won the race and Coulthard finished outside the top six, he could still finish third. Although the Drivers' Championship was decided, the World Constructors' Championship was not. Ferrari led on 156 championship points, and McLaren were second on 143 championship points, with a maximum of 16 championship points available. McLaren needed to finish first and second in the race to become Constructors' Champions, but Ferrari needed one of its two drivers to finish second or collect three championship points by finishing fourth to win the title.

Protests against Malaysian Deputy Prime Minister Anwar Ibrahim's imprisonment threatened to disrupt the race. The campaign group, known as Free Anwar, were reported in the media that they would use the event to try to bid for Ibrahim's release. However, the campaign's director, Raja Petra Kamarudin, later announced that the event would be untouched.

The weekend was the final race for Jaguar's Johnny Herbert and Sauber's Pedro Diniz. Herbert's switch to CART was publicised shortly before, and he acknowledged that he had turned down an offer to test for the Williams team. Herbert said going into the weekend: "It's going to be a bit emotional getting out of the car for the last time and out of Formula One. But I'm really looking forward to the challenges that lie ahead of me." Diniz's future was uncertain, as he was rumoured to be moving to Prost after extensive negotiations with the team.

Following the Japanese Grand Prix on 8 October, six teams tested at European race tracks between 10 and 13 October to prepare for the upcoming race in Malaysia. Ferrari spent the four days with Luca Badoer, their test driver, who tested new mechanical components on the F1-2000 car at the Fiorano Circuit on a wet/dry track. He then moved to the Mugello Circuit where he tested brakes, car set-ups, tyre evaluation, endurance runs for the car's engines and continued trying out new car components. McLaren tested tyres on its MP4/15 chassis at the Circuit Ricardo Tormo for three days with test driver Olivier Panis and were joined by the Arrows team running a modified A21 vehicle fitted with a Peugeot-derived Asia Motor Technic V10 engine. Williams spent three days at the Circuit de Nevers Magny-Cours testing a modified FW22 car with its test driver Bruno Junqueira. British American Racing (BAR) tested a 002 car with their regular test driver Darren Manning for two days of aerodynamic testing at the Italian Variano circuit. Benetton cancelled a test in Barcelona but ran at the Silverstone Circuit a week later using new Supertec engines angled at 110° degrees. The Jaguar, Jordan, Minardi, Prost, and Sauber teams did not test during this period.

Eleven teams (each representing a different constructor) entered the event with each team fielding two drivers. Michael Schumacher was the bookmakers favourite to win the race. There were few alterations to cars for the race since teams were focused on the design of their 2001 vehicles. Changes centred on the requirement to increase the cooling of each car's mechanical components in order to cope with Malaysia's humid climate. Several teams opened additional slots on the rear of each vehicle's sides, while the Williams team installed chimneys used at the Hungarian Grand Prix for the Friday free practice sessions before returning to a conventional design model the following day. Benetton fitted a new engine specification and a changed weight distribution in Alexander Wurz's car.

== Practice ==
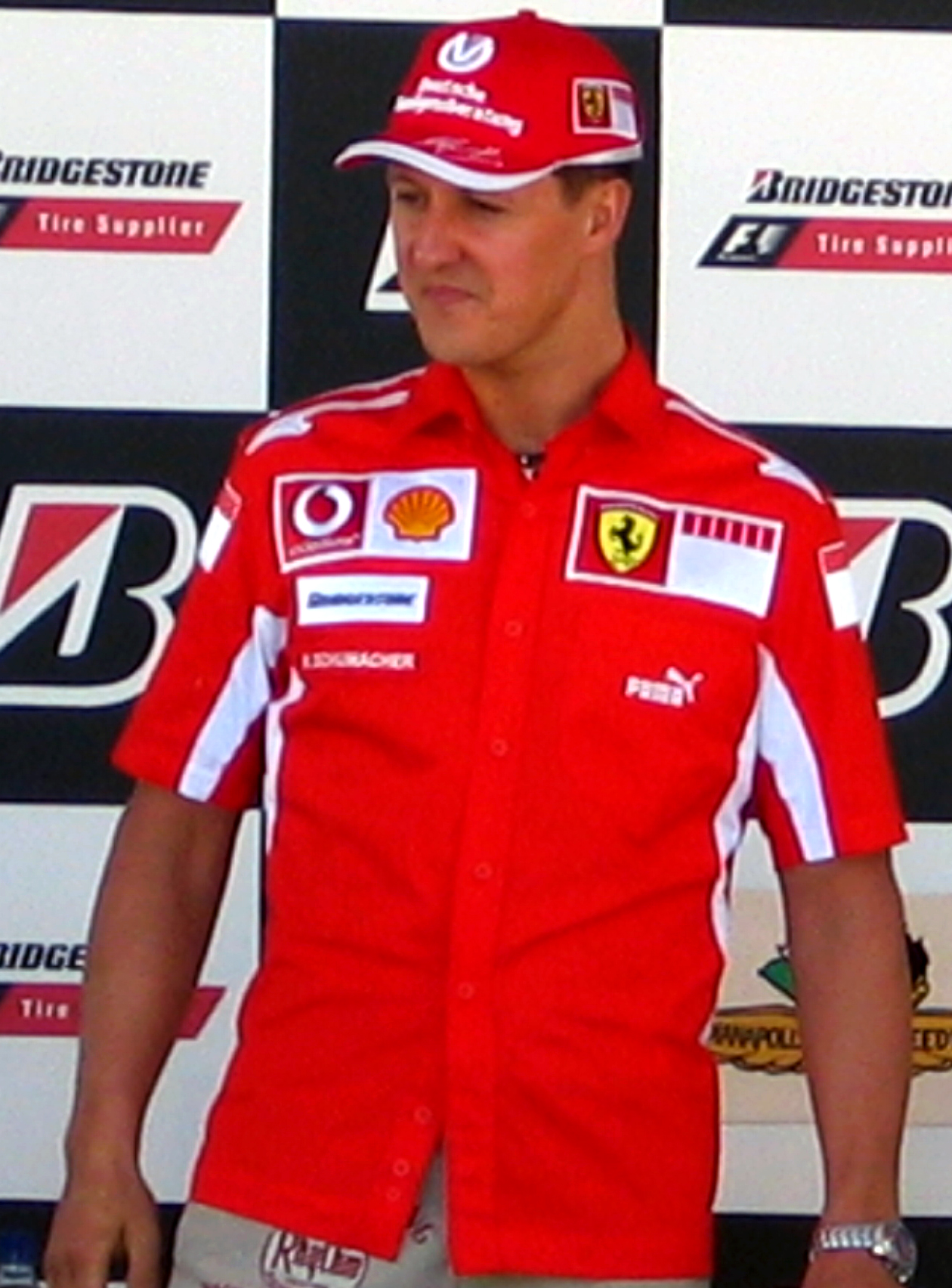
Michael Schumacher (pictured in 2005) the 2000 Formula One Drivers' Champion.

There were two one-hour sessions on Friday and two 45-minute sessions on Saturday before Sunday's race. The Friday morning and afternoon sessions were held in hot and dry weather. Several teams reported poor radio reception, possibly caused by the large grandstands located around the track. Michael Schumacher set the first session's fastest lap, at 1 minute and 40.290 seconds, seven-tenths of a second quicker than teammate Barrichello. Coulthard was third quickest despite spending most of the session dealing with a clutch problem. Häkkinen was fourth, ahead of Jaguar's Eddie Irvine and BAR's Jacques Villeneuve. Benetton's Giancarlo Fisichella, Herbert, BAR's Ricardo Zonta and Wurz (in his final race driving for Benetton) placed seventh through tenth. Some drivers went off the circuit and onto the grass during the session.

Häkkinen set the day's quickest time in the second practice session, a 1:40.262; Coulthard, his teammate, was third fastest. The Ferrari drivers remained fast, with Michael Schumacher second and Rubens Barrichello fourth, despite the latter developing flu symptoms. Jordan's Jarno Trulli was fifth quickest, ahead of Ralf Schumacher. Zonta ran quicker during the session and was seventh fastest. The Benetton drivers Fisichella and Wurz, along with Jordan's Heinz-Harald Frentzen completed the top ten. Coulthard temporarily drove onto the grass at the entry to KLIA Curve when he braked later than intended and went through the gravel to rejoin to the racing line. Mika Salo lost control of his Sauber car and went into the gravel trap at Sunway Lagoon Corner.

The weather remained hot and dry for the Saturday morning practice sessions. Lap times continued to fall prior to qualifying later in the day. Wurz was the fastest driver in the third practise session, lapping at 1:38.318, three thousandths of a second faster than Häkkinen in second. Coulthard set the third-fastest lap. Michael Schumacher was fourth with Barrichello sixth. Irvine was fifth. Zonta, Villeneuve, and Ralf Schumacher completed the top ten. An electronic engine sensor failure at the pit lane entry on his installation lap stopped Frentzen from setting a lap.

In the final practice session, Coulthard lapped fastest at 1:38.109 despite going into the gravel traps in the session. Michael Schumacher, Wurz, Häkkinen and Barrichello were in positions two to five. Jaguar drivers Herbert and Irvine were sixth and seventh. Jenson Button of Williams was eighth after changing his car's engine that had a hydraulic issue. Villeneuve and Trulli were ninth and tenth. Fisichella and Minardi's Gastón Mazzacane spun and stalled their cars after spinning. Frentzen lost control of his car, got beached in a gravel trap and stalled with five minutes left. The top 19 drivers set laps within 1.879 seconds of Wurz's, indicating a competitive field for qualifying and race field.

== Qualifying ==
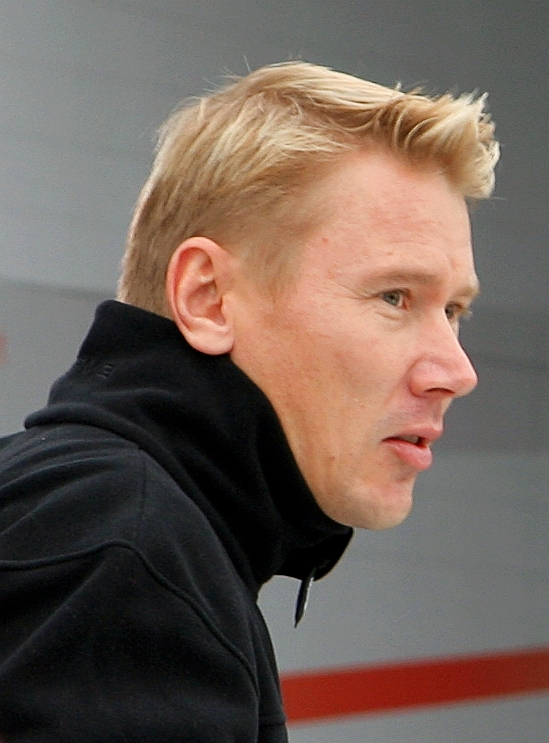
Mika Häkkinen (pictured in 2006) qualified in second position

Each driver was limited to twelve laps during Saturday's one-hour qualifying session, with the starting position determined by their fastest performance. The 107% rule was in force during this session, which required each driver to achieve a time within 107% of the fastest lap to qualify for the race. Qualifying was held in dry and hot weather. Michael Schumacher took his ninth pole position of the season and 32nd of his career with a lap time of 1:37.397 set with three minutes remaining after a second attempt with a rear wing change was cancelled owing to a flat-spotted tyre. Häkkinen, who finished 0.463 seconds behind than Schumacher due to a car imbalance, joined him on the grid's front row. Coulthard qualified third and during a refueling pit stop when a fire caused by a loose fuel line on his McLaren saw petrol seet into his left eye. He said that the issue could have escalated if swift action had not been taken. Barrichello, who still had the flu, qualified fourth having been demoted from second in qualifying's closing seconds. Wurz qualified fifth, his best qualifying result of the season. Although his car's engine was shut off due to a loss of power that caused him to slow down on the straights during his final run, Villeneuve set the sixth fastest lap time.

Despite believing he could have been faster as he slowed through turn 15, Irvine made setup adjustments and took seventh. Ralf Schumacher in eighth lost four-tenths of a second on his fastest lap. Trulli and Frentzen were ninth and tenth for Jordan. Zonta missed qualifying in the top ten by two-tenths of a second owing to braking issues. Herbert qualified twelfth in his final Formula One race and experienced understeer due to an engine change. He was ahead of Fisichella in 13th and Pedro de la Rosa in 14th, who set the fastest lap for the Arrows team on new tyres. Jos Verstappen, 15th, suffered from understeer, resulting in a driver error and damage to a radiator that leaked water in his race car. As a result, he drove Arrows' spare car. Button qualified 16th after experiencing traffic during qualifying and being unable to lap faster as he could not scrub down his tyres. Salo, 17th, had all four of his runs influenced by outside factors, and he lost downforce by following Irvine. Prost's Jean Alesi and Nick Heidfeld qualified 18th and 19th, respectively, due to climate-related performance issues. Diniz finished 20th due to understeer and a tyre mix-up. Minardi's Marc Gené (21st) and Mazzacane (22nd) completed the starting order.

=== Qualifying classification ===
Pos	No	Driver	Constructor	Time	Gap
1	3	(Germany) Michael Schumacher	Ferrari	1:37.397	—
2	1	(Finland) Mika Häkkinen	McLaren-Mercedes	1:37.860	+0.463
3	2	(United Kingdom) David Coulthard	McLaren-Mercedes	1:37.889	+0.492
4	4	(Brazil) Rubens Barrichello	Ferrari	1:37.896	+0.499
5	12	(Austria) Alexander Wurz	Benetton-Playlife	1:38.644	+1.247
6	22	(Canada) Jacques Villeneuve	BAR-Honda	1:38.653	+1.256
7	7	(United Kingdom) Eddie Irvine	Jaguar-Cosworth	1:38.696	+1.319
8	9	(Germany) Ralf Schumacher	Williams-BMW	1:38.739	+1.342
9	6	(Italy) Jarno Trulli	Jordan-Mugen-Honda	1:38.909	+1.512
10	5	(Germany) Heinz-Harald Frentzen	Jordan-Mugen-Honda	1:38.988	+1.591
11	23	(Brazil) Ricardo Zonta	BAR-Honda	1:39.158	+1.761
12	8	(United Kingdom) Johnny Herbert	Jaguar-Cosworth	1:39.331	+1.934
13	11	(Italy) Giancarlo Fisichella	Benetton-Playlife	1:39.387	+1.990
14	18	(Spain) Pedro de la Rosa	Arrows-Supertec	1:39.443	+2.046
15	19	(Netherlands) Jos Verstappen	Arrows-Supertec	1:39.489	+2.092
16	10	(United Kingdom) Jenson Button	Williams-BMW	1:39.563	+2.166
17	17	(Finland) Mika Salo	Sauber-Petronas	1:39.591	+2.194
18	14	(France) Jean Alesi	Prost-Peugeot	1:40.065	+2.668
19	15	(Germany) Nick Heidfeld	Prost-Peugeot	1:40.148	+2.751
20	16	(Brazil) Pedro Diniz	Sauber-Petronas	1:40.521	+3.124
21	20	(Spain) Marc Gené	Minardi-Fondmetal	1:40.662	+3.265
22	21	(Argentina) Gastón Mazzacane	Minardi-Fondmetal	1:42.078	+4.681
107% time: 1:44.214

== Warm-up ==
The drivers took to the track at 10:30 Malaysian Standard Time (GMT +8) for a half hour warm-up session in warm, dry weather. Lap times in the session were about two and a half seconds slower than in qualifying because vehicles were fitted with race-specific bodywork and radiators. Zonta set the quickest lap time, a 1:40.032, with two minutes left. Both McLaren drivers finished in the top four—Häkkinen was second, slightly slower than Zonta, while Coulthard was fourth. Michael Schumacher, in third place, separated them.

== Race ==
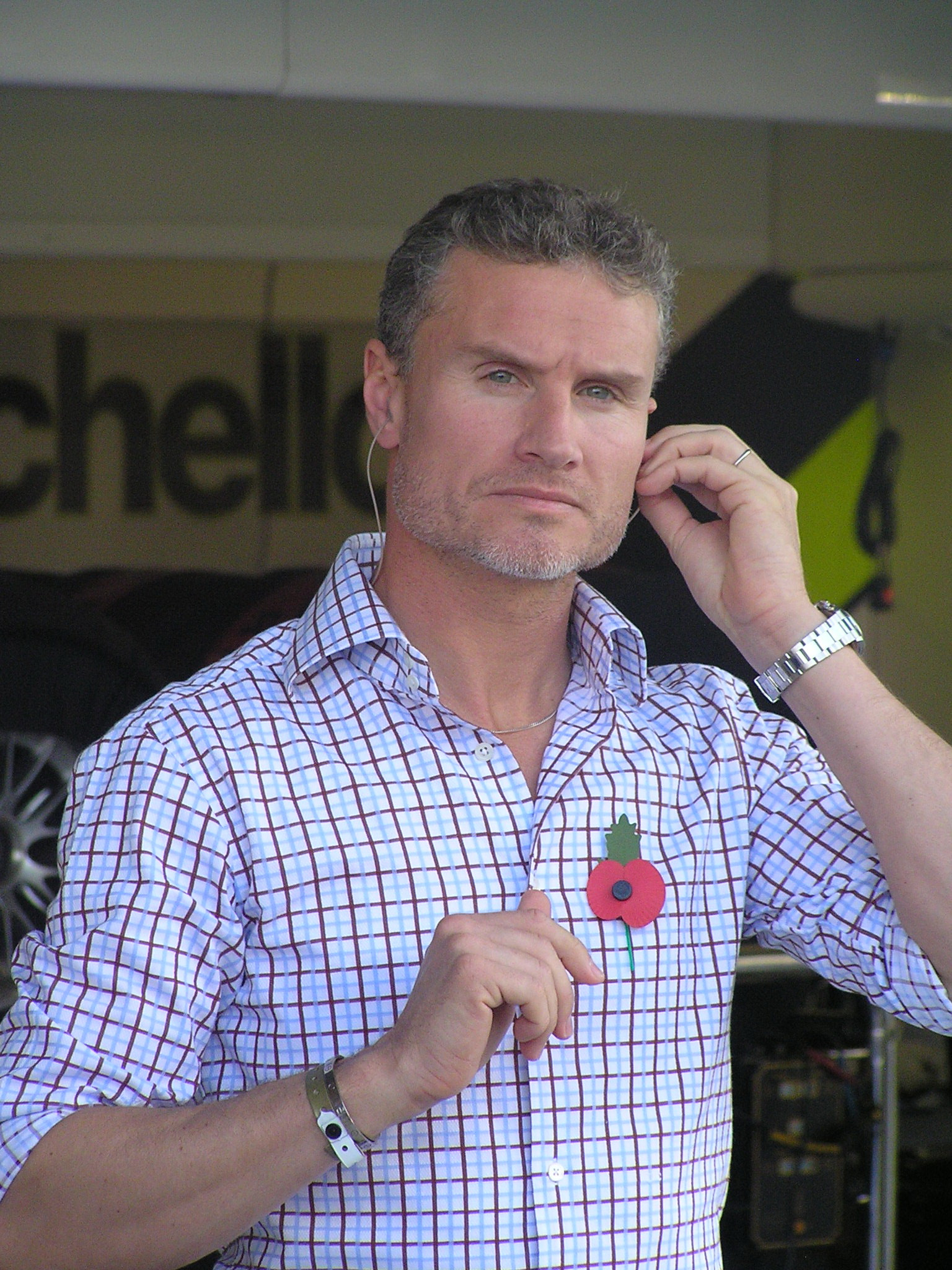
David Coulthard (pictured in 2009) finished second.

The 56-lap race that ran over 310.408 km (192.879 mi) started at 15:00 local time. The conditions for the race were dry and cloudy with the air temperature 32 °C (90 °F) and the track temperature 35 °C (95 °F); humidity was at 60 per cent. Tyre wear was not a major concern for the race. Cockpit temperatures were at their highest of the season due to the warm and humid climate and cooling was a major worry. When the red lights went out to start the race, Häkkinen, who started alongside Michael Schumacher, jumped the start by moving early, appearing to stop before the start, and then taking the lead. Coulthard moved faster off the line, passing Michael Schumacher on the outside for second into the first corner.

Diniz attempted to pass Heidfeld who was alongside De la Rosa at the second turn, but he overshot the entry and crashed into the rear of Alesi's car, which was spun around and made contact with Heidfeld. Heidfeld pushed De la Rosa into the wall; De la Rosa, Diniz, and Heidfeld became the race's first retirements, while Alesi continued. Both Minardi drivers were forced wide in avoidance. On the same lap, Ralf Schumacher (affected by a major cold) was forced onto the grass while attempting to pass Irvine, and Trulli damaged his front wing after colliding with the Jaguar. Trulli stopped for a new front wing, while Verstappen spun off. These crashes necessitated the deployment of the safety car driven by Bernd Mayländer to slow the race.

When the safety car entered the pit lane at the conclusion of the second lap, the race resumed with Häkkinen leading. Häkkinen let teammate Coulthard pass for the lead on lap three, and he was later overtaken by both Ferrari drivers after running wide at a corner on the same lap. At the competition of the third lap, Coulthard led from Michael Schumacher, Barrichello, Häkkinen, Wurz, and Villeneuve. Because he was driving a lightly fuelled car, Coulthard began to pull away from Michael Schumacher almost immediately with successive fastest laps. The stewards imposed a ten-second stop-and-go penalty on Häkkinen on lap four for jumping the start. Zonta moved up to eighth place after overtaking Button and Herbert. On the same lap, Button lost another position to Salo. Meanwhile, Verstappen began to make up ground, taking 16th place from Gené.

Häkkinen took his penalty on lap five, losing around 23.8 seconds due to the pit lane entry being positioned on the outside of the last turn, requiring drivers to take a longer line than those on the track, and he re-entered the track in 19th. Frentzen went off the track and entered the pit lane for repairs on the same lap. Verstappen passed Ralf Schumacher for 14th place. Coulthard set a new fastest lap of the race, a 1:40.679 on lap seven, extending his lead over Michael Schumacher to 3.6 seconds, who was 2.6 seconds ahead of teammate Barrichello. Wurz was 4.2 seconds behind Barrichello but was steadily pulling ahead of Villeneuve in fifth. Verstappen overtook Fisichella for eleventh before Frentzen retired after a power steering failure on lap seven after one exploratory lap and later a loss of hydraulic system pressure. Trulli passed Mazzacane for 16th place on the following lap. Salo overtook Herbert for eighth position on lap nine, while Ralf Schumacher's car began to develop mechanical issues.

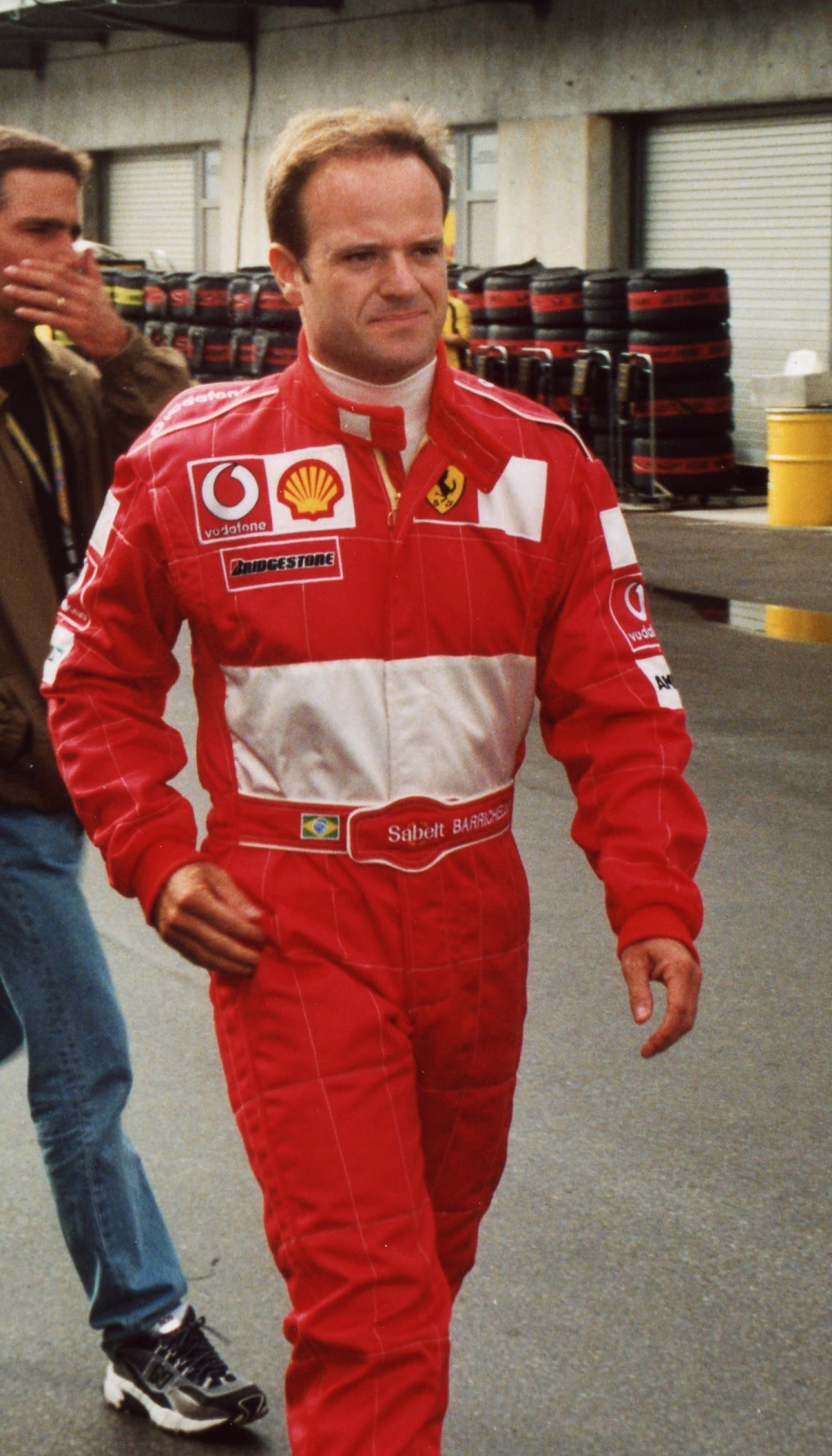
Rubens Barrichello (pictured in 2002) finished third.

On the tenth lap, Coulthard ran off the track at turn six, with grass penetrating his left-hand radiator inlet and blocking the hot air release pipes. This increased the engine temperature in Coulthard's car, and McLaren was forced to amend his race strategy when his engine overheated too much. Further down, Gené lost 13th position to Alesi, as Trulli made a pit stop for further repairs to his car. Coulthard had a 5.6-second lead over Michael Schumacher by the start of lap twelve, with Verstappen passing Button for tenth. Häkkinen moved up to 14th after passing Ralf Schumacher and Gené in the next three laps. Salo and Alesi became the first drivers to make scheduled pit stops on lap 16. Coulthard made an early pit stop one lap later to clear the debris from his radiator, resolving his overheating problem. He rejoined the circuit in sixth. The McLaren duo were on different strategies, with Coulthard making two pit stops and Häkkinen one. Button became the race's next retirement when his engine failed on lap 19. Michael Schumacher continued to set successive fastest laps, building an 8.8-second lead over Rubens Barrichello by the time of first pit stop on lap 24 after becoming concerned that Coulthard was quicker than him. Barrichello led for one lap before his pit stop on the following lap returned Michael Schumacher to the lead.

By the end of lap 26, all of the leading drivers on two-stop strategies had made their pit stops. Michael Schumacher led from Coulthard, Barrichello, Herbert, Verstappen, and Villeneuve. Häkkinen passed Villeneuve on lap 28, however he went off the track and let Villeneuve back past. Herbert made his only pit stop on the same lap, stalled, and rejoined the circuit in twelfth. Gené, Mazzacane, Ralf Schumacher and Verstappen made pit stops between laps 28 and 29. Villeneuve attempted to reclaim fourth from Häkkinen at turn 15 on the 30th lap, but he braked later than expected. Häkkinen made a pit stop on lap 35, emerging behind Villeneuve and Irvine. Coulthard closed to within two seconds of Michael Schumacher when he completed his second pit stop at the conclusion of lap 38. He returned to driving on a set of scrubbed front tyres. Gené stopped next to the pit lane barrier on the same lap and retired due to a left-rear wheel failure.

Michael Schumacher made a pit stop on the following lap and retained the lead. Barrichello took the lead for one lap and made his pit stop on lap 41. This allowed Michael Schumacher to retake the lead. Coulthard had closed to within two seconds of Michael Schumacher who was nursing his tyres by the start of lap 45. Ralf Schumacher's team called him into the garage to retire to prevent a failure of a malfunctioning engine oil supply system that was detected by the electronic data transmitter and transmitted to Williams' command centre that lap. Zonta retired a gravel trap with a blown engine that gradually became hotter two laps later. On the 50th lap, Herbert's car suffered a broken right driveshaft that caused a rear suspension failure under braking for the fourth corner, causing him to lose both rear wheels. He went through the gravel trap and into the turn four tyre barrier. Herbert exited his car unaided, and track marshals assisted him on a stretcher for transport to the circuit's medical centre for precautionary x-rays. Mazzacane was the race's and season's final retirement with an engine piston failure on lap 54.

Michael Schumacher held off Coulthard and crossed the finish line first on lap 56 to claim his ninth victory of the season and 44th of his career in a time of 1'35:54.235, at an average speed of 194.199 km/h (120.670 mph). He equalled the wins record set by himself in 1995 and Nigel Mansell in 1992. Coulthard finished second in his McLaren, 0.7 seconds behind Michael Schumacher, with Barrichello third in the other Ferrari and Häkkinen fourth. Villeneuve in fifth achieved his third consecutive points-scoring finish and Irvine who was 1.8 seconds behind completed the points-scorers in sixth. Ferrari's race results earned the team the 2000 World Constructors' Championship and their 10th in Formula One. Wurz, Salo, Fisichella, Verstappen and Alesi, Trulli (who had a slow puncture) and Mazzacane were the final classified finishers.

=== Post-race ===
The top three drivers appeared on the podium to collect their trophies and in the subsequent press conference. Michael Schumacher said that he and his team were delighted to win the race and the Constructors' Championship. He also added that he win with the use of team strategy after he realised Coulthard was quicker than him. Coulthard apologised to Michael Schumacher for his comments about him throughout the season. He also stated that he would not be retracting any comments made concerning Schumacher's driving technique, but rather the manner in which they were expressed. Barrichello called his race "lonely" because to the lack of on-track action. He also stated that the hot temperatures he dealt with were emotionally taxing owing to his illness.

McLaren team principal Ron Dennis congratulated Ferrari and Michael Schumacher for winning both the Drivers' and Constructors' Championships. Michael Schumacher expressed hope that his success in 2000 would usher in a new era of success for Ferrari. Similarly, their technical director, Ross Brawn, believe that the team may improve more in the coming seasons: "We've got to build from this success and I'm sure we will do and get all the support from Italy and Ferrari that we will need to continue in this vein." Ferrari celebrated their wins in both championships and thanked their followers for their continuing support at an event at the Mugello Circuit in front of 50,000 people.

Häkkinen believed that if he had not received his stop-and-go penalty, he would have won the race. He added that his car was still before the starting procedure began, and that it moved before the sequence was completed. Mercedes-Benz Motorsport head Norbert Haug praised McLaren for their form and work during the season and reflected on the race, "We had the speed again today, but Mika was penalised and got a stop and go. He was on the right strategy, but if you are in the pits for 10 seconds, you are not going to win. He still came in fourth and that is a great achievement. David also put a lot of pressure on Michael, until the final lap and that is a great performance."

Villeneuve was pleased with his fifth-place performance given how his vehicle performed at the start of the season, commenting, "We have made good progress and improved the car throughout the season. We have got to know the car better in terms of set-up, which has allowed us to push harder in races and challenge consistently for points." Irvine stated that he was glad to complete the year with a single championship point and that the result highlighted the car's potential, adding, "There is obviously a lot of work to do over the winter, and if that goes well, I think we can start next season in a much better position."

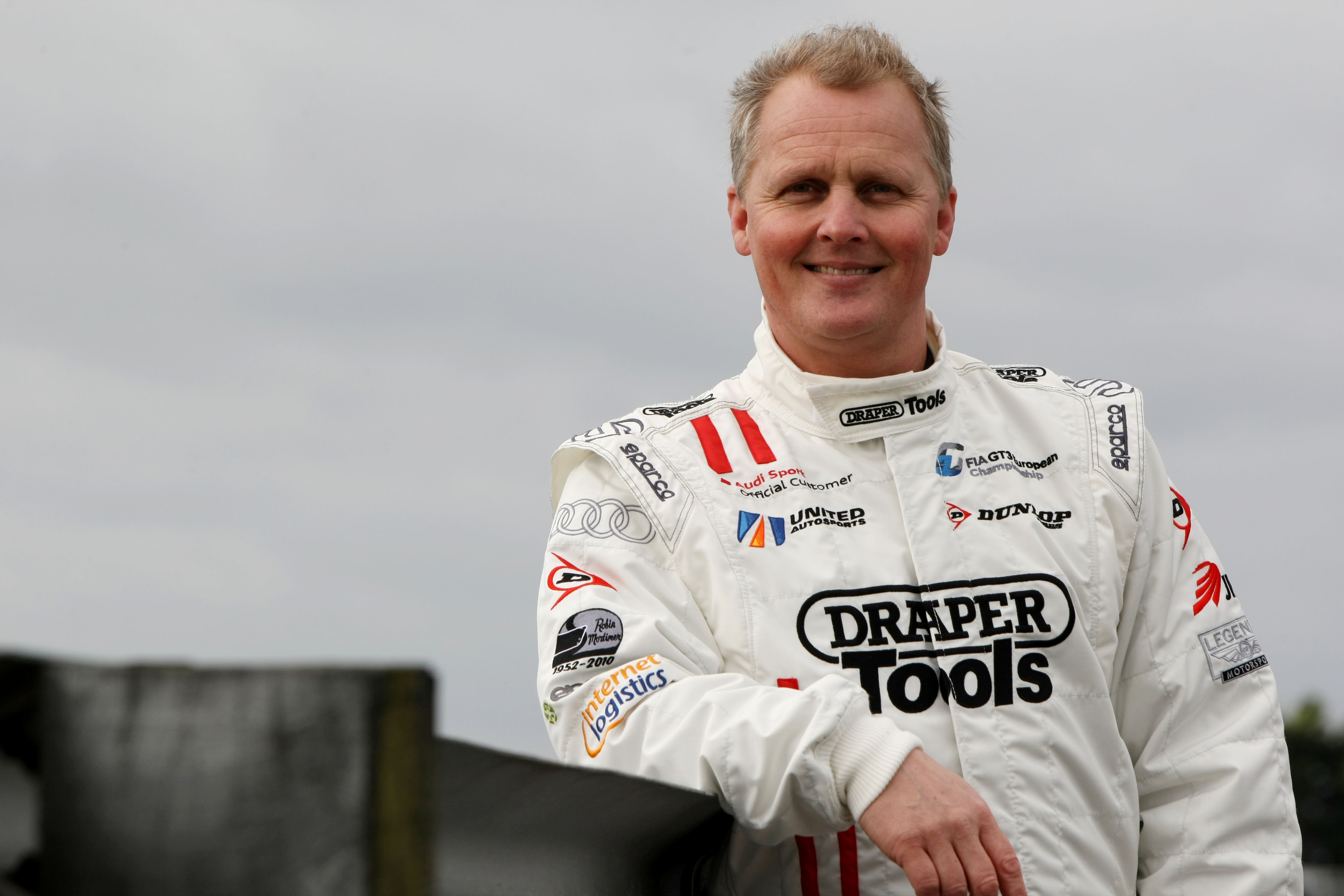
Johnny Herbert (pictured in 2011) retired from Formula One following the Malaysian Grand Prix.

Herbert was not injured in the crash, except for a bruised left knee. He expressed disappointment in his late exit in his final Formula One race, saying that "I'm pretty disappointed to have a good race ruined by a failure such as that." He remarked, "I guess it was inevitable that, because I began my career being carried to the car, I would end it being carried out of it. There is nothing like ending your career with a bang!" Herbert left Formula One after 12 years with 161 race starts and 3 race victories. Jaguar technical director Gary Anderson traced the suspension failure to a broken link on the rear right suspension rod. Herbert continued to participate in motor racing in 2001 driving in the 24 Hours of Le Mans and the American Le Mans Series. He later abandoned plans to drive in CART and became a test driver for the Arrows team in February 2001. Diniz, meanwhile, could not find a race seat and became a shareholder in the Prost team, helping the team become more competitive.

=== Race classification ===
Drivers who scored championship points are denoted in bold.

Pos	No	Driver	Constructor	Laps	Time/Retired	Grid	Points
1	3	(Germany) **Michael Schumacher**	**Ferrari**	56	1:35:54.235	1	10
2	2	(United Kingdom) **David Coulthard**	**McLaren-Mercedes**	56	+0.732	3	6
3	4	(Brazil) **Rubens Barrichello**	**Ferrari**	56	+18.444	4	4
4	1	(Finland) **Mika Häkkinen**	**McLaren-Mercedes**	56	+35.269	2	3
5	22	(Canada) **Jacques Villeneuve**	**BAR-Honda**	56	+1:10.692	6	2
6	7	(United Kingdom) **Eddie Irvine**	**Jaguar-Cosworth**	56	+1:12.568	7	1
7	12	(Austria) Alexander Wurz	Benetton-Playlife	56	+1:29.314	5	
8	17	(Finland) Mika Salo	Sauber-Petronas	55	+1 Lap	17	
9	11	(Italy) Giancarlo Fisichella	Benetton-Playlife	55	+1 Lap	13	
10	19	(Netherlands) Jos Verstappen	Arrows-Supertec	55	+1 Lap	15	
11	14	(France) Jean Alesi	Prost-Peugeot	55	+1 Lap	18	
12	6	(Italy) Jarno Trulli	Jordan-Mugen-Honda	55	+1 Lap	9	
13	21	(Argentina) Gastón Mazzacane	Minardi-Fondmetal	50	Engine	22	
Ret	8	(United Kingdom) Johnny Herbert	Jaguar-Cosworth	48	Suspension/Accident	12	
Ret	23	(Brazil) Ricardo Zonta	BAR-Honda	46	Engine	11	
Ret	9	(Germany) Ralf Schumacher	Williams-BMW	43	Hydraulics	8	
Ret	20	(Spain) Marc Gené	Minardi-Fondmetal	36	Wheel	21	
Ret	10	(United Kingdom) Jenson Button	Williams-BMW	18	Engine	16	
Ret	5	(Germany) Heinz-Harald Frentzen	Jordan-Mugen-Honda	7	Electrical	10	
Ret	18	(Spain) Pedro de la Rosa	Arrows-Supertec	0	Collision	14	
Ret	15	(Germany) Nick Heidfeld	Prost-Peugeot	0	Collision	19	
Ret	16	(Brazil) Pedro Diniz	Sauber-Petronas	0	Collision	20	

== Final championship standings ==
Drivers' Championship standings

+/–	Pos	Driver	Points
	1	(Germany) Michael Schumacher*	108
	2	(Finland) Mika Häkkinen	89
	3	(United Kingdom) David Coulthard	73
	4	(Brazil) Rubens Barrichello	62
	5	(Germany) Ralf Schumacher	24

Constructors' Championship standings

+/–	Pos	Constructor	Points
	1	(Italy) Ferrari*	170
	2	(United Kingdom) McLaren-Mercedes	152
	3	(United Kingdom) Williams-BMW	36
	4	(Italy) Benetton-Playlife	20
	5	(United Kingdom) BAR-Honda	20
Sources:

- Note: Only the top five positions are included for both sets of standings.
- Bold text and an asterisk indicates the 2000 World Champions.

Previous race: 2000 Japanese Grand Prix	FIA Formula One World Championship; 2000 season	Next race: 2001 Australian Grand Prix
Previous race: 1999 Malaysian Grand Prix	Malaysian Grand Prix	Next race: 2001 Malaysian Grand Prix
