= Hart 1030 engine =

Hart 1030

Overview
- Manufacturer: (United Kingdom) Hart
- Production: 1998–1999

Layout
- Configuration: 72° V10
- Displacement: 3.0 L (183.1 cu in)
- Valvetrain: 40-valve, DOHC, four-valves per cylinder

Combustion
- Fuel system: Electronic multi-point indirect fuel injection
- Fuel type: Gasoline
- Cooling system: Water-cooled

Output
- Power output: 700–715 hp (522–533 kW; 710–725 PS)
- Torque output: 250–290 lb⋅ft (339–393 N⋅m)

Dimensions
- Length: 602 mm (23.7 in)
- Width: 595 mm (23.4 in)
- Dry weight: 120 kg (260 lb)

The Hart 1030 is a four-stroke, naturally aspirated, 3.0-litre, V10 racing engine, designed, developed and tuned by Brian Hart of Hart Racing Engines, between 1998 and 1999. It was the last engine to be tuned and made by Hart, and the last engine to use design knowledge and technological property of Hart Racing Engines. It produced 700–715 hp (522–533 kW), and was used solely by the Arrows team, but proved to be unsuccessful. The best results for the engine were a 4-6 finish at Monaco for Mika Salo and Pedro Diniz (respectively), a 5th-place finish for Pedro Diniz at infamous rain-soaked Belgian Grand Prix, and a 6th-place finish for Pedro de la Rosa at Australia, in 1999.

== Applications ==
- Arrows A19
- Arrows A20
