= 1999 French Grand Prix =

Race 7 of 16 in the 1999 Formula One World Championship
← Previous race	Next race →
- Circuit de Nevers Magny-Cours (last modified in 1992)

Race details
- Date: 27 June 1999
- Official name: Mobil 1 Grand Prix de France 1999
- Location: Circuit de Nevers Magny-Cours, Magny-Cours, France
- Course: Permanent racing facility
- Course length: 4.250 km (2.641 miles)
- Distance: 72 laps, 305.814 km (190.024 miles)
- Weather: Overcast, mild, dry at first, rain later on

Pole position
Driver	(Brazil) Rubens Barrichello	Stewart-Ford
- Time: 1:38.441

Fastest lap
Driver	(United Kingdom) David Coulthard	McLaren-Mercedes
- Time: 1:19.227 on lap 8

Podium
First	(Germany) Heinz-Harald Frentzen	Jordan-Mugen-Honda
Second	(Finland) Mika Häkkinen	McLaren-Mercedes
Third	(Brazil) Rubens Barrichello	Stewart-Ford

The 1999 French Grand Prix (formally the Mobil 1 Grand Prix de France 1999) was a Formula One motor race held on 27 June 1999 at the Circuit de Nevers Magny-Cours near Magny-Cours, France. It was the seventh race of the 1999 Formula One season. The 72-lap race was won by Heinz-Harald Frentzen driving a Jordan car after starting from fifth position. Mika Häkkinen finished second driving for McLaren, with Rubens Barrichello finishing third for the Stewart team. The remaining points-scoring positions were filled by Ralf Schumacher (Williams), Michael Schumacher (Ferrari), Eddie Irvine (Ferrari).

As a consequence of the race, Häkkinen extended his lead in the World Drivers' Championship to eight points over Schumacher, with Irvine a further 14 behind. In the World Constructors' Championship, McLaren reduced the lead over Ferrari to six points with Williams passing Benetton for fourth position, 43 points behind Ferrari.

== Report ==
=== Background ===
Heading into the seventh round of the season, McLaren driver Mika Häkkinen was leading the World Drivers' Championship with 34 points; Ferrari driver Michael Schumacher was second on 30 points, 4 points behind Häkkinen. Behind Häkkinen and Schumacher in the Drivers' Championship, Eddie Irvine was third on 25 points in the other Ferrari, with Heinz-Harald Frentzen and Giancarlo Fisichella both on 13 points. In the Constructors' Championship, Ferrari were leading on 55 points and McLaren were second on 46 points, with Jordan third on 16 points.

Following the Canadian Grand Prix on 13 June, the teams conducted testing sessions at the Magny-Cours circuit from 16 to 18 June. David Coulthard (McLaren) set the fastest time on the first day, while Eddie Irvine was fastest on the second and final day of testing. Williams made modifications to the suspension of their cars, resulting in several spins. Among the other teams, Minardi elected to perform aerodynamic mapping work at the Automotive Safety Center using their test driver Gastón Mazzacane. Arrows performed shakedown runs at the Santa Pod Raceway.

On 16 June, Jordan driver and 1996 World Drivers' Champion Damon Hill announced that he would retire from Formula One racing at the end of the season. Hill later said a factor in his decision was the amount of testing undertaken by the teams and his own personal performance during the season, although he considered retiring with immediate effect.

=== Practice and qualifying ===
Two practice sessions were held before the Sunday race—one on Friday from 11:00 to 14:00 local time, and a second on Saturday morning between 09:00 to 11:00. The first practice session took place in dry conditions. The ambient temperature was 24 °C (75 °F).

The second practice session was held in overcast and wet weather conditions, with a drop in the track temperature to 19 °C (66 °F) and the ambient temperature to 20 °C (68 °F).

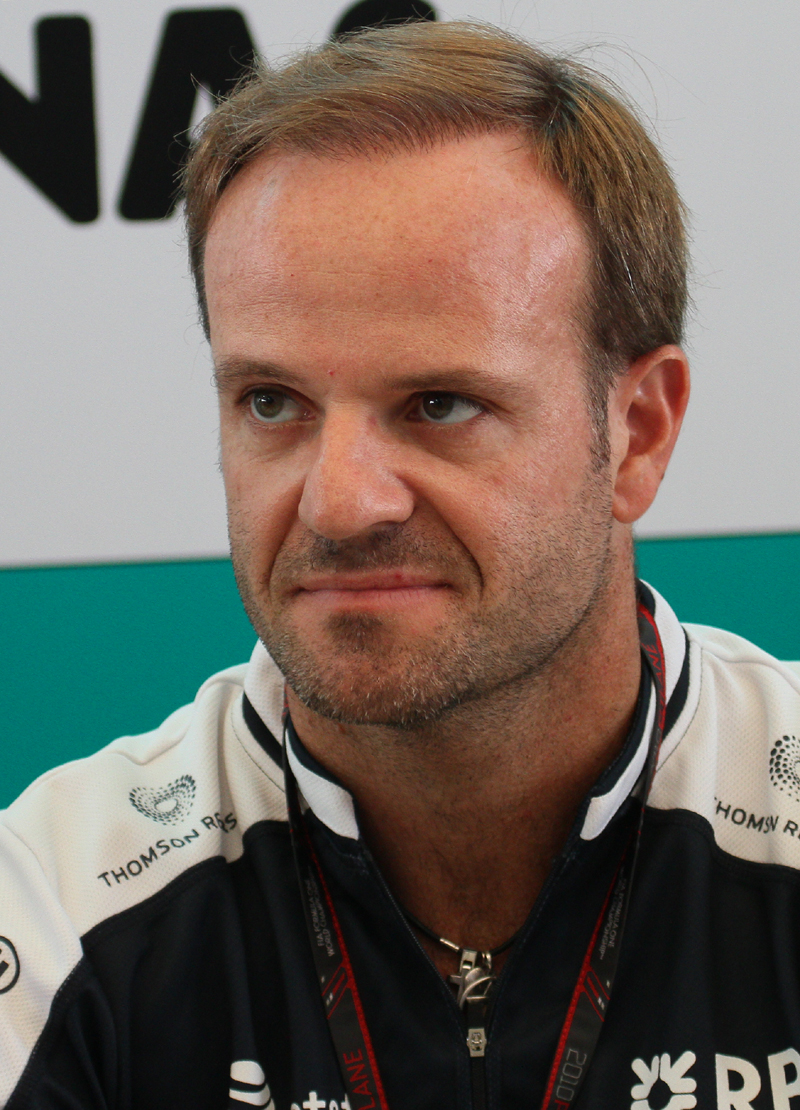
Rubens Barrichello, who took pole position in his Stewart car

Saturday afternoon's qualifying session was held from 13:00 to 14:00 local time. Each driver was limited to twelve laps with the implementation of a 107% rule to exclude slow drivers from competing in the race. The session was held in wet conditions; the ambient and track temperature were both 18 °C (64 °F). Rubens Barrichello clinched his first pole position of the season, in his Stewart, in a time of 1:38.441. He was joined on the front row by Jean Alesi, who was four-tenths of a second behind. Olivier Panis was third in his Prost. Coulthard took fourth despite going into the gravel and spinning off late in the session. Heinz-Harald Frentzen was fifth, with Michael Schumacher completing the top six.

Due to the wet conditions, a then-record five drivers - Damon Hill, Marc Gené, Luca Badoer, Pedro de la Rosa, and Toranosuke Takagi - all failed to meet the 107% time. Hill missed out by just three milliseconds, the slimmest-ever margin. Due to the wet conditions, and the drivers' competitiveness in practice, all five drivers were permitted to race due to "exceptional circumstances".

=== Race ===
On Sunday morning, a pre-race warm up session took place at 09:30 local time, and lasted for 30 minutes. It took place in wet weather conditions, with the track temperature at 15 °C (59 °F) and the ambient temperature was 14 °C (57 °F). Coulthard set the fastest lap with a time of 1:32.091. He was followed on the timesheets by Ferrari drivers Irvine and Michael Schumacher who completed the top three positions.

The race took place in the afternoon from 14:00 local time, and started on a dry track, with an ambient temperature of 19 °C (66 °F) and a track temperature of 20 °C (68 °F). Rubens Barrichello managed to get away quickly to maintain first position. Jean Alesi, starting second, was slower than Barrichello and held up drivers after the start. David Coulthard was able to pass Alesi on lap two. Mika Häkkinen stormed up through the field from his starting position of fourteenth to ninth place by lap two. Häkkinen caught and passed Olivier Panis for sixth place and then caught Michael Schumacher in fifth on lap five. As this happened Herbert retired thanks to a gearbox problem. Coulthard passed Barrichello on lap six by outbraking him into the Adelaide hairpin. And then Diniz retired thanks to transmission failure on lap 7. Mika Häkkinen attempted to pass Michael Schumacher on lap nine by slipstreaming him down the long straight before the Adelaide hairpin, but was on the outside coming into Adelaide and Schumacher was able to stay just ahead. Häkkinen repeated the move on the very next lap, this time to the inside, and was able to stay in front of Schumacher. Schumacher at this point was struggling on a car that was set up for a wet race.

David Coulthard suffered a complete electrical failure (alternator failure) on lap 10 and retired, giving the lead back to Rubens Barrichello. Mika Häkkinen caught Heinz-Harald Frentzen on lap 12, then hounded him for three laps before passing him in a repeat of the move he had pulled on Michael Schumacher earlier. Frentzen tried to fight back, and was able to pull alongside Häkkinen, but Häkkinen's inside line through turn six cemented his position. Behind in the midfield Irvine overtook another car. This time it was Alexander Wurz in the Benetton. On Lap 16 Häkkinen caught up with Jean Alesi quickly, but was stuck behind him for several more laps. Häkkinen used the slipstream to pull alongside Alesi on lap 19, but they both locked up into Adelaide and only barely made the corner. Häkkinen was able to stay ahead, and began to chase down Barrichello, four and a half seconds ahead.

Rain began to fall on lap 21. Eddie Irvine pulled into the pits just as the rain started, but Ferrari was not ready for him and his pit stop took 43 seconds (42.9) after his mechanics initially put a fresh set of dry-weather tyres on his car. Well after the Irvine pit stop disaster happened Giancarlo Fisichella spun, without retiring. A scramble into the pits ensued, but the leaders were all able to hold their positions. One lap after Hill pitted he got a puncture, because he hit a wall. Jean Alesi spun out of third place on lap 25 in Chateaux d'Eau and retired, because he beached his car in the gravel. The safety car was then deployed due to the amount of water on the track. On Lap 26 Villeneuve pitted for wet tyres, and before Villeneuve pitted Zonta spun. The amount of water on the track was so great that four drivers – Jacques Villeneuve, Alexander Wurz, Marc Gené and Alessandro Zanardi – spun while following the safety car. On Lap 29 Takagi pitted for a new nose. Damon Hill retired with electrical failure while behind the safety car. The safety car came in at the end of lap 35. The restart went cleanly, with no place changes amongst the front-runners.

Mika Häkkinen made a dive-bomb attempt to pass Rubens Barrichello under braking into Adelaide on lap 38, but he put his inside wheels up onto the curbing and spun the car a full 360 degrees. Mika Häkkinen fell to seventh place. Michael Schumacher passed Heinz-Harald Frentzen through Adelaide on the next lap. Schumacher made a very late braking move to momentarily pass Barrichello into Adelaide on lap 42, but he went very wide and Barrichello cut back under Schumacher to retake the lead. Schumacher repeated the move two laps later, but this time he didn't go wide and was able to gain first place.

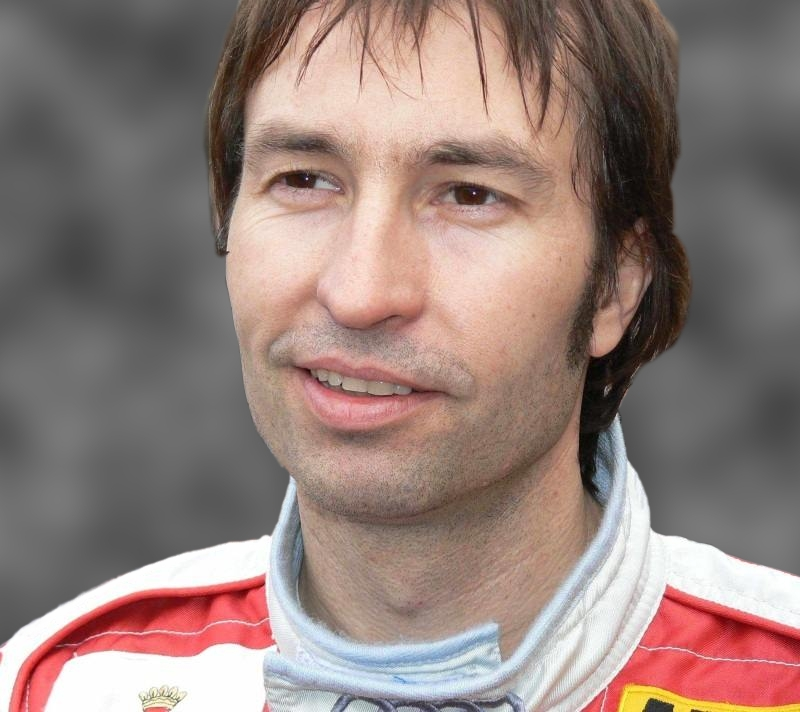
Heinz-Harald Frentzen. who won the race by 11 seconds (picture taken in 2006 while driving for Audi in the DTM series)

After 47 laps, a long train formed behind Olivier Panis in fourth, with Ralf Schumacher, Eddie Irvine, and Mika Häkkinen being held up behind him. Ralf Schumacher got past Panis on lap 50, and then Irvine came into the pits, sticking with wet tyres. Häkkinen got a good run out of Adelaide on lap 51 and passed Panis for fifth place into Nurburgring corner. On the same lap, Michael Schumacher suffered an electrical malfunction and lost most of his eight-second lead to Rubens Barrichello. He pitted three laps later, changing his steering wheel in addition to tyres. Mika Häkkinen got past Heinz-Harald Frentzen for second place on lap 57, with Frentzen running wide at Adelaide. Häkkinen passed Barrichello on lap 60 to retake the lead.

Mika Häkkinen and Rubens Barrichello pitted for extra fuel on lap 66, which let Heinz-Harald Frentzen through into the lead. During Frentzen's one and only pit stop to change onto wet tyres, the Jordan team had fortuitously filled his car with enough fuel to finish the race. Ralf Schumacher passed Michael Schumacher on lap 70, with Michael Schumacher appearing to still have car trouble. Frentzen won the race after 72 laps to secure his first victory of the season in a time of 1:58.24.343. Häkkinen held position to finish second, with Barrichello third, 43 seconds behind.

=== Post-race ===
The top three finishers appeared on the podium and in the subsequent press conference. Damon Hill hinted after the race that this one could have been his last, or if he did compete at Silverstone in the next race he might leave Formula One afterwards. Toranosuke Takagi was disqualified for using tyres which had been marked for his team-mate, Pedro de la Rosa.

As a consequence of the race, Häkkinen extended his lead in the World Drivers' Championship to eight points over Schumacher, with Irvine a further 14 behind. In the World Constructors' Championship, McLaren reduced the lead over Ferrari to six points with Williams passing Benetton for fourth position, 43 points behind Ferrari.

== Classification ==
=== Qualifying ===
Pos	No	Driver	Constructor	Lap	Gap	Grid
1	16	(Brazil) Rubens Barrichello	Stewart-Ford	1:38.441		1
2	11	(France) Jean Alesi	Sauber-Petronas	1:38.881	+0.440	2
3	18	(France) Olivier Panis	Prost-Peugeot	1:40.400	+1.959	3
4	2	(United Kingdom) David Coulthard	McLaren-Mercedes	1:40.403	+1.962	4
5	8	(Germany) Heinz-Harald Frentzen	Jordan-Mugen-Honda	1:40.690	+2.249	5
6	3	(Germany) Michael Schumacher	Ferrari	1:41.127	+2.686	6
7	9	(Italy) Giancarlo Fisichella	Benetton-Playlife	1:41.825	+3.384	7
8	19	(Italy) Jarno Trulli	Prost-Peugeot	1:42.096	+3.655	8
9	17	(United Kingdom) Johnny Herbert	Stewart-Ford	1:42.199	+3.758	9
10	23	(Brazil) Ricardo Zonta	BAR-Supertec	1:42.228	+3.787	10
11	12	(Brazil) Pedro Diniz	Sauber-Petronas	1:42.942	+4.501	11
12	22	(Canada) Jacques Villeneuve	BAR-Supertec	1:43.748	+5.307	12
13	10	(Austria) Alexander Wurz	Benetton-Playlife	1:44.319	+5.878	13
14	1	(Finland) Mika Häkkinen	McLaren-Mercedes	1:44.368	+5.927	14
15	5	(Italy) Alessandro Zanardi	Williams-Supertec	1:44.912	+6.471	15
16	6	(Germany) Ralf Schumacher	Williams-Supertec	1:45.189	+6.748	16
17	4	(United Kingdom) Eddie Irvine	Ferrari	1:45.218	+6.777	17
107% time: 1:45.332
18^{1}	7	(United Kingdom) Damon Hill	Jordan-Mugen-Honda	1:45.334	+6.893	18
19^{1}	21	(Spain) Marc Gené	Minardi-Ford	1:46.324	+7.883	22
20^{1}	20	(Italy) Luca Badoer	Minardi-Ford	1:46.784	+8.343	21
21^{1}	14	(Spain) Pedro de la Rosa	Arrows	1:48.215	+9.774	19
22^{1}	15	(Japan) Toranosuke Takagi	Arrows	1:48.322	+9.881	20

Notes

- ^1 – Damon Hill, Marc Gené, Luca Badoer, Pedro de la Rosa and Toranosuke Takagi all failed to set a lap time within the 107% limit, but were allowed to race due to poor weather conditions during qualifying. They were ordered in grid by free practice times, therefore Hill started 18th, de la Rosa 19th, Takagi 20th, Badoer 21st and Gené 22nd.

=== Race ===
Pos	No	Driver	Constructor	Laps	Time/Retired	Grid	Points
1	8	(Germany) Heinz-Harald Frentzen	Jordan-Mugen-Honda	72	1:58:24.343	5	10
2	1	(Finland) Mika Häkkinen	McLaren-Mercedes	72	+11.092	14	6
3	16	(Brazil) Rubens Barrichello	Stewart-Ford	72	+43.432	1	4
4	6	(Germany) Ralf Schumacher	Williams-Supertec	72	+45.475	16	3
5	3	(Germany) Michael Schumacher	Ferrari	72	+47.881	6	2
6	4	(United Kingdom) Eddie Irvine	Ferrari	72	+48.901	17	1
7	19	(Italy) Jarno Trulli	Prost-Peugeot	72	+57.771	8	
8	18	(France) Olivier Panis	Prost-Peugeot	72	+58.531	3	
9	23	(Brazil) Ricardo Zonta	BAR-Supertec	72	+1:28.764	10	
10	20	(Italy) Luca Badoer	Minardi-Ford	71	+1 lap	21	
11	14	(Spain) Pedro de la Rosa	Arrows	71	+1 lap	19	
Ret	9	(Italy) Giancarlo Fisichella	Benetton-Playlife	42	Spun off	7	
Ret	7	(United Kingdom) Damon Hill	Jordan-Mugen-Honda	31	Electrical	18	
Ret	5	(Italy) Alessandro Zanardi	Williams-Supertec	26	Engine	15	
Ret	22	(Canada) Jacques Villeneuve	BAR-Supertec	25	Spun off	12	
Ret	10	(Austria) Alexander Wurz	Benetton-Playlife	25	Spun off	13	
Ret	21	(Spain) Marc Gené	Minardi-Ford	25	Spun off	22	
Ret	11	(France) Jean Alesi	Sauber-Petronas	24	Spun off	2	
Ret	2	(United Kingdom) David Coulthard	McLaren-Mercedes	9	Electrical	4	
Ret	12	(Brazil) Pedro Diniz	Sauber-Petronas	6	Transmission	11	
Ret	17	(United Kingdom) Johnny Herbert	Stewart-Ford	4	Gearbox	9	
DSQ	15	(Japan) Toranosuke Takagi	Arrows	71	Wrong tyres^{2}	20	

Notes

- ^2 – Toranosuke Takagi finished 11th but was disqualified for using tyres which had been marked for his team-mate, Pedro de la Rosa.

== Championship standings after the race ==
Drivers' Championship standings

+/–	Pos	Driver	Points
	1	(Finland) Mika Häkkinen	40
	2	(Germany) Michael Schumacher	32
	3	(United Kingdom) Eddie Irvine	26
	4	(Germany) Heinz-Harald Frentzen	23
2	5	(Germany) Ralf Schumacher	15

Constructors' Championship standings

+/–	Pos	Constructor	Points
	1	(Italy) Ferrari	58
	2	(United Kingdom) McLaren-Mercedes	52
	3	(Republic of Ireland) Jordan-Mugen-Honda	26
1	4	(United Kingdom) Williams-Supertec	15
1	5	(Italy) Benetton-Playlife	14

- Note: Only the top five positions are included for both sets of standings.

Previous race: 1999 Canadian Grand Prix	FIA Formula One World Championship; 1999 season	Next race: 1999 British Grand Prix
Previous race: 1998 French Grand Prix	French Grand Prix	Next race: 2000 French Grand Prix
