= Gislimberti =

Gislimberti is an Italian family name.

The surname may be preceded by de':

- Adriana de' Gislimberti, Italian author
- Davide Gislimberti, Italian ice hockey player
- Paolo Gislimberti, Italian volunteer fireman killed at the 2000 Italian Grand Prix
