= 2000 Hungarian Grand Prix =

12th round of the 2000 Formula One season

Coordinates: 47°34′44″N 19°14′55″E

Race 12 of 17 in the 2000 Formula One World Championship
← Previous race	Next race →
- Hungaroring (pre-2002 circuit)

Race details
- Date: 13 August 2000
- Official name: XVI Marlboro Magyar Nagydíj
- Location: Hungaroring, Mogyoród, Pest, Hungary
- Course: Permanent racing facility
- Course length: 3.975 km (2.470 miles)
- Distance: 77 laps, 306.075 km (190.186 miles)
- Weather: Partially cloudy, very hot, dry

Pole position
Driver	(Germany) Michael Schumacher	Ferrari
- Time: 1:17.514

Fastest lap
Driver	(Finland) Mika Häkkinen	McLaren-Mercedes
- Time: 1:20.028 on lap 33

Podium
First	(Finland) Mika Häkkinen	McLaren-Mercedes
Second	(Germany) Michael Schumacher	Ferrari
Third	(United Kingdom) David Coulthard	McLaren-Mercedes

The 2000 Hungarian Grand Prix (formally the XVI Marlboro Magyar Nagydj) was a Formula One motor race held on 13 August 2000, at the Hungaroring in Mogyoród, Pest, Hungary, attended by 120,000 spectators. The race was the twelfth of seventeen in the 2000 Formula One World Championship and the 18th in Hungary. Mika Häkkinen, driving a McLaren-Mercedes, won the 77-lap race after starting third. Ferrari's Michael Schumacher finished second after qualifying on pole position in the one-hour qualifying session the day before the race. Häkkinen's teammate David Coulthard finished third.

Before the race, Michael Schumacher led the World Drivers' Championship from Häkkinen, while Ferrari led the World Constructors' Championship from McLaren. Häkkinen overtook Schumacher and Coulthard at the start and led every lap save the first round of pit stops. He won by eight seconds, with Schumacher holding off Coulthard for second. The win, Häkkinen's third of the season and his 17th in Formula One, moved him to the World Drivers' Championship lead for the first time in 2000, two championship points ahead of Schumacher and six championship points ahead of Coulthard, while McLaren took the World Constructors' Championship lead from Ferrari by one championship point with five of the season's races remaining.

== Background ==
On 13 August 2000, the 3.975 km (2.470 mi) clockwise Hungaroring in Mogyoród, Pest, Hungary hosted the 12th race of the 2000 Formula One World Championship, the 2000 Hungarian Grand Prix. Sole tyre supplier Bridgestone delivered the Soft and Extra Soft dry compound tyres to the event, the softest compounds available to teams. Entering the race, Ferrari's Michael Schumacher led the World Drivers' Championship with 56 championship points, ahead of McLaren teammates Mika Häkkinen and David Coulthard, who were tied for second on 54 championship points. Ferrari's Rubens Barrichello was fourth with 46 championship points, while Benetton's Giancarlo Fisichella was fifth with 18 championship points. Ferrari led the World Constructors' Championship with 102 championship points, four more than second-placed McLaren. Williams was third with 22 championship points, with Benetton fourth with 18 championship points. British American Racing (BAR) were fifth with 12 championship points.

Following the German Grand Prix on 30 July, teams prepared for the event by testing on circuits similar to the Hungaroring. Six teams tested high-downforce, racing setups at the Circuit Ricardo Tormo for three days. McLaren test driver Olivier Panis finished the first day ahead of Häkkinen. Pedro Diniz's Sauber car had an oil leak, restricting his team's testing time while the leak was rectified. Coulthard was fastest on the second day and Fisichella led on the final day. Benetton's Alexander Wurz spun and struck the tyre barrier. His car's wishbone hit his right leg, and he was taken to the circuit's medical centre before being transferred to a local hospital. Wurz was passed fit to compete in the race the day after his accident. Ferrari tested for five days at the Fiorano Circuit, focusing on car development, practice starts, aerodynamic testing and race distance simulations with test driver Luca Badoer. He was joined by Barrichello on the second day and Michael Schumacher from the fourth day onwards. Badoer and Michael Schumacher spent two more days at the circuit shaking down the Ferrari F1-2000 car.

After three consecutive retirements, including first-lap collisions in Austria and Germany reducing his points lead from 22 points to 2, Michael Schumacher stated that his objective in Hungary was to avoid any incident on the first lap and finish in a points-scoring position. He was also confident that Ferrari would perform well on the track. Despite Ferrari president Luca di Montezemolo's comments to the press about Barrichello assisting Michael Schumacher's title aspirations, Barrichello revealed that he received backing from him to challenge for more victories and the championship.

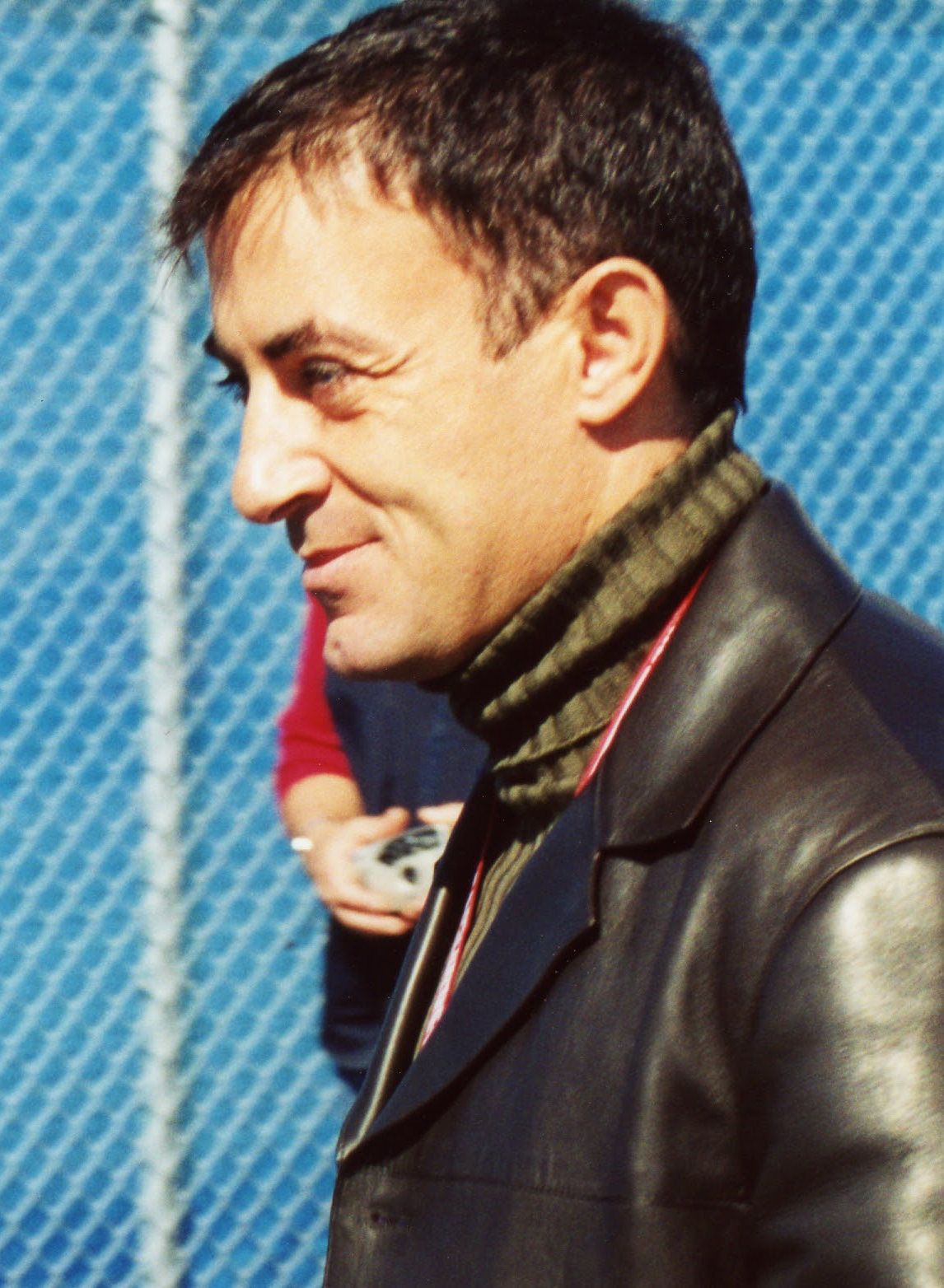
Jean Alesi (pictured in 2001) was passed fit to participate in the Grand Prix after a heavy accident at the preceding German Grand Prix.

The event featured eleven teams (each representing a different constructor) and two drivers, with no changes from the season entry list. Following tests, Prost's Jean Alesi was declared fit by his doctors and then by FIA medical delegate Sid Watkins in the days before the race. At the previous race, Alesi was involved in a high-speed accident with Sauber driver Diniz, suffering from abdominal pains, dizziness and vomiting. Prost had their test driver Stéphane Sarrazin ready if Alesi relapsed. Alesi said he felt ready to race again: "It took a few days before I really started to recover, but now I sleep and feel much better".

Some teams modified their cars for the event. The Hungaroring track's characteristics require teams to operate their car with a high load of aerodynamics, and special attention was paid to heat dissipation because high temperatures were recorded at the circuit. McLaren improved the aerodynamics of their MP4/15 chassis in order to increase the amount of downforce, and thus grip, produced by the bodywork. They also brought revised nose wings. McLaren additionally strengthened the steel rear suspension wishbones. BAR outfitted their cars with one-off components designed to improve the performance of the monocoque's cooling systems. Ferrari debuted an aerodynamic setup similar to that used at the Monaco Grand Prix, as well as a modified version of the F1-2000's chimneys. Minardi arrived with redesigned radiator intakes and exits to address temperature issues with their Fondmetal V10 engines.

== Practice ==
Before Sunday's race, there were two one-hour sessions on Friday and two 45-minute sessions on Saturday. The Friday practice sessions took place in dry, hot weather; when clouds obscured the track, the temperature dropped, but the ambient temperature remained constant. Before any lap times were set nearly 20 minutes, 15 drivers completed out-laps to allow them to perform system checks. The track was dirty due to a lack of activity for several months, and race organisers were unable to completely clean it.

Michael Schumacher waited for other drivers to clean the dirty track before setting the first session's quickest time on his first fast lap, at 1 minute and 20.198 seconds, in the final moments of the session. He was almost six-tenths of a second faster than teammate Barrichello. Jaguar's Eddie Irvine was third fastest, ahead of Williams' Ralf Schumacher. Fisichella, BAR's Jacques Villeneuve, Jordan's Jarno Trulli, Diniz, Mika Salo of Sauber and Williams' Jenson Button completed the top ten. McLaren sat out first practice, preferring to save tyres. Several teams concentrated on testing the high downforce aerodynamic packages fitted to their cars during the session.

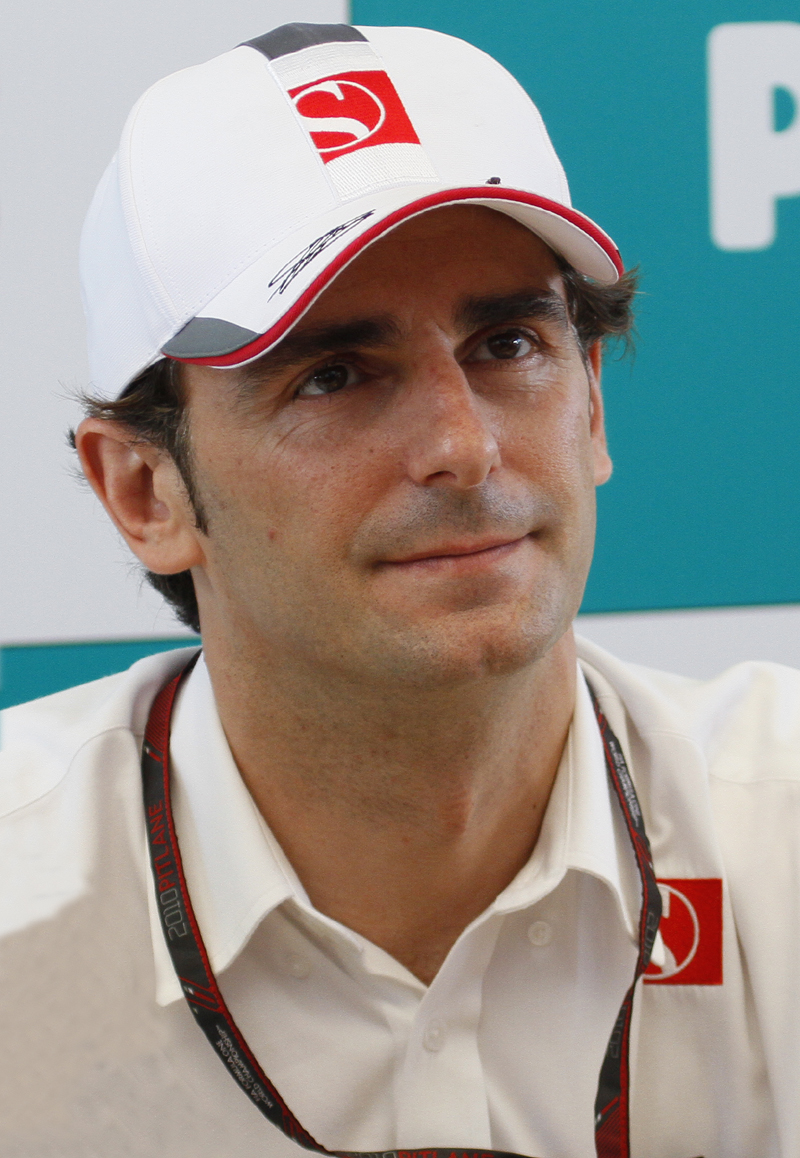
Pedro de la Rosa (pictured in 2010) crashed in the second free practice session

Coulthard set the day's fastest lap of 1:18.792 with about 15 minutes left in the second practice session; the time was half a second slower than teammate Häkkinen's pole lap at the 1999 race. Häkkinen was second, Michael Schumacher third and Barrichello fourth. Trulli was faster, finishing fifth fastest, ahead of Fisichella and Williams drivers Ralf Schumacher and Button. Jordan's Heinz-Harald Frentzen and Irvine completed the top ten. Several drivers lost control of their cars during the session due to the low grip racing surface appearing to be problematic for racers. Arrows' Pedro de la Rosa was unhurt in an accident against the tyre wall.

The weather remained dry, hot and sunny for the two Saturday practice sessions, with no indication of rain when the third session began. With three minutes remaining in the third practice session, Barrichello set a time of 1:18.268. Coulthard was second, a thousandth of a second slower than Barrichello. Frentzen was third, ahead of Michael Schumacher in fourth and Häkkinen and Ralf Schumacher in fifth and sixth, respectively. Salo, Button, Trulli, and Fisichella completed the top ten. Three minutes in, De la Rosa almost lost control of his car at the final corner and Gastón Mazzacane's Minardi engine failed due to a differential fault.

The final practice session took place on a marginally drier but still dusty circuit than the previous session. Teams were finalising car setups and scrubbing tyres. Michael Schumacher was quicker than the day before, lapping 1:17.395 with 20 minutes of the season remaining. He was 0.630 seconds faster than second-placed Coulthard with Barrichello in the second Ferrari third. Frentzen, Ralf Schumacher, Häkkinen, Trulli, Fisichella, Salo and Diniz followed in positions four to ten. Diniz was briefly stuck at the pit lane entry as his engine stalled in first gear.

== Qualifying ==
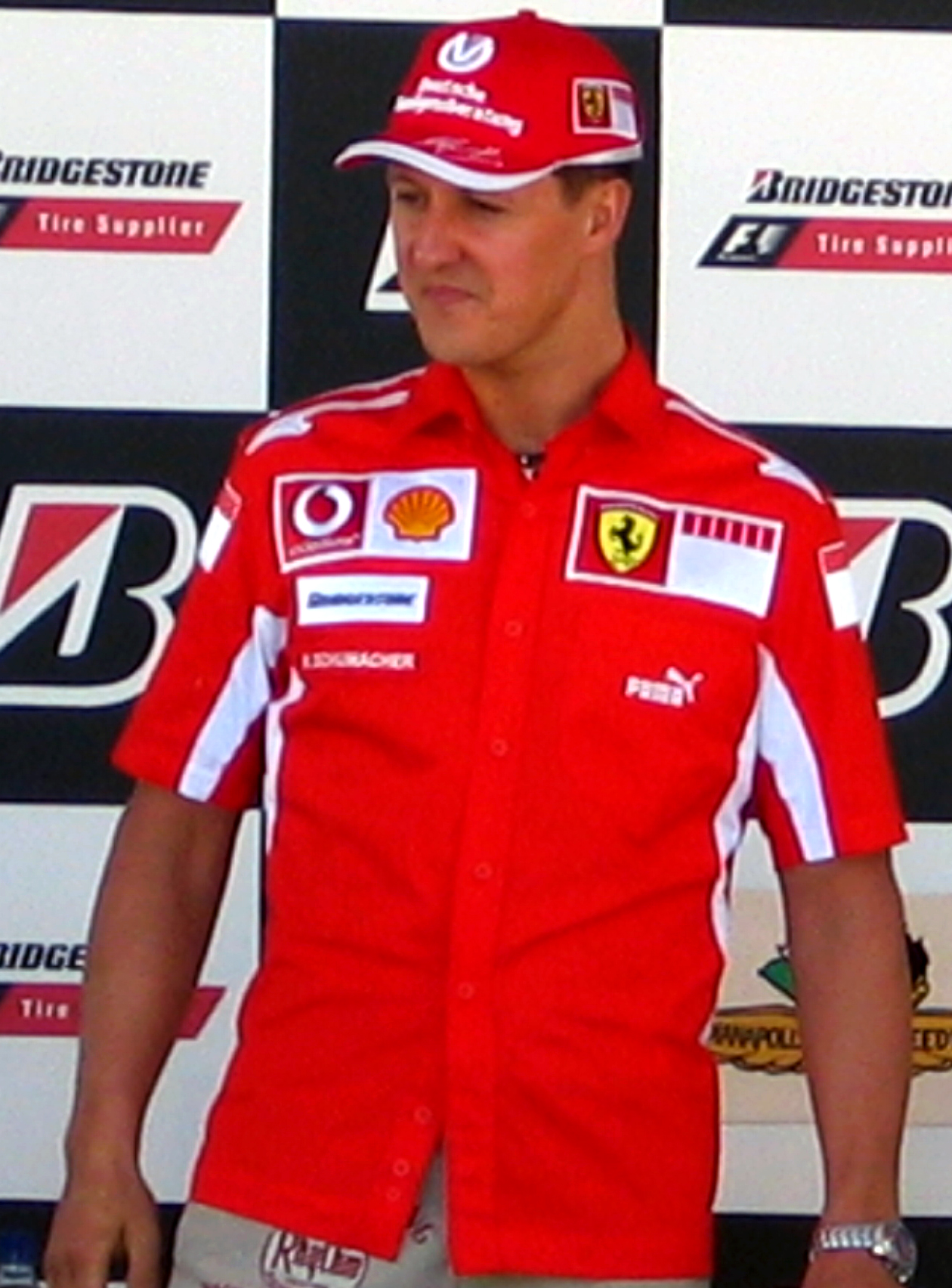
Michael Schumacher took his fifth pole position of the 2000 season.

During Saturday's one-hour qualifying session, each driver was limited to twelve laps, with the starting order determined by their fastest laps. The 107% rule was in force during this session, which required each driver to set a time within 107% of the fastest lap to qualify for the race. The session took place in dry, hot and clear weather, similar to practice, but with a warmer track temperature. The warm weather made the track more slippery. Most of the faster teams used new rear tyres and front scrubbed compounds to reduce understeer when lapping quickly. Michael Schumacher qualified on pole position for the 28th time in his career, and fifth of the season, with a lap of 1:17.514, on his first fast lap midway through qualifying. Coulthard, who was 0.372 seconds slower on his third and final run, joined Michael Schumacher on the grid's front row. McLaren did not optimise Coulthard's vehicle for low fuel, and it oversteered in the circuit's first two sectors. Häkkinen, third, made considerable car setup changes by altering the rear anti-roll bar and front torsion beams, which he tested early in qualifying to see if it improved his performance. Ralf Schumacher qualified fourth with the newer Williams qualifying engine, his season-best qualifying result. He was satisfied with revisions to his car's aerodynamics. Barrichello, fifth, had car handling difficulties and said Coulthard prevented him from lapping faster. Frentzen, sixth, had excess oversteer in the track's final two sectors.

Fisichella qualified seventh, claiming Michael Schumacher hindered his final lap. Ferrari attempted to inform Schumacher about Fisichella behind him but Ferrari technical director Ross Brawn pressed the wrong radio button and mistakenly told Barrichello. Brawn apologised for the error and Benetton technical director Pat Symonds downplayed it. Button was the slower of the two Williams drivers in eighth. Salo finished ninth, owing to cloud cover on his final run. Irvine finished tenth. Wurz, 11th, failed to reach the top-ten by two-tenths of a second after switching to his teammate Fisichella's setup. Trulli qualified 12th after experiencing oversteer that could not be corrected by car component and setup tweaks. He was ahead of Diniz in 13th, who was hindered by traffic and had car setup problems. Alesi was the faster of the two Prost drivers in 14th. De la Rosa took 15th on the soft compound tyre and was the highest qualifying Arrows driver. Villeneuve finished 16th when his BAR chassis failed to generate enough downforce. Johnny Herbert, 17th for Jaguar, spun late in qualifying and had excess oversteer. He was followed in 18th by Zonta, who lacked downforce. For his fourth run, Nick Heidfeld switched to the spare Prost AP03 car and reported excessive oversteer en route to qualifying 19th. Jos Verstappen, 20th, struggled to adapt to the high-downforce track with his Arrows car. The Minardi drivers qualified 21st and 22nd in their underpowered cars; Marc Gené outqualified teammate Mazzacane by two-tenths of a second after the latter went wide onto the grass during his fastest lap, losing nearly half a second.

=== Qualifying classification ===
Pos	No	Driver	Constructor	Lap	Gap
1	3	(Germany) Michael Schumacher	Ferrari	1:17.514	—
2	2	(United Kingdom) David Coulthard	McLaren-Mercedes	1:17.886	+0.372
3	1	(Finland) Mika Häkkinen	McLaren-Mercedes	1:17.922	+0.408
4	9	(Germany) Ralf Schumacher	Williams-BMW	1:18.321	+0.807
5	4	(Brazil) Rubens Barrichello	Ferrari	1:18.330	+0.816
6	5	(Germany) Heinz-Harald Frentzen	Jordan-Mugen-Honda	1:18.523	+1.009
7	11	(Italy) Giancarlo Fisichella	Benetton-Playlife	1:18.607	+1.093
8	10	(United Kingdom) Jenson Button	Williams-BMW	1:18.699	+1.185
9	17	(Finland) Mika Salo	Sauber-Petronas	1:18.748	+1.234
10	7	(United Kingdom) Eddie Irvine	Jaguar-Cosworth	1:19.008	+1.494
11	12	(Austria) Alexander Wurz	Benetton-Playlife	1:19.259	+1.745
12	6	(Italy) Jarno Trulli	Jordan-Mugen-Honda	1:19.266	+1.752
13	16	(Brazil) Pedro Diniz	Sauber-Petronas	1:19.451	+1.937
14	14	(France) Jean Alesi	Prost-Peugeot	1:19.626	+2.112
15	18	(Spain) Pedro de la Rosa	Arrows-Supertec	1:19.897	+2.383
16	22	(Canada) Jacques Villeneuve	BAR-Honda	1:19.937	+2.423
17	8	(United Kingdom) Johnny Herbert	Jaguar-Cosworth	1:19.956	+2.442
18	23	(Brazil) Ricardo Zonta	BAR-Honda	1:20.272	+2.758
19	15	(Germany) Nick Heidfeld	Prost-Peugeot	1:20.481	+2.967
20	19	(Netherlands) Jos Verstappen	Arrows-Supertec	1:20.609	+3.095
21	20	(Spain) Marc Gené	Minardi-Fondmetal	1:20.654	+3.140
22	21	(Argentina) Gastón Mazzacane	Minardi-Fondmetal	1:20.905	+3.391
107% time: 1:22.940

== Warm-up ==
The drivers took to the track in hot, sunny weather at 09:30 Central European Summer Time (UTC+2) for a 30-minute warm-up session. Rainfall the night before had cleaned the circuit. Teams used the session to adjust and check their race and spare cars before the race. With ten minutes remaining, Coulthard set the pace with a lap time of 1:19.261. Michael Schumacher outpaced teammate Barrichello and behind Coulthard by 0.120 seconds in the second and third-placed Ferraris. Ralf Schumacher's Williams finished fourth. Due to traffic on his best lap, Häkkinen set the fifth-fastest time, 1.2 seconds behind teammate Coulthard. Frentzen completed the top six drivers. To clean his starting spot on the track's right-hand side, Coulthard completed one installation lap in the spare McLaren on the start-finish straight. An engine failure caused Irvine to enter the pit lane with smoke billowing from his car.

== Race ==
The 77-lap race was held over 306.075 km (190.186 mi) began at 14:00 local time before 120,000 spectators, (with 30,000 from Finland). The event saw hot and partially cloudy weather; the air temperature was 32 °C (90 °F) and the track temperature ranged between 34 and 44 °C (93 and 111 °F); conditions were expected to remain consistent throughout the race. It was warmer than the morning warm-up session, and drivers needed to drink a lot of water to cope up with the physical demands of cockpit temperatures and the circuit. Except for De la Rosa, all drivers began on the extra soft tyre compounds. Mazzacane suffered a gearbox issue and had to start in his spare car while the grid was assembling. Herbert also intended to drive his backup car because his regular car suffered a leak that was repaired before the start. When the race began, Coulthard made a slow poor start on the dirty inner part of the start-finish straight. His teammate Häkkinen had more momentum than Michael Schumacher and turned right to pass him on the inside for the lead at the 180-degree first corner while near the right-hand side kerb. Michael Schumacher slowed to avoid colliding with Häkkinen and avoided retiring from the opening lap for the third successive race.

Ralf Schumacher's attempts to pass Coulthard for third on the inside the opening two turns were unsuccessful. Villeneuve and De la Rosa collided into the chicane and both cars (which lacked mechanical grip) sustained damage. Villeneuve made a pit stop for a new front wing assembly followed by De la Rosa for a new set of tyres since he sustained a left rear puncture. At the first lap's conclusion, Häkkinen led from Michael Schumacher, Coulthard, Ralf Schumacher, Barrichello, and Frentzen. Michael Schumacher was close behind Häkkinen but not close enough to overtake him for the lead. Häkkinen began to pull away gradually from Michael Schumacher, increasing his lead to 3.5 seconds by the eighth lap. Fisichella in seventh had poor brake balance and slid wide onto the grass at the first corner on lap eight due to a lack of grip. In order to prevent a collision, Button slowed slightly. Irvine used this incident to pass Button for seventh position on the short straight into the second corner. Fisichella fell to 14th place. On lap 12, Fisichella ran wide into a gravel trap and was passed by Herbert for 13th. Fisichella took his first pit stop for brake repairs three laps later and rejoined the track in 19th. On that lap, Alesi became the race's first retirement after a series of pit stops by mechanics failed to repair a broken left-rear suspension that had been exacerbated by a change in wheel alignment.

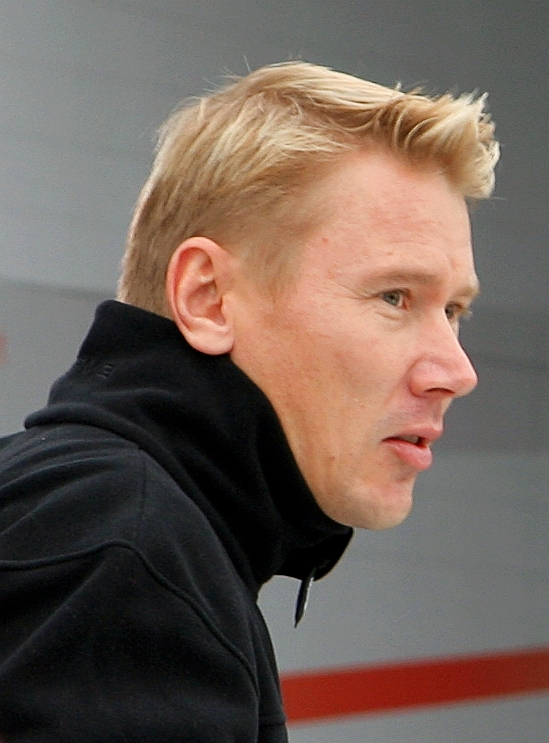
Mika Häkkinen won the race from third position after passing Michael Schumacher and McLaren teammate David Coulthard.

Häkkinen had a seven-second lead over Michael Schumacher by lap 19. Coulthard was three seconds behind Michael Schumacher owing to an incorrect tyre pressure setting and was pulling away from Ralf Schumacher. Heidfeld became the race's second retirement when his car failed due to a drop in battery voltage after a pit stop following his completing 22 laps. Three laps later, Irvine made his first pit stop from seventh and fell to 11th. At the end of lap 27, Brawn asked Michael Schumacher to enter the pit lane for the first of two scheduled stops, which lasted 7.3 seconds. He rejoined the track in fifth, behind his teammate Barrichello. On the 29th lap, Barrichello relinquished third to teammate Michael Schumacher at the first corner. Barrichello entered the pit lane on the 30th lap and completed the stop in 6.7 seconds. He returned to the circuit in sixth, ahead of Ralf Schumacher, whose own pit stop was hampered by a jammed wheel nut.

Race leader Häkkinen, whose drink bottle failed roughly a third of the way into the race and he became exhausted, made a seven-second pit stop on lap 31 for a new set of tyres, falling behind teammate Coulthard. Häkkinen reclaimed the race lead after Coulthard's 6.9-second pit stop for fuel and tyres on the following lap. Coulthard returned to the track in third, behind Michael Schumacher but ahead of Schumacher's teammate Barrichello. Häkkinen set the race's fastest lap, a 1:20.028 on lap 33, as he continued to pull away from Michael Schumacher. Fisichella retired on the 36th lap as his car became difficult to drive owing to bargeboard damage. Coulthard on a new set of tyres, lapped faster and was two seconds behind Michael Schumacher by lap 37 as Schumacher's cautious pace preserved his tyres since they wore quickly on the Ferrari. However, aerodynamic turbulence impeded progress.

When Coulthard was delayed by Genè on lap 47 and lost more than a second, Michael Schumacher increased the gap. Genè would receive a 10-second stop-go penalty for delaying Irvine's Jaguar. As he had been short-fuelled, Barrichello made his second pit stop on lap 48, lasting 8.7 seconds. Michael Schumacher and Ralf Schumacher made their pit stops on lap 51. Michael Schumacher was brought into the pit lane since slower cars were likely to impede Coulthard. On the following lap, Coulthard replied by making his second pit stop, which lasted 6.6 seconds, and rejoined the circuit in third place, close behind Michael Schumacher. Häkkinen completed his final pit stop on the 53rd lap, having built a 21-second lead over Michael Schumacher. Frentzen became the last driver to make a scheduled pit stop on lap 56. The top six in the running order at the end of lap 57, with all scheduled pit stops completed, were Häkkinen, Michael Schumacher, Coulthard, Barrichello, Ralf Schumacher, and Frentzen. Herbert spun while battling Villeneuve for 13th position.

On lap 65, Diniz's car stopped between turns nine and ten due to engine failure. Herbert dropped behind Verstappen on lap 70 after spinning in front of him at the first corner. He retired two laps later with gearbox problems. Mazzacane retired on track on lap 73 with an engine failure after a visor became caught inside a radiator, causing water temperatures to rise too high. Trulli caught and passed Button for seventh on the first corner on lap 75. Button lost eighth to Irvine a lap later. A cracked engine exhaust or a throttle control issue slowing Button in the last laps, giving him less available horsepower. Häkkinen slowed his pace to lap within the 1:24 minute range, finishing first for his third victory of the season and 17th of his career in a time of 1'45:33.869, at an average speed of 173.964 km/h (108.096 mph). Michael Schumacher finished second 7.9 seconds behind, his first points score in four rounds, ahead of Coulthard in third. In the hot weather, Barrichello lost 1.5 kg (3.3 lb) of weight and 3 L (0.66 imp gal; 0.79 US gal) of fluids after running out of water by the 40th lap. Ralf Schumacher took fifth and Frentzen completed the points scorers in sixth. Trulli, Irvine, Button, Salo, and Wurz finished one lap behind the winner. The final classified finishers Villeneuve, Verstappen, Zonta, Gené, and De la Rosa. There were six retirements during the event.

=== Post-race ===
The top three drivers appeared on the podium to collect their trophies and in the subsequent press conference. Häkkinen said that modifications to his car's engine caused his good start. Norbert Haug, Vice President of Mercedes-Benz Motorsport, complimented his victory. "Mika had a great race," he said. "His victory may have looked easy, but it was tough to achieve and in my view this was one of his best drives ever." Although he was unable to catch Häkkinen, Michael Schumacher expressed satisfaction with finishing second. He admitted to being too cautious at the start because he lost momentum and said Häkkinen would have overtaken him during the pit stops had he not done so at the start. Coulthard believed his car had balance issues prior to his first pit stop, which accounted for his lack of place. He also said that time spent behind backmarkers during the second stint hampered his attempts to overtake Michael Schumacher, but that third was the best possible result he could have achieved.

Following Ferrari's previous race victory, Brawn stated, "Our pitstops and our race strategy went well, but we just weren't quick enough.", while Di Montezemolo urged Ferrari's mechanics and engineers to focus on resolving the issue of wheel-spin and praised Häkkinen for his recent trend of good starts. Barrichello blamed his fourth-place finish on a poor qualifying performance. Ralf Schumacher and Frentzen were pleased to finish fifth and sixth, respectively. Fisichella, who retired with a brake problem, stated that the recurring issue damaged his car and forced his retirement. Gené blamed his stop-go penalty on faulty radio communication with his team, saying that he was not shown the blue flag until the last moment. Gary Anderson, Jaguar's technical director, was furious with Gené after the race, believing the Spaniard's driving cost Irvine the chance to score points. "I don't understand why the blue flags weren't waved because it was plain for all to see." said Anderson.

As a result of the race result, Häkkinen's victory saw him claim the lead in the World Drivers' Championship for the first time in the season, with 64 points, putting Michael Schumacher two points behind him. Coulthard was third with 58 points, nine points ahead of fourth-placed Barrichello and 40 points ahead of fifth-placed Fisichella. McLaren became the new leaders of the World Constructors' Championship with 112 points, demoting Ferrari to second on 111 points. Williams in third were now six points ahead of Benetton in fourth. With Jordan's one point scored by Frentzen finishing sixth, the team passed BAR for fifth with 12 points. Despite McLaren taking the lead in both championships, team principal Ron Dennis acknowledged he expected both drivers to have the advantage in most of the five remaining races but that complacency would limit his team's chances of success.

=== Race classification ===
Drivers who scored championship points are denoted in bold.

Pos	No	Driver	Constructor	Laps	Time/Retired	Grid	Points
1	1	(Finland) **Mika Häkkinen**	**McLaren-Mercedes**	77	1:45:33.869	3	10
2	3	(Germany) **Michael Schumacher**	**Ferrari**	77	+ 7.917	1	6
3	2	(United Kingdom) **David Coulthard**	**McLaren-Mercedes**	77	+ 8.455	2	4
4	4	(Brazil) **Rubens Barrichello**	**Ferrari**	77	+ 44.157	5	3
5	9	(Germany) **Ralf Schumacher**	**Williams-BMW**	77	+ 50.437	4	2
6	5	(Germany) **Heinz-Harald Frentzen**	**Jordan-Mugen-Honda**	77	+ 1:08.099	6	1
7	6	(Italy) Jarno Trulli	Jordan-Mugen-Honda	76	+ 1 Lap	12	
8	7	(United Kingdom) Eddie Irvine	Jaguar-Cosworth	76	+ 1 Lap	10	
9	10	(United Kingdom) Jenson Button	Williams-BMW	76	+ 1 Lap	8	
10	17	(Finland) Mika Salo	Sauber-Petronas	76	+ 1 Lap	9	
11	12	(Austria) Alexander Wurz	Benetton-Playlife	76	+ 1 Lap	11	
12	22	(Canada) Jacques Villeneuve	BAR-Honda	75	+ 2 Laps	16	
13	19	(Netherlands) Jos Verstappen	Arrows-Supertec	75	+ 2 Laps	20	
14	23	(Brazil) Ricardo Zonta	BAR-Honda	75	+ 2 Laps	18	
15	20	(Spain) Marc Gené	Minardi-Fondmetal	74	+ 3 Laps	21	
16	18	(Spain) Pedro de la Rosa	Arrows-Supertec	73	+ 4 Laps	15	
Ret	21	(Argentina) Gastón Mazzacane	Minardi-Fondmetal	68	Engine	22	
Ret	8	(United Kingdom) Johnny Herbert	Jaguar-Cosworth	67	Gearbox	17	
Ret	16	(Brazil) Pedro Diniz	Sauber-Petronas	62	Transmission/Engine	13	
Ret	11	(Italy) Giancarlo Fisichella	Benetton-Playlife	31	Brakes	7	
Ret	15	(Germany) Nick Heidfeld	Prost-Peugeot	22	Electrical	19	
Ret	14	(France) Jean Alesi	Prost-Peugeot	11	Suspension	14	

== Championship standings after the race ==
Drivers' Championship standings

+/–	Pos	Driver	Points
1	1	(Finland) Mika Häkkinen*	64
1	2	(Germany) Michael Schumacher*	62
	3	(United Kingdom) David Coulthard*	58
	4	(Brazil) Rubens Barrichello*	49
	5	(Italy) Giancarlo Fisichella*	18

Constructors' Championship standings

+/–	Pos	Constructor	Points
1	1	(United Kingdom) McLaren-Mercedes*	112
1	2	(Italy) Ferrari*	111
	3	(United Kingdom) Williams-BMW	24
	4	(Italy) Benetton-Playlife	18
1	5	(Republic of Ireland) Jordan-Mugen-Honda	12
Sources:

- Note: Only the top five positions are included for both sets of standings.
- Bold text and an asterisk indicates competitors who still had a theoretical chance of becoming World Champion.

Previous race: 2000 German Grand Prix	FIA Formula One World Championship; 2000 season	Next race: 2000 Belgian Grand Prix
Previous race: 1999 Hungarian Grand Prix	Hungarian Grand Prix	Next race: 2001 Hungarian Grand Prix
