= 2000 Belgian Grand Prix =

2000 Formula One motor race in Belgium

Coordinates: 50°26′14″N 5°58′17″E

Race 13 of 17 in the 2000 Formula One World Championship
← Previous race	Next race →
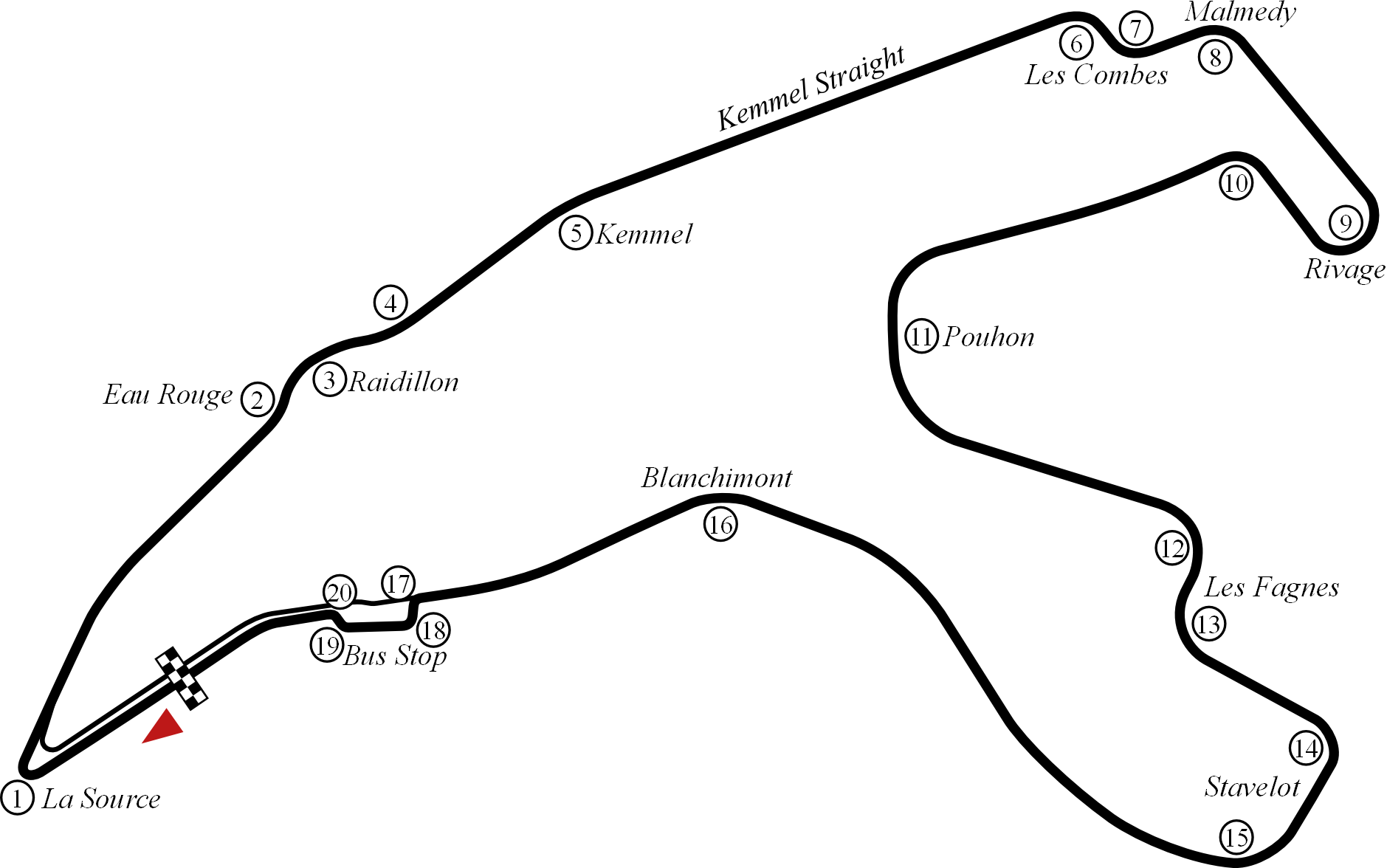
- Spa Francorchamps

Race details
- Date: 27 August 2000
- Official name: LVIII Foster's Belgian Grand Prix
- Location: Circuit de Spa-Francorchamps, Francorchamps, Wallonia, Belgium
- Course: Permanent racing facility
- Course length: 6.968 km (4.330 miles)
- Distance: 44 laps, 306.592 km (190.507 miles)
- Weather: Wet at start, drying, Air & track temperature; 15 °C (59 °F)

Pole position
Driver	(Finland) Mika Häkkinen	McLaren-Mercedes
- Time: 1:50.646

Fastest lap
Driver	(Brazil) Rubens Barrichello	Ferrari
- Time: 1:53.803 on lap 30

Podium
First	(Finland) Mika Häkkinen	McLaren-Mercedes
Second	(Germany) Michael Schumacher	Ferrari
Third	(Germany) Ralf Schumacher	Williams-BMW

The 2000 Belgian Grand Prix (formally, the LVIII Foster's Belgian Grand Prix) was a Formula One motor race held on 27 August 2000 at the Circuit de Spa-Francorchamps, Francorchamps, Wallonia, Belgium with a crowd of 83,000 spectators. It was the 13th race of the 2000 Formula One World Championship, and the 58th Belgian Grand Prix. McLaren driver Mika Häkkinen won the 44-lap race from pole position - his last in Formula One. Michael Schumacher finished second in a Ferrari, and Williams driver Ralf Schumacher was third.

Häkkinen went into the event as the World Drivers' Championship leader with his team McLaren leading the World Constructors' Championship. The race began behind the safety car due to overnight rainfall making the track wet and reducing visibility. When the safety car returned to the pit lane after one lap Häkkinen built a significant lead over Jarno Trulli. As the track dried and other drivers made pit stops, Häkkinen maintained his lead until a lap-13 spin gave Michael Schumacher the lead for most of the remainder of the race. By the 34th lap Schumacher's tyres began to degrade; he drove off the racing line to cool them, which allowed Häkkinen to close the gap. On lap 41 Häkkinen overtook Michael Schumacher for the lead while lapping BAR driver Ricardo Zonta and maintaining the lead to win. Although Rubens Barrichello set the fastest lap time in the other Ferrari, he was hampered by a poor qualifying performance and retired with a fuel-pressure problem thirteen laps from the finish.

Häkkinen's victory extended his lead in the World Drivers' Championship to six championship points over Michael Schumacher, with Coulthard a further seven championship points behind. Barrichello's retirement from the Grand Prix dropped him to 25 championship points behind Häkkinen. In the World Constructors' Championship, McLaren extended their lead to eight championship points over Ferrari with four races remaining in the season.

== Background ==
The 2000 Belgian Grand Prix was the 13th of 17 races in the 2000 Formula One World Championship and took place at the 6.968 km (4.330 mi) Circuit de Spa-Francorchamps in Francorchamps, Wallonia, Belgium on 27 August 2000. Sole tyre supplier Bridgestone brought the soft and medium dry compounds as well as the hard and soft wet-weather compounds to the event; the intermediate had a curvy pattern and the full wet was designed for the track's common rainy conditions. The wet-weather tyres were introduced for the race in response to prospective new tyre supplier Michelin beginning their tyre-development program during the year, resulting in Bridgestone increasing their development rate to research advances.

Following his victory at the Hungarian Grand Prix, McLaren driver Mika Häkkinen led the World Drivers' Championship with 64 championship points, ahead of Ferrari's Michael Schumacher (62 championship points) and McLaren's David Coulthard (58). Schumacher's teammate Rubens Barrichello was fourth with 49 championship points, and Benetton's Giancarlo Fisichella was fifth with 18. McLaren led the World Constructors' Championship with 112 championship points, one championship point ahead of second-placed Ferrari. Williams were third with 24 championship points, while Benetton (18 championship points) and Jordan (12) were fourth and fifth respectively.

The primary talking point of the weekend was the situation at Ferrari. Michael Schumacher had retired from three of the four preceding races and finished second behind Häkkinen in the one race he did finish, meaning his lead of 22 championship points had been reduced to a two-point deficit to Häkkinen. Also, Coulthard in the other McLaren had won three races and was four championship points behind Michael Schumacher.

After the race in Hungary, five teams conducted mid-season testing at the Silverstone Circuit in England from 15 to 17 August to prepare for the Belgian Grand Prix. McLaren test driver Olivier Panis was fastest on the first day, ahead of Jordan's Heinz-Harald Frentzen. Williams test driver Bruno Junqueira's car had a water leak, resulting in repairs which limited his team's testing time. Panis remained the fastest on the second day. Jos Verstappen's Arrows car had a sensor failure, limiting his team's testing time; the car's floor had to be removed to install a new sensor. Panis was again fastest on the final day of testing. Ferrari opted to test the suspension and tyres of Michael Schumacher's car at the Fiorano Circuit. Schumacher later moved to the Mugello Circuit, with Barrichello conducting engine and setup tests, and Ferrari test driver Luca Badoer remained at Fiorano for development work on new car components. Prost opted to test at the Autodromo Nazionale Monza on 17–18 August with driver Jean Alesi. Benetton conducted a five-day, one-car test at the Danielson Circuit, with test driver Mark Webber on aerodynamic development for the first four days and Alexander Wurz concentrating on practice starts the last day.

In September 1999 the Fédération Internationale de l'Automobile (FIA) released a provisional calendar for the 2000 season, dropping the Circuit de Spa-Francorchamps from the Formula One World Championship due to Belgian tobacco-advertising laws which threatened to cancel the race; several teams had tobacco sponsorship. The FIA had the revived Dutch Grand Prix at the Circuit Zandvoort and the Portuguese Grand Prix at the Circuito do Estoril as alternatives if the Belgian Grand Prix was cancelled. The dispute was resolved when the Belgian government exempted the race from the advertising law, and it was reinstated at the FIA World Motor Sport Council meeting in Paris on 6 October.

The event featured eleven teams (each represented by a different constructor) and two drivers, with no changes from the season entry list. Ferrari arrived at the circuit with a lighter, more-powerful version of its Tipo 049 V10 engine for Saturday's qualifying session, returning to the development power plant used at the Hungarian Grand Prix. They also had a bespoke revised low downforce aerodynamic package for the high-speed circuit. Williams brought new exhausts and an extractor profile, while the other teams only introduced minor car refinements.

== Practice ==
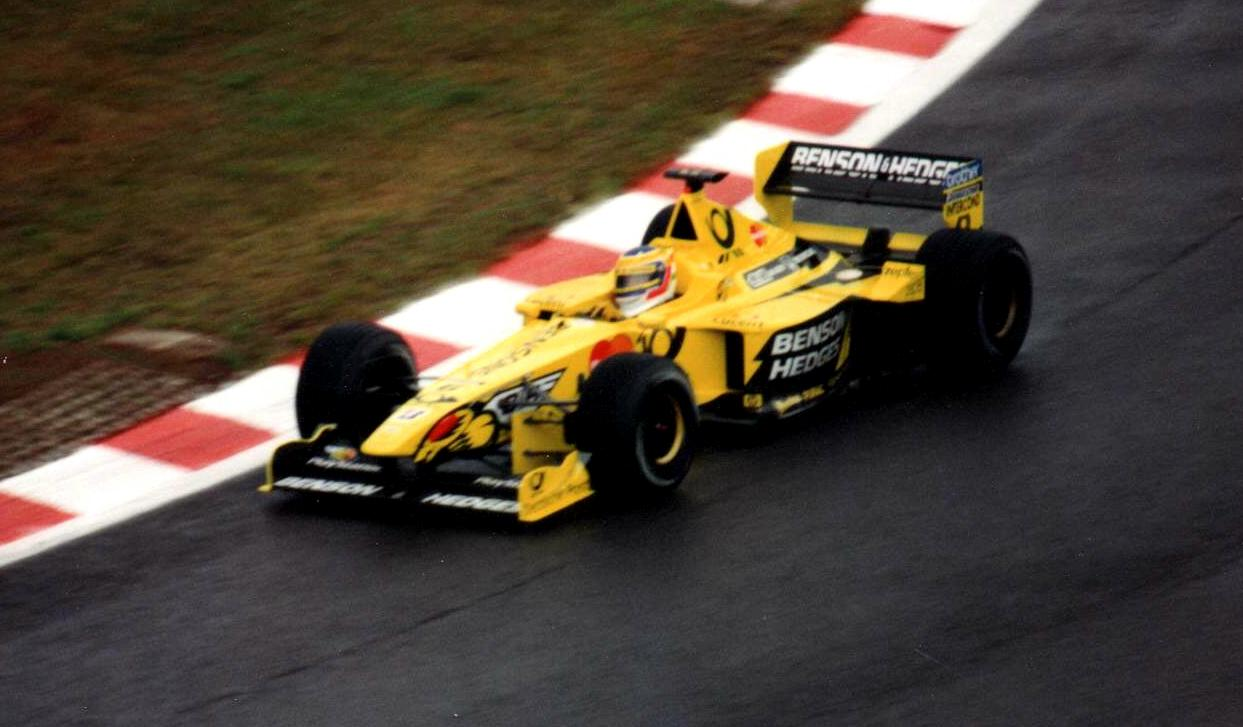
Jarno Trulli qualified in the front row of the grid, behind Mika Häkkinen.

There were four practice sessions preceding Sunday's race, two one-hour sessions Friday and two 45-minute sessions on Saturday. Conditions were dry for the Friday morning and afternoon practice sessions. A dense layer of dust was gradually cleared from the track. Coulthard set the first session's fastest time with a lap of 1:53.398, eight-tenths of a second quicker than Michael Schumacher. Häkkinen had the third-fastest time, with Jarno Trulli for Jordan, Barrichello and British American Racing's (BAR) Jacques Villeneuve in the next three positions. The two Benetton drivers were seventh and eighth (with Wurz ahead of Fisichella), and the Williams cars of Ralf Schumacher and Button completed the top ten. Alesi's Prost had a fuel-pressure problem which prevented him from completing a timed lap, and he was the slowest overall. Button almost hit the tyre wall at La Source and avoided losing control of the rear of his car under braking for the Bus Stop chicane. Ferrari limited their running during the session to limit their tyre usage.

In the second practice session, due to a slow rear puncture Coulthard's first-session lap was still the fastest; Häkkinen had the second-fastest time. Jaguar driver Johnny Herbert changed his car's balance, improving its performance and finishing third-fastest. Villeneuve moved into fourth after changes to his car's setup; Michael Schumacher slipped to fifth, and Wurz finished sixth. Verstappen was seventh-fastest, ahead of Fisichella, Barrichello and Trulli in positions eight through ten.

The weather remained dry for the Saturday-morning practice sessions. Häkkinen set the fastest lap of the third session at 1:51.043, quicker than his best on Friday and ahead of Frentzen, Trulli and Ralf Schumacher. Coulthard, who had an engine problem early in the session, was fifth-fastest (ahead of Button and Michael Schumacher). Alesi, Villeneuve and Sauber driver Nick Heidfeld rounded out the top ten. During the final practice session Häkkinen could not improve his time, although he remained the fastest. Button, much happier with his car's handling, set the second-fastest time. The Jordan drivers were third and fourth, with Trulli ahead of Frentzen. Ralf Schumacher and Coulthard completed the top six. Of the slower drivers, Marc Gené's Minardi car shed its engine cover but he was able to return to his garage.

== Qualifying ==
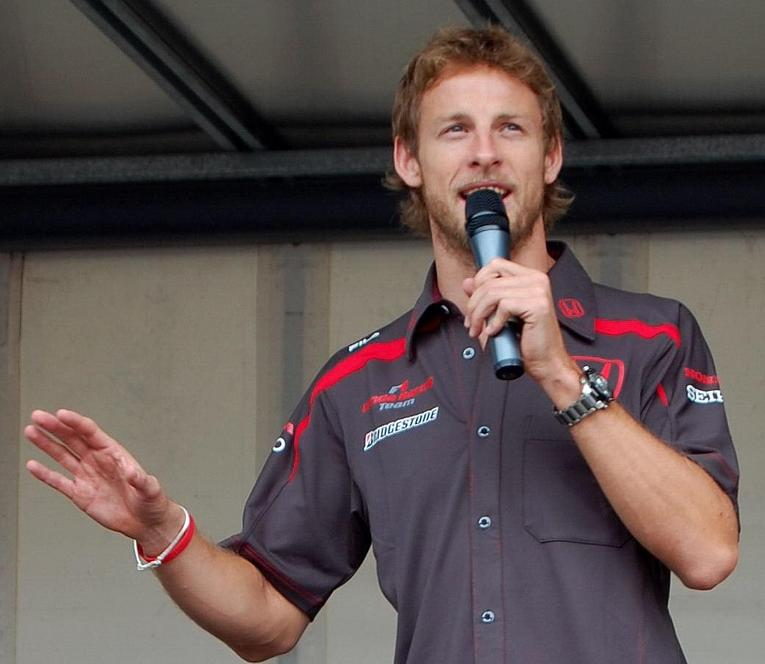
Jenson Button (pictured in 2007) qualified in third position, his best qualifying result of the season.

During Saturday's one-hour qualifying session, each driver was limited to twelve laps, with the starting order determined by their fastest laps. The 107% rule was in force during this session, requiring each driver to remain within 107% of the quickest lap time in order to qualify for the race. The session was held in clear and sunny weather. Häkkinen was unhindered by slower traffic, clinched his fifth pole position of the season and the 26th of his career with a time of 1:50.646; although he was optimistic about his race prospects, he was concerned about the start. Häkkinen was joined on the grid's front row by Trulli, who equalled his best qualifying performance of the season (at the Monaco Grand Prix) and the second time in the season he qualified on the front row. Trulli was also optimistic about his chances because of the Jordan team's strong record at the circuit. Button's car had a new qualifying engine installed in the rear, which was the same as his teammate's. Despite a power steering issue, he chose to fine-tune his setup and qualify third, his highest qualifying place of the season. He said he was happy with his starting position. Michael Schumacher, whose fastest lap had been hampered by traffic and a yellow flag for an incident for Alesi's spin at the Bus Stop chicane, secured fourth after being demoted to the position by Button, nine-tenths of a second behind Häkkinen, setting a lap which demoted Häkkinen's teammate Coulthard into fifth. Coulthard, who had problems with grip, believed that he could have lapped faster due to slower cars impeding his final two runs and a requirement to slow for the Bus Stop chicane following an incident.

Ralf Schumacher secured sixth position after being caught in traffic during his final run, keeping the Williams driver from a quicker lap time. Villeneuve, in seventh, reported oversteering, and was upset he could not go through Eau Rouge corner at high speed. Frentzen qualified eighth; his best lap time was disqualified after Coulthard blocked him at the Bus Stop chicane, which caused Frentzen to run onto the grass. He retaliated by slowing Coulthard into La Source corner at the start of his following lap. Herbert and Barrichello were ninth and tenth; Barrichello spun at the chicane during his third run after locking his brakes. Fisichella, eleventh, missed the top ten by three-tenths of a second on his only quick qualifying run. Herbert's teammate, Eddie Irvine, qualified twelfth with tyre-grip problems. He was ahead of Zonta in the slower of the two BARs (which lost a half-second through Eau Rouge), Heidfeld in the faster Prost, Sauber's Pedro Diniz and Arrows driver Pedro de la Rosa. Alesi qualified 17th, despite spinning at the Bus Stop chicane and triggering a yellow flag, preventing several drivers from lapping quicker. Salo qualified 18th due to car issues caused by a lack of grip, ahead of Wurz (who suffered engine troubles, causing smoke to billow from it on the entry to the Bus Stop chicane on his outlap, and shared the spare Benetton monocoque with Fisichella). Verstappen, after a braking error at La Source, and the two Minardi drivers of Gené and Mazzacane qualified at the back of the grid, in positions 20 to 22.

=== Qualifying classification ===
Pos	No	Driver	Constructor	Lap	Gap
1	1	(Finland) Mika Häkkinen	McLaren-Mercedes	1:50.646	—
2	6	(Italy) Jarno Trulli	Jordan-Mugen-Honda	1:51.419	+0.773
3	10	(United Kingdom) Jenson Button	Williams-BMW	1:51.444	+0.798
4	3	(Germany) Michael Schumacher	Ferrari	1:51.552	+0.906
5	2	(United Kingdom) David Coulthard	McLaren-Mercedes	1:51.587	+0.941
6	9	(Germany) Ralf Schumacher	Williams-BMW	1:51.743	+1.097
7	22	(Canada) Jacques Villeneuve	BAR-Honda	1:51.799	+1.153
8	5	(Germany) Heinz-Harald Frentzen	Jordan-Mugen-Honda	1:51.926	+1.280
9	8	(United Kingdom) Johnny Herbert	Jaguar-Cosworth	1:52.242	+1.596
10	4	(Brazil) Rubens Barrichello	Ferrari	1:52.444	+1.798
11	11	(Italy) Giancarlo Fisichella	Benetton-Playlife	1:52.796	+2.110
12	7	(United Kingdom) Eddie Irvine	Jaguar-Cosworth	1:52.885	+2.239
13	23	(Brazil) Ricardo Zonta	BAR-Honda	1:53.002	+2.356
14	15	(Germany) Nick Heidfeld	Prost-Peugeot	1:53.193	+2.547
15	16	(Brazil) Pedro Diniz	Sauber-Petronas	1:53.211	+2.565
16	18	(Spain) Pedro de la Rosa	Arrows-Supertec	1:53.237	+2.591
17	14	(France) Jean Alesi	Prost-Peugeot	1:53.309	+2.663
18	17	(Finland) Mika Salo	Sauber-Petronas	1:53.357	+2.711
19	12	(Austria) Alexander Wurz	Benetton-Playlife	1:53.403	+2.757
20	19	(Netherlands) Jos Verstappen	Arrows-Supertec	1:53.912	+3.266
21	20	(Spain) Marc Gené	Minardi-Fondmetal	1:54.680	+4.034
22	21	(Argentina) Gastón Mazzacane	Minardi-Fondmetal	1:54.784	+4.138
107% time: 1:58.391

== Warm-up ==
The drivers took the track at 09:30 Central European Summer Time (UTC+2) for a 30-minute warm-up in wet weather, with lap times 13 seconds slower than the previous days' practice and qualifying sessions. Heavy rain fell early in the morning from 5:00 am and it increased incrementally before stopping; a rising mist formed low on the track by dawn. Drivers used full-wet tyres on the slippery track, then intermediate rain tyres when it began drying. Häkkinen set the fastest lap time of the session at 2:03.392. Michael Schumacher was the second-fastest driver; Button was third, two-thousands of a second slower than Schumacher. Barrichello was fourth and Coulthard completed the five fastest drivers.

After spinning sideways because his left-rear wheel touched a damp white line, Fisichella struck the tyre barrier at Stavelot corner with enough force to launch him into the air. He landed upside-down on the vehicle's roll-hoop; the session was suspended for approximately 20 minutes while marshals cleared the track of debris and repaired the wall. Fisichella sustained a bruised left knee, and had to start the race with his team's spare car. Villeneuve damaged his car's rear in a crash against the tyre barrier at Les Fagnes turn later in the session, but was able to continue.

== Race ==
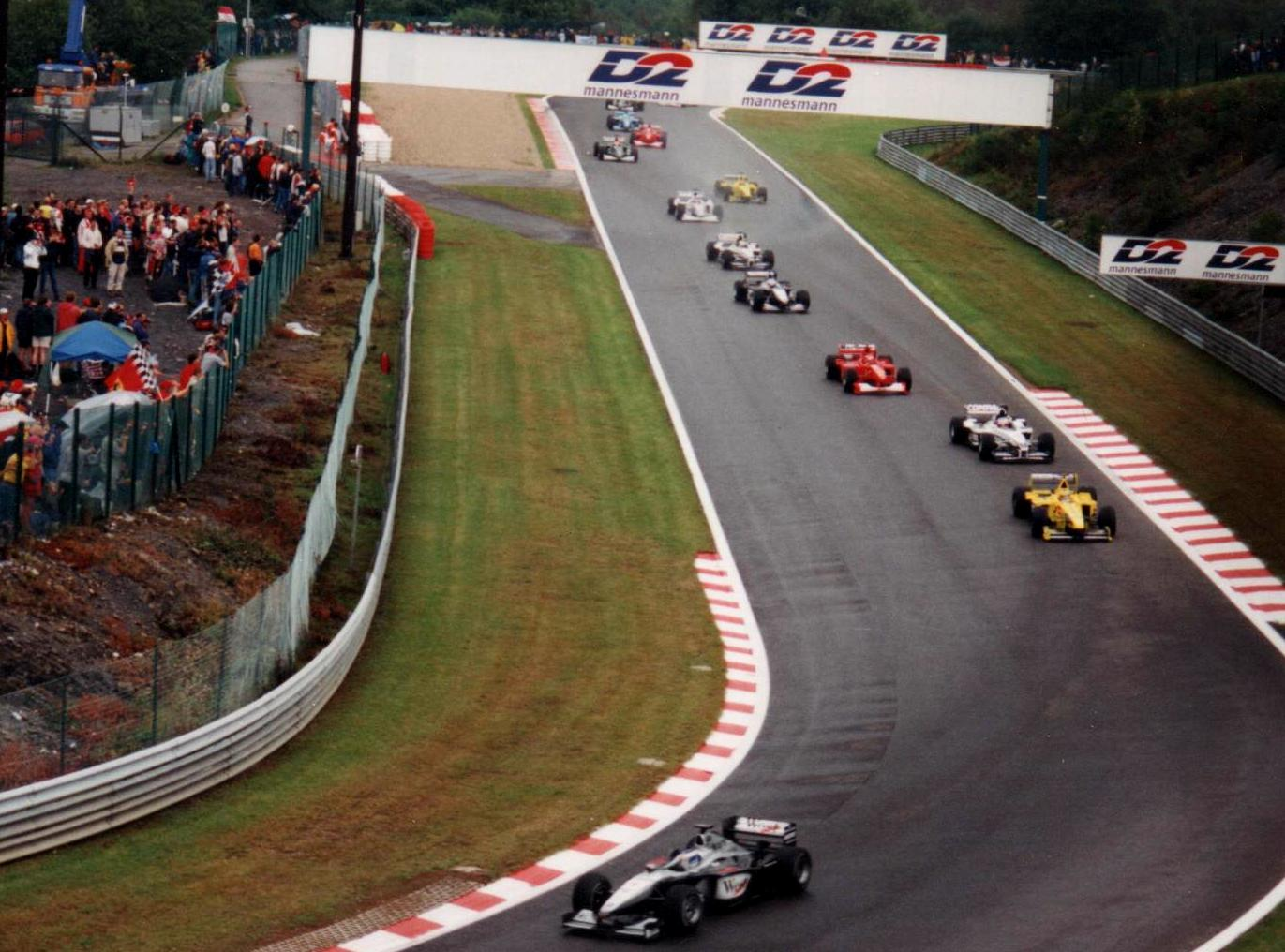
Häkkinen led for the first part of the race. Although it did not rain during the race, the track was wet and spray impaired the drivers' visibility.

The 44 lap 306.592 km (190.507 mi) race, commenced before 83,000 spectators at 14:00 local time, with air and track temperatures at 15 °C (59 °F); clouds, but no rain, were predicted for the race. The rain had stopped approximately an hour before the race began, but there was standing water on the track, causing heavy spray and poor visibility, the race would begin behind the safety car after consultation between the drivers and FIA race director Charlie Whiting on the track's state; the organisers were keen to avoid a multi-car pileup as experienced at the 1998 race. All cars except Pedro Diniz's had wet tyres. The intermediate and full wet tyres were reported to be suitable for short stints, thus the normal wet or grooved tyres were the tyre selection for the event. Every driver had a car setup with compromises made for wet-weather conditions and additions to downforce as well as setup changes for dry weather racing.

Instead of a two-by-two standing start, the race began with an American-style single file rolling start with no formation lap. During the safety car period, Diniz spun off; he was passed by De la Rosa, who received a ten-second stop and go penalty which he served on lap 13. The safety car entered the pit lane after one lap, and the cars were allowed to overtake after crossing the start-finish line. Häkkinen maintained his lead going into the first corner, followed by Trulli, Button, Michael Schumacher and Coulthard. Barrichello overtook Herbert for ninth place at the first turn after Herbert made an error. At the end of the first racing lap, Diniz dropped to the rear of the field. De la Rosa lost 16th position on lap three after running wide at turn 18, losing two places to Alesi and Verstappen.

Häkkinen began to pull away from Trulli, who ran with a car heavy with fuel and was dealing with worn rear tyres. Attention switched to Button, who tried to pass Trulli, who he felt was baulking him and noticed Michael Schumacher approaching him. On the fourth lap Button slipstreamed Trulli on the approach to the Bus Stop chicane, but he ran wide and left the inside open for Michael Schumacher to take third position. On that lap, Alesi was the first driver to pit for dry tyres after informing his team over the radio of his intent to do so when the track began to dry. By the beginning of the fifth lap Häkkinen increased his lead over Trulli to 9.1 seconds, ahead of Michael Schumacher, Button and Coulthard. Schumacher then took second place from Trulli at La Source. Button was anxious to recover from his error and attempted to follow Schumacher down the inside at the same corner, but Button and Trulli collided. Trulli was sent into a spin, becoming the first retirement of the race after he stalled the engine. Button lost two positions to Coulthard and Ralf Schumacher into the Eau Rouge corner and he spent the next three laps inspecting his car for damage. He sustained front wing and minor steering damage.

As the dry line continued to appear on the circuit, Alesi's dry tyre performance saw him lap quicker than the race leaders, encouraging other teams to bring their drivers into the pit lane for dry tyres. Michael and Ralf Schumacher were the first leaders to pit for dry tyres on lap six. Häkkinen made a pit stop from the lead on lap seven, followed by Button, and re-emerged ahead of Coulthard to retain the lead. Coulthard was required to stay on the track on deteriorating wet-weather tyres while his team tended to Häkkinen. He made his pit stop on the eighth lap, re-emerging in ninth position, behind Frentzen. All drivers made pit stops by the end of lap nine. The race order at the time was Häkkinen, Michael Schumacher, Ralf Schumacher, Alesi, Button, and Villeneuve. During that lap Barrichello overtook Frentzen for seventh, whilst Verstappen and Fisichella collided after Verstappen tried to pass the slowing Benetton at the Bus Stop chicane. Verstappen sustained damage to his front wing, and Fisichella later retired with an electrical problem caused by a loss of power.

By the beginning of lap 13, Michael Schumacher closed the gap from Häkkinen to about 4.6 seconds after setting four consecutive fastest laps. Later in the lap, one of Häkkinen's wheels touched a damp kerb at Stavelot corner, sending him high-speed spinning sideways for hundreds of yards into the grass; Michael Schumacher took the lead, as a result of Häkkinen's error, which cost the McLaren driver ten seconds, who was now six seconds behind Michael Schumacher. Heidfeld was the race's third retirement when his car developed an engine failure caused by a broken gearbox that affected the common oil circuit. Alesi, the first front-runner to make a scheduled pit stop on lap 18, rejoined in tenth. During the next two laps Salo passed Irvine for twelfth, whilst Barrichello made a pit stop from sixth position and came out in eleventh.

By lap 21, Michael Schumacher had increased his lead over Häkkinen to eleven-and-a-half seconds because he had six laps less fuel than the McLaren driver. Ralf Schumacher, ten seconds behind Häkkinen, led teammate Button by six seconds. Michael Schumacher made a pit stop on that lap that took 11.1 seconds to complete and took on enough fuel to complete the race, emerging in third position. On lap 23 Barrichello passed Herbert for ninth position, and during the next two laps Villeneuve and Ralf Schumacher made pit stops. Button made a pit stop from fourth position on lap 26. Häkkinen entered the pit lane one lap later after holding five more laps of fuel than Michael Schumacher and an adjustment to his car made it faster; Häkkinen was told by his team (on pit boards) to speed up to gain on Michael Schumacher, who had a heavier fuel load, and was 7.7 seconds behind after gaining on him. Button dropped to eighth position, and Häkkinen came out behind Michael Schumacher. Frentzen and Coulthard made their pit stops together on lap 28, with Coulthard emerging ahead of Frentzen. On that lap, Barrichello passed Alesi for sixth position.

Barrichello, setting the race's fastest lap (1:53.803 on lap 30), had consecutive fastest laps before making his second pit stop on lap 31. However, his car's fuel pressure dropped which caused him to run out of fuel and he was pushed by marshals into the pit lane. Barrichello and Alesi (who had a similar problem caused by a fractured fuel system) retired, and Button inherited fourth place. Salo was the final scheduled driver to make a pit stop, on lap 33. At the end of lap 34, after all scheduled pit stops, the running order was Michael Schumacher, Häkkinen, Ralf Schumacher, Button, Coulthard, and Frentzen. During that lap Michael Schumacher's soft compound tyres began to degrade on the drying track, and he ran off the racing line to cool them by driving through water; Häkkinen gradually closed the gap, due to his McLaren having a straightline speed advantage on the straights since McLaren were running a different downforce configuration to Ferrari. He began duelling Michael Schumacher for the race lead as the track had become completely dry. Coulthard, fifth, passed Button on the outside entering Les Combes corner for fourth on lap 37.

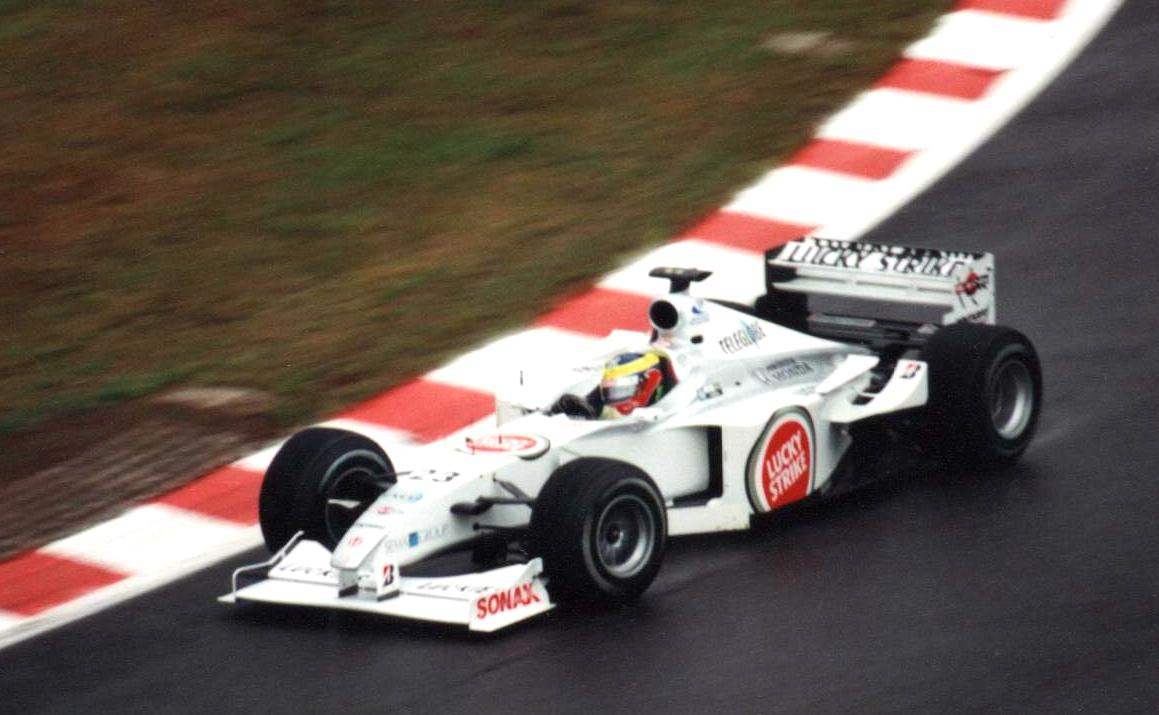
Ricardo Zonta was lapped by Häkkinen and Michael Schumacher while they were battling for the lead.

Häkkinen tried to pass Michael Schumacher on the inside for the lead on the 40th lap on the approach to Les Combes turn, (after drafting behind him on the straightaway), Schumacher blocked him late in the manoevure to defend his position. The drivers made contact, with Häkkinen sustaining minor damage to his front wing from contact with Schumacher's right-rear wheel and being forced to slow. During the following lap, Häkkinen was quicker through Eau Rouge turn by taking the corner at full throttle and drew closer to Michael Schumacher, who was told he was slower than Häkkinen on the straights. While they were lapping Zonta's slower car who was on the centre of the circuit, Häkkinen steered right onto a damp patch to pass Schumacher for the lead after Schumacher turned left believing there was insufficient space on the right and had hoped the slipstream from Zonta's car would help him maintain the race lead for an additional lap but was ineffective since Zonta was much slower than Schumacher. Zonta had slowed to allow Schumacher through and Häkkinen turned left with the extra momentum gained from the slipstream from both Schumacher and Zonta's cars to be ahead into the right-hand Les Combes corner at 328 km/h (204 mph) with both drivers having been either side of Zonta.

Häkkinen kept the lead for the rest of the race, crossing the finish line on lap 44 for his fourth victory of the season and his 18th in Formula One in a time of 1'28:14.494—an average speed of 208.467 km/h (129.535 mph). Michael Schumacher finished second, 1.1 seconds behind Häkkinen. Ralf Schumacher was third but became worried about a possible engine failure in the final six laps (a throttle fault nearly forced him to retire). Coulthard finished fourth after being on the track longer than teammate Häkkinen before his pit stop for dry tyres. Button followed in fifth and Frentzen completed the points scorers in sixth. Villeneuve (who reported race-long handling issues), Herbert, Salo, Irvine and Diniz filled the next five positions. Zonta, Wurz, Gené and Verstappen finished a lap behind the leader, and De la Rosa and Mazzacane were the final finishers. 17 of the 22 starters finished the Grand Prix.

=== After the race ===
The top three drivers appeared on the podium to collect their trophies and at a later press conference. Häkkinen was delighted with his victory, saying: "This was an incredible win. It was a very difficult and unusual situation including my spin which of course was not planned. The kerbs here are very slippery and once you go over one there is not much you can do. I was lucky to keep going and I was able to chase Michael. But the car got better and better." The driver added that he wanted to review his overtaking manoeuvre to see if Michael Schumacher performed an illegal move. Schumacher said that despite improvements to his car, he was unable to match Häkkinen's overall pace. He added that he experienced no problems running off-line to cool his tyres, and was happy to run behind slower cars for straight-line speed assistance during the race's closing stages.

Ralf Schumacher said, "I'm more than happy; we have been strong here the whole weekend and my car behaved perfectly. I had a little moment of worry about six laps from the end when the throttle didn't seem to pick up properly and I thought the engine was going to stop, but it came back and all was well." Schumacher added that his team was confident of remaining third in the Constructors' Championship; although he could not match Häkkinen's pace, he praised the team for his car's set-up. Coulthard was disappointed with his fourth-place finish, and thought his team's decision to call him into the pit lane after his competitors put him at a disadvantage; however, he remained confident about his championship chances. Button was also disappointed to finish fifth, stating: "It was a bad race for me, if not the worst. The car was working well at the start, but when I tried to pass Jarno I went in a bit late." Trulli refused to criticise Button after the race, believing that Button made a mistake. Fisichella and Verstappen felt similarly about their lap-nine collision, with Fisichella saying that he "felt sorry" for Verstappen and describing his weekend as "disastrous". Verstappen said that he struggled with his car's balance, which resulted in oversteer. He was "happy to go home" because "it's not been a good weekend". Frentzen said that although he was happy to score points, he had hoped for a better finish.

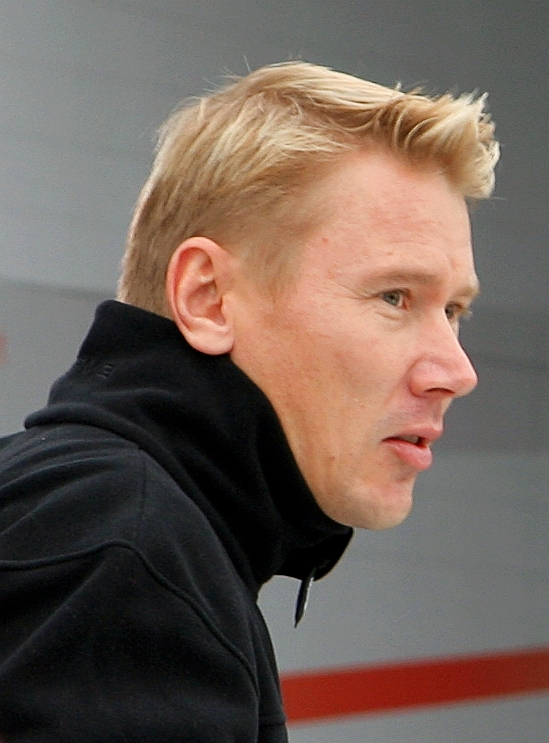
Mika Häkkinen won the race from the pole position after recovering from a spin.

The media focused on Häkkinen overtaking Michael Schumacher for the lead on lap 41. After the race, Häkkinen went to Schumacher in parc fermé and told him not to make such a manoeuvre with at high speed that he deemed "a life and death situation" and not to make a move like that again. Zonta later said that although he was unaware of Häkkinen's presence, he saw Schumacher in his mirrors. Schumacher would go on to be complimentary of the manoeuvre. Derick Allsop of The Independent described the impact the move might have on Häkkinen's career, commenting: "Perhaps, he [Mika Häkkinen] will be recognised as a driver worthy of a place in the pantheon of the sport's heroes." McLaren team principal Ron Dennis said: "His overtaking manoeuvre I'm sure will go down as one of the greatest in Formula One history." In February 2001, Häkkinen's move was chosen by more than 60 Formula One historians as the MasterCard Priceless Moment of the 2000 F1 season.

The use of a safety car to start the race had a mixed response within the sport. Coulthard agreed with the FIA's decision, saying: "I know there will be a debate over it but the fact is I was asked beforehand and I said that, based on the previous years we've had here, the safest thing is to have a safety-car start." He added that although the safety-car start eliminated overtaking, it also prevented a major accident. Ralf Schumacher also agreed with the decision to start under safety-car conditions. ITV-F1 commentator and former driver Martin Brundle felt that the track was not wet enough for a safety car. Journalist Nigel Roebuck said that the length of time under safety-car conditions was inadequate, and raised the possibility of abandoning standing starts. Whiting consulted Coulthard, the drivers' representative, before making his decision.

After the race, Häkkinen remained in the World Drivers' Championship lead with 74 championship points. Michael Schumacher was second with 68 championship points, seven ahead of Coulthard and nineteen ahead of Barrichello. Ralf Schumacher passed Fisichella for fifth place with 20 championship points, and Frentzen moved ahead of teammate Trulli and Salo. In the World Constructors' Championship, McLaren maintained their lead with 125 championship points and Ferrari remained in second with 117 championship points. Williams increased their lead over Benetton to 12 championship points, and Jordan remained fifth with 13 championship points. Given Häkkinen's increased lead, Michael Schumacher acknowledged that his team lacked speed against McLaren in the season's four remaining races but remained confident of winning the world championship.

=== Race classification ===
Drivers who scored championship points are denoted in bold.

Pos	No	Driver	Constructor	Laps	Time/Retired	Grid	Points
1	1	(Finland) **Mika Häkkinen**	**McLaren-Mercedes**	44	1:28:14.494	1	10
2	3	(Germany) **Michael Schumacher**	**Ferrari**	44	+1.104	4	6
3	9	(Germany) **Ralf Schumacher**	**Williams-BMW**	44	+38.096	6	4
4	2	(United Kingdom) **David Coulthard**	**McLaren-Mercedes**	44	+43.281	5	3
5	10	(United Kingdom) **Jenson Button**	**Williams-BMW**	44	+49.914	3	2
6	5	(Germany) **Heinz-Harald Frentzen**	**Jordan-Mugen-Honda**	44	+55.984	8	1
7	22	(Canada) Jacques Villeneuve	BAR-Honda	44	+1:12.380	7	
8	8	(United Kingdom) Johnny Herbert	Jaguar-Cosworth	44	+1:27.808	9	
9	17	(Finland) Mika Salo	Sauber-Petronas	44	+1:28.670	18	
10	7	(United Kingdom) Eddie Irvine	Jaguar-Cosworth	44	+1:31.555	12	
11	16	(Brazil) Pedro Diniz	Sauber-Petronas	44	+1:34.123	15	
12	23	(Brazil) Ricardo Zonta	BAR-Honda	43	+1 Lap	13	
13	12	(Austria) Alexander Wurz	Benetton-Playlife	43	+1 Lap	19	
14	20	(Spain) Marc Gené	Minardi-Fondmetal	43	+1 Lap	21	
15	19	(Netherlands) Jos Verstappen	Arrows-Supertec	43	+1 Lap	20	
16	18	(Spain) Pedro de la Rosa	Arrows-Supertec	42	+2 Laps	16	
17	21	(Argentina) Gastón Mazzacane	Minardi-Fondmetal	42	+2 Laps	22	
Ret	4	(Brazil) Rubens Barrichello	Ferrari	32	Fuel pressure	10	
Ret	14	(France) Jean Alesi	Prost-Peugeot	32	Fuel pressure	17	
Ret	15	(Germany) Nick Heidfeld	Prost-Peugeot	12	Engine	14	
Ret	11	(Italy) Giancarlo Fisichella	Benetton-Playlife	8	Electrical	11	
Ret	6	(Italy) Jarno Trulli	Jordan-Mugen-Honda	4	Collision	2	

== Championship standings after the race ==
Drivers' Championship standings

+/–	Pos	Driver	Points
	1	(Finland) Mika Häkkinen*	74
	2	(Germany) Michael Schumacher*	68
	3	(United Kingdom) David Coulthard*	61
	4	(Brazil) Rubens Barrichello*	49
1	5	(Germany) Ralf Schumacher	20

Constructors' Championship standings

+/–	Pos	Constructor	Points
	1	(United Kingdom) McLaren-Mercedes*	125
	2	(Italy) Ferrari*	117
	3	(United Kingdom) Williams-BMW	30
	4	(Italy) Benetton-Playlife	18
	5	(Republic of Ireland) Jordan-Mugen-Honda	13
Sources:

- Note: Only the top five positions are included for both sets of standings.
- Bold text and an asterisk indicates competitors who still had a theoretical chance of becoming World Champion.

Previous race: 2000 Hungarian Grand Prix	FIA Formula One World Championship; 2000 season	Next race: 2000 Italian Grand Prix
Previous race: 1999 Belgian Grand Prix	Belgian Grand Prix	Next race: 2001 Belgian Grand Prix
