= 2000 Italian Grand Prix =

Formula One motor race held in 2000

Coordinates: 45°36′56″N 9°16′52″E

Race 14 of 17 in the 2000 Formula One World Championship
← Previous race	Next race →
- Autodromo Nazionale di Monza (Modified in 2000)

Race details
- Date: 10 September 2000
- Official name: LXXI Gran Premio Campari d'Italia
- Location: Autodromo Nazionale di Monza, Monza, Lombardy, Italy
- Course: Permanent racing facility
- Course length: 5.793 km (3.600 miles)
- Distance: 53 laps, 306.764 km (190.614 miles)
- Weather: Sunny with temperatures reaching up to 29 °C (84 °F)

Pole position
Driver	(Germany) Michael Schumacher	Ferrari
- Time: 1:23.770

Fastest lap
Driver	(Finland) Mika Häkkinen	McLaren-Mercedes
- Time: 1:25.595 on lap 50

Podium
First	(Germany) Michael Schumacher	Ferrari
Second	(Finland) Mika Häkkinen	McLaren-Mercedes
Third	(Germany) Ralf Schumacher	Williams-BMW

The 2000 Italian Grand Prix (formally the LXXI Gran Premio Campari d'Italia) was a Formula One motor race held on 10 September 2000, at the Autodromo Nazionale di Monza near Monza, Lombardy, Italy, in front of an estimated 110,000 to 120,000 people. It was the 14th round of the 2000 Formula One World Championship and the season's final event in Europe. Ferrari's Michael Schumacher won the 53-lap race from pole position. McLaren's Mika Häkkinen took second and Williams' Ralf Schumacher was third.

Before the race, Häkkinen led the World Drivers' Championship and McLaren led the World Constructors' Championship. Michael Schumacher maintained the lead and held off Häkkinen's attempts to pass him going into the first corner. An incident involving four cars further around the lap necessitated the safety car's deployment and fire marshal Paolo Gislimberti was struck by a flying wheel from Heinz-Harald Frentzen's car. When the safety car was withdrawn at the end of lap eleven, Michael Schumacher began to pull away from Häkkinen and maintained the lead until his pit stop on the 39th lap. When Häkkinen made his pit stop three laps later, Michael Schumacher regained the lead, which he held to earn his sixth victory of the season and the 41st of his career, tying him with Ayrton Senna; Häkkinen came in second 3.8 seconds later.

As a result of the race results, Schumacher cut Häkkinen's World Drivers' Championship lead to two championship points, with David Coulthard another 17 championship points back. Rubens Barrichello, who was involved in the first-lap accident, was mathematically ruled out of winning the championship. McLaren's eight-point lead entering the Grand Prix was down to four with three races remaining in the season. Gislimberti died later in hospital, prompting a review of Formula One safety standards.

== Background ==
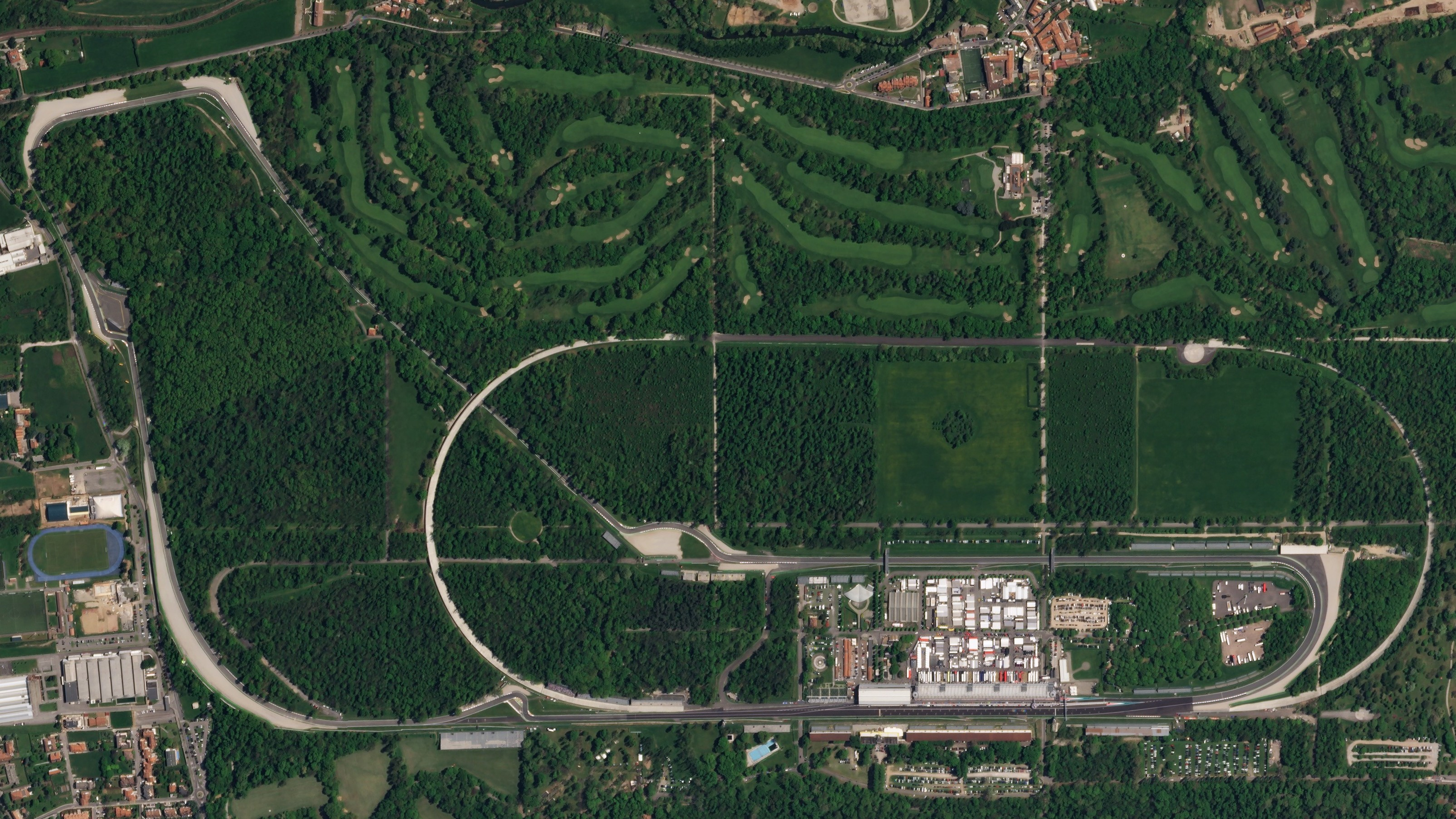
The Monza Circuit (pictured in 2018), where the race was held

On 10 September 2000, the 5.793 km (3.600 mi) clockwise Autodromo Nazionale di Monza near Monza in Lombardy, Italy, hosted the 13th round of 17th in the 2000 Formula One World Championship. It was the season's final European race. The event featured eleven teams (each representing a different constructor), each with two drivers with no changes to the season entry list. Control tyre supplier Bridgestone brought the hardest available compounds to the race, the medium and hard dry compounds. Because the Monza Circuit saw high average lap times, every team installed low incidence ailerons and the wings observed at the German Grand Prix.

McLaren's Mika Häkkinen led the World Drivers' Championship with 74 championship points going into the race, followed by Ferrari's Michael Schumacher on 68 championship points and Häkkinen's teammate David Coulthard on 61 championship points. Ferrari's Rubens Barrichello was fourth with 49 championship points and Williams' Ralf Schumacher was fifth with 20 championship points. McLaren led the World Constructors' Championship with 125 championship points, followed by Ferrari and Williams with 117 and 30 championship points, respectively, while Benetton were fourth with 18 championship points and Jordan were fifth with 13 championship points.

At the previous race in Belgium, the gap between Häkkinen (who won three of the preceding four races) and Michael Schumacher had grown to six points. Häkkinen began from pole position and led until the 13th lap, when he lost control of his car at Stavelot corner. He later lapped quicker than Michael Schumacher and passed him while both were lapping British American Racing (BAR) driver Ricardo Zonta with four laps remaining to win the race. The overtake was hailed as "the best ever manoeuvre in grand prix racing" by the international press and many Formula One individuals. Michael Schumacher remained confident about his title chances: "With only six points between Mika and I and four more races to go, I am still optimistic about our chances. One win or a retirement before the end of the season can change the whole picture either way."

The track was modified by its management to try and allow more overtaking. The main straight was straightened in July, and the Prima Variante and Seconda Variante chicanes were reconfigured by the race organisers to form a series of narrow corners with the exit away from the entry of turn one. The run-off areas around the circuit's two sections were expanded, and its tight kerbs removed. The Fédération Internationale de l'Automobile (FIA; Formula One's governing body) requested those changes. Some drivers were dissatisfied with the changes, fearing a multi-car accident on the first lap. Coulthard said that the new corner would make braking more difficult and expressed concern about the number of penalties issued to other drivers. However, Michael Schumacher believed his and other teams would be less concerned about suspension damage. Prost's Jean Alesi, the first driver to test the new circuit, said that drivers would be able to leave the track more easily in the event of a technical issue.

Following the Belgian Grand Prix on 27 August, the teams conducted a four-day testing session at Monza and concentrated on optimising their car set-ups for low downforce. Arrows' Jos Verstappen set the first day's quickest times, ahead of Sauber's Pedro Diniz. Coulthard was quickest on the second day. Benetton driver Giancarlo Fisichella crashed at high speed into the Ascari chicane, bringing a brief halt to testing. He visited Rome for a medical examination and was diagnosed with an inflamed tendon in his right ankle; he was cleared to race after five days of recuperation. Jacques Villeneuve lapped fastest for BAR on the third day as rain shortened the team's running. Minardi's Gastón Mazzacane had a high speed accident at the Ascari chicane, forcing testing to be stopped. Ralf Schumacher was fastest on testing's fourth and final day. Michael Schumacher's car developed a malfunction and pulled off the race track, limiting Ferrari's testing time as the car's power unit was changed.

== Practice ==
Two one-hour sessions on Friday and two 45-minute sessions on Saturday preceded Sunday's race. Drivers manoeuvred their cars on a hot track in dry weather. On Friday morning with ten minutes remaining, Barrichello set the first session's quickest time of 1:25.057 seconds on his final timed lap. He was three-tenths of a second faster than Jordan's Jarno Trulli in second. Michael Schumacher finished third, one-tenth of a second slower than Trulli, with Coulthard fourth. Pedro de la Rosa was fifth fastest, ahead of Arrows teammate Verstappen. Heinz-Harald Frentzen, Fisichella, Villeneuve, and Benetton's Alexander Wurz rounded out the top ten fastest drivers. Some drivers ran wide onto the Rettifilo chicane at least once during practice. Häkkinen did not set a timed lap due to a slipping clutch, which was rectified for the second session.

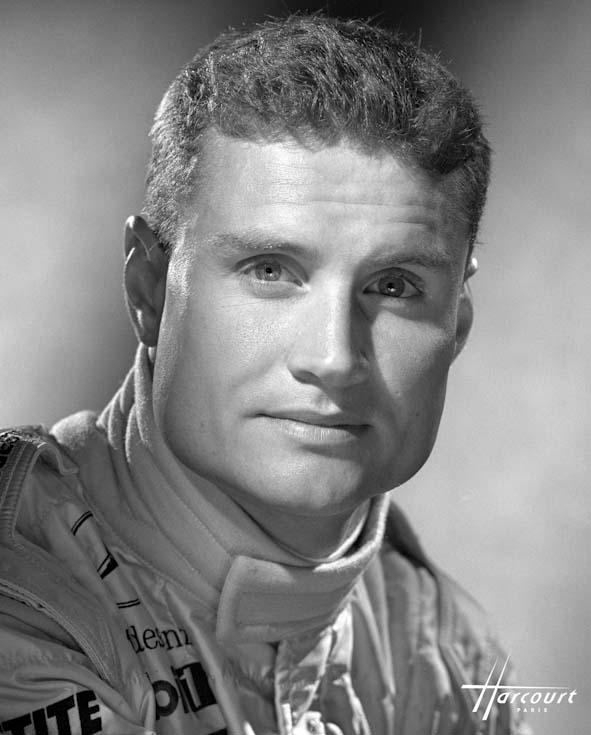
David Coulthard (pictured in 1999) crashed under braking during the second free practice session.

It was sunny and warm for the second practice session. Barrichello was again fastest despite not improving his time from the first session; Michael Schumacher, Trulli, Häkkinen, Coulthard, Jaguar's Eddie Irvine, De la Rosa, Diniz, Verstappen and Sauber's Mika Salo completed the top ten drivers. Alesi's car developed a hydraulic leak, limiting him to three timed laps and placing him last overall. Wurz was stopped at the exit of the Parabolica turn due to a similar problem. Mazzacane spun off and missed the rest of the session. Coulthard spun off under braking into the second Lesmo right-hand curve and beached his car in the gravel, breaking the McLaren's left-rear suspension arm and ending his running early.

Following a series of crashes at the first corner in recent events, drivers agreed to take a cautious approach at the first chicane at the drivers' meeting on Friday. If they did not gain a position or an advantage after concerns were raised, they would not be penalised ten seconds. The Saturday practice sessions were again held in dry, sunny weather. Michael Schumacher set the third session's fastest lap, a 1:24.262. The Williams drivers were in the top five, with Jenson Button second after a late-session lap and Ralf Schumacher fifth, separated by Coulthard and Barrichello in third and fourth. Fisichella, Villeneuve, Häkkinen, Salo and Jaguar's Johnny Herbert completed the top ten. In a crash at the fast Parabolica corner tyre wall, Frentzen went wide onto the edge of some dust, damaging the car's front-left corner. Häkkinen ran onto the gravel and struggled to regain control of his car.

Michael Schumacher set the final practice session's quickest lap time, a 1:23.904; Barrichello was third. Häkkinen separated them, with teammate Coulthard fourth-fastest. Ralf Schumacher lapped faster to maintain fifth place, ahead of teammate Jenson Button, who was unable to reproduce his third session performance. Fisichella, Zonta, Villeneuve and Irvine (who suffered a rear suspension failure but regained control of his car) rounded out the top ten. Mazzacane's engine ran out of air pressure and caused him to stop on the track again, while Wurz did not record any laps owing to a fuel pick-up issue. While his car was being repaired, Frentzen did not set any lap times.

== Qualifying ==
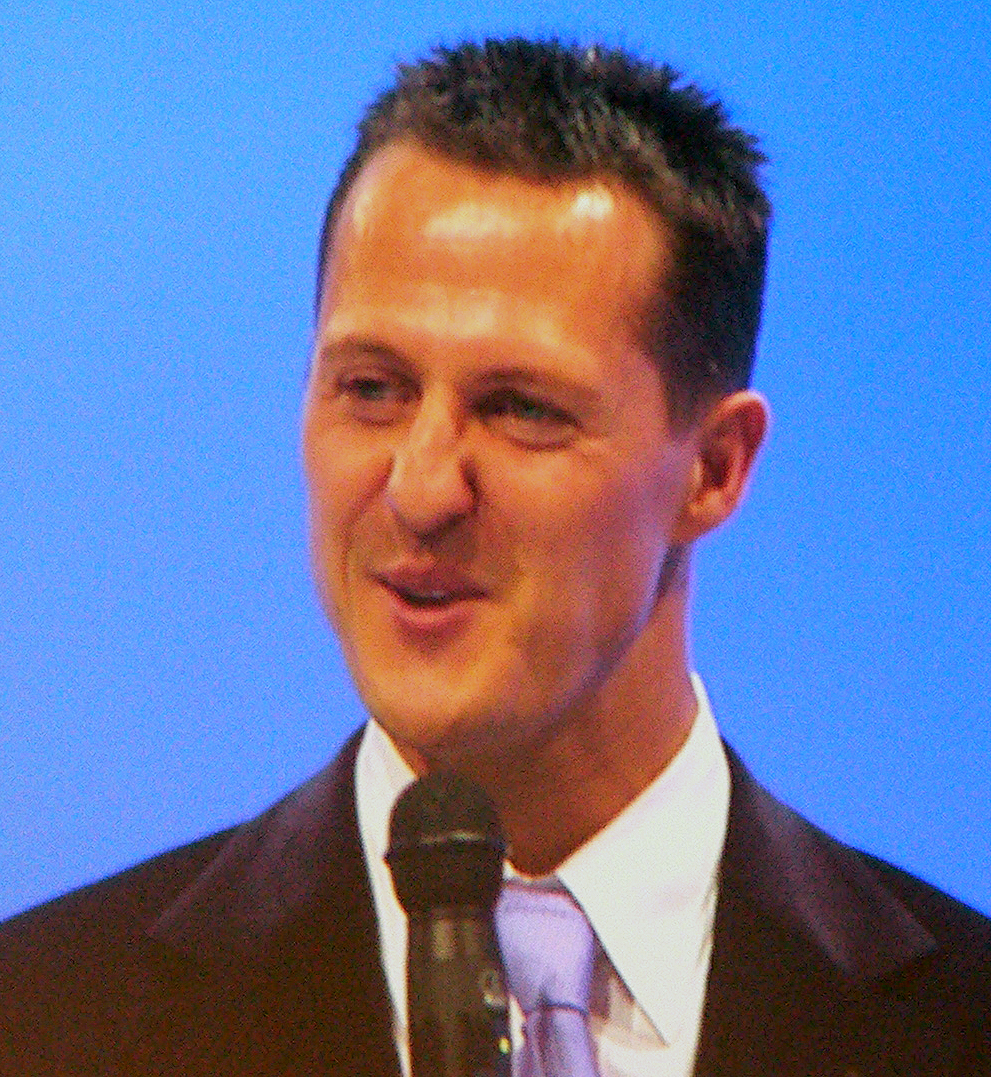
Michael Schumacher (pictured in 2007) qualified on pole position and achieved the race victory.

Each driver was limited to twelve laps during Saturday's one-hour qualifying session, with the starting position determined by their fastest laps. The 107% rule was in effect during qualifying, which required each driver to record a time within 107% of the fastest lap to qualify for the race. The session was held in dry weather. Michael Schumacher used his teammate's wing setup and undertray on his car to achieve his sixth pole position of the season and 29th of his career, with a time of 1:23.770. Despite being pleased with his car and tyres, he said that he did not have the best session due to a mistake at the first chicane during his first run. Michael Schumacher was joined on the front row by Barrichello, whose lap time was 0.027 seconds slower with ten minutes left and was happy to start alongside his teammate. Häkkinen qualified third following handling difficulties and his Mercedes V10 engine misfiring due to a fuel pressure fault, distracting him during his final two timed laps. Villeneuve recorded BAR's best qualifying result at the time and of his season, taking fourth on his final fast lap with 12 minutes remaining, nearly half a second behind Michael Schumacher. Despite a minor error on his first run, he was pleased with his performance. Häkkinen's teammate Coulthard took fifth after suffering traffic and car balance issues during qualifying. Frentzen blocked him leaving the Rettifilo chicane on his last run. Trulli and Frentzen were sixth and eighth respectively for Jordan; Trulli reported no problems while Frentzen was impeded by De la Rosa on his final quick run, losing him approximately four-tenths of a second. Ralf Schumacher, seventh, was disappointed with his performance, which saw him abort two runs owing to his braking position. Fisichella took ninth.

De la Rosa's modified his car and he qualified tenth with a fast lap recorded with two minutes remaining. His teammate Verstappen qualified eleventh after having to drive two of his team's cars when they had hydraulic and engine problems, causing him to stop in the gravel at Ascari corner. Button qualified twelfth after overheating his tyres and lacking control of his car after decreasing downforce. Wurz, 13th, used the session to familiarise himself with Benetton's spare car after lacking practice. He was ahead of Irvine in the faster of the two Jaguars, whose best time was one-tenth of a second faster than his teammate Johnny Herbert in 18th; both were disadvantaged by a lack of straightline speed. Salo, 15th, was the Sauber team's fastest driver, ahead of his teammate Diniz whose car handled badly under braking for the Rettifilo and della Roggia chicanes. The pair were marginally faster than Zonta, who had gear selection issues in his race car and had to stop on the track before switching to his team's spare vehicle configured for Villeneuve. Alesi and Nick Heidfeld in the Prosts were 18th and 19th after driving with understeer. They qualified ahead of the Minardis of Marc Gené and Mazzacane, who were 21st and 22nd; Mazzacane's car stopped at the Lesmo corners due to an electrical problem. He returned to the pit lane to drive the spare car.

=== Qualifying classification ===
Pos	No	Driver	Constructor	Time	Gap
1	3	(Germany) Michael Schumacher	Ferrari	1:23.770	—
2	4	(Brazil) Rubens Barrichello	Ferrari	1:23.797	+0.027
3	1	(Finland) Mika Häkkinen	McLaren-Mercedes	1:23.967	+0.197
4	22	(Canada) Jacques Villeneuve	BAR-Honda	1:24.238	+0.468
5	2	(United Kingdom) David Coulthard	McLaren-Mercedes	1:24.290	+0.520
6	6	(Italy) Jarno Trulli	Jordan-Mugen-Honda	1:24.477	+0.707
7	9	(Germany) Ralf Schumacher	Williams-BMW	1:24.516	+0.746
8	5	(Germany) Heinz-Harald Frentzen	Jordan-Mugen-Honda	1:24.786	+1.016
9	11	(Italy) Giancarlo Fisichella	Benetton-Playlife	1:24.789	+1.019
10	18	(Spain) Pedro de la Rosa	Arrows-Supertec	1:24.814	+1.044
11	19	(Netherlands) Jos Verstappen	Arrows-Supertec	1:24.820	+1.050
12	10	(United Kingdom) Jenson Button	Williams-BMW	1:24.907	+1.137
13	12	(Austria) Alexander Wurz	Benetton-Playlife	1:25.150	+1.380
14	7	(United Kingdom) Eddie Irvine	Jaguar-Cosworth	1:25.251	+1.481
15	17	(Finland) Mika Salo	Sauber-Petronas	1:25.322	+1.552
16	16	(Brazil) Pedro Diniz	Sauber-Petronas	1:25.324	+1.554
17	23	(Brazil) Ricardo Zonta	BAR-Honda	1:25.337	+1.567
18	8	(United Kingdom) Johnny Herbert	Jaguar-Cosworth	1:25.388	+1.618
19	14	(France) Jean Alesi	Prost-Peugeot	1:25.558	+1.788
20	15	(Germany) Nick Heidfeld	Prost-Peugeot	1:25.625	+1.855
21	20	(Spain) Marc Gené	Minardi-Fondmetal	1:26.336	+2.566
22	21	(Argentina) Gastón Mazzacane	Minardi-Fondmetal	1:27.360	+3.590
107% time: 1:29.634

== Warm-up ==
The drivers took to the track in dry weather at 09:30 Central European Summer Time (UTC +1) for a 30-minute warm-up session following a spell of mist that fell on the circuit. Despite a major oversteer at Parabolica corner, Zonta set the session's fastest lap of 1:26.448 with nine minutes left. He was six hundredths of a second faster than Häkkinen in warm-up's final seconds. Michael Schumacher was third, ahead of Coulthard in fourth, Verstappen in fifth and Salo in sixth. No major incidents occurred during the session. Coulthard spun out of control of his McLaren at the exit of the second chicane owing to a rear suspension problem, although he was able to rejoin to the track. Irvine spun at the second Lesmo right-hand turn but recovered and resumed driving.

== Race ==
The 53-lap, 306.764 km (190.614 mi) race started with around 110,000 to 120,000 people in attendance at 14:00 local time. The conditions for the race were dry, warm and sunny, with the air temperature 25 °C (77 °F) and the track temperature 34 and 37 °C (93 and 99 °F). Every driver began on the medium compound tyre because it was three-tenths of a second faster than the hard compound tyre. The race saw more tyre blistering because compound wear was worsened by braking hard for the first chicane. Mechanics worked on Heidfeld's car who managed to get it to the side of the circuit before the formation lap began to avoid a penalty.

Michael Schumacher kept his lead into the first corner, withstanding Häkkinen's attempts to pass on the inside by switching lines. Barrichello made a slow start on the inside and dropped from second to fifth place, leaving the fast starting Villeneuve stuck behind the Ferrari. Salo and Irvine collided into the first corner, and both drivers crashed into Diniz. Irvine retired with suspension damage, while Salo suffered a left-rear puncture and Diniz's front wing was removed.

A multi-car accident happened into the Variante della Roggia chicane (the second chicane). Barrichello attempted to pass Trulli on the inside as the following Frentzen on a light fuel load struck the left-rear corner of Trulli's vehicle with his right-front corner at nearly 300 km/h (190 mph). Frentzen then hit the right-rear corner of Barrichello's Ferrari with his car's left-front corner. All three cars spun and collected Coulthard, who was trying to turn into the chicane. All four cars spun into the gravel trap, creating a dense cloud of dust and smoke. Frentzen's right front wheel struck fire marshal Paolo Gislimberti (who had moved from his post and took his fire extinguisher with him) on the upper body exposed through the barrier on the circuit's left side. The following four drivers Villeneuve, Ralf Schumacher, Button, and Wurz passed through the scene without incident. The cloud blinded Herbert behind them, and the unsighted De la Rosa crashed into the back of Herbert's Jaguar. De la Rosa was propelled roughly 15 ft (4.6 m) into the air, barrel rolling and somersaulting. He went over the top of Coulthard's McLaren and landed upside down in the gravel across the suspension of Barrichello's Ferrari. None of the drivers involved were seriously injured. The rest of the field passed through the accident scene unscathed. Herbert retired in the pit lane with a missing wheel, and Zonta was hit by De la Rosa, causing a front puncture.

The race was neither stopped or the start aborted by FIA race director Charlie Whiting to allow those involved in the crash to return to the pit lane and get into their spare cars. Whiting deployed the safety car at the first lap's conclusion to allow marshals to remove strands of carbon fibre from the circuit and extricate the cars from the gravel trap. Gislimberti suffered head and chest injuries and was given a heart massage before being treated by doctors Sid Watkins and Gary Hartstein. Watkins and Harstein were not informed of Gislimberti's condition because of erroneous initial reports and were not told to drive to the accident location until race control received word of Gislimberti's injuries. Gislimberti was afterwards transported by ambulance to San Gerardo Hospital in cardiocirculatory arrest because helicopter transport would have taken longer. Salo became the fifth driver to pit on lap eight; his mechanics fitted a new engine cover and sidepods to correct handling problems. The wait for Harstein and Watkins in the medical car to return to their position at the pit lane exit after administering aid to Gislimberti and instructing marshals not to leave the stricken vehicles at the back of the gravel trap but to move them to a safer area extended the safety car period.

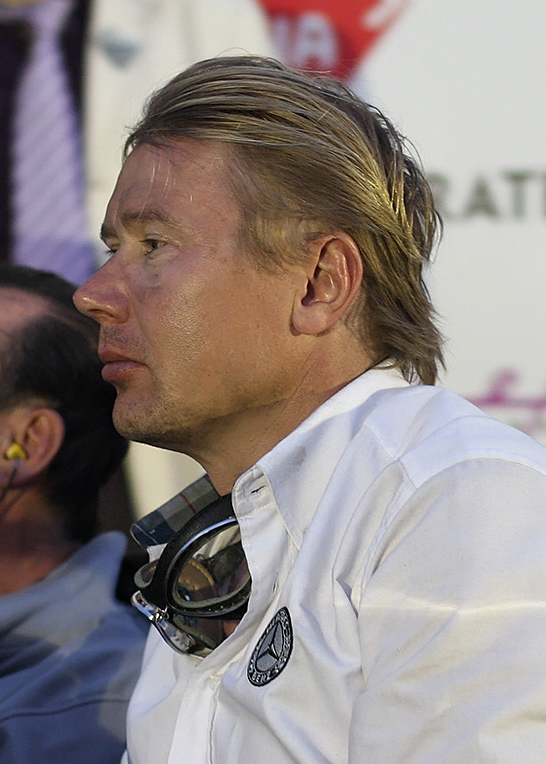
Mika Häkkinen (pictured in 2011) finished second.

After the safety car period ended on lap 11, Michael Schumacher bunched the field on the back straight between the Ascari chicane and Parabolica turn to prepare for the return to racing speeds. He braked and accelerated hard to generate heat into his brakes and tyres, causing the field to almost stop. This rapid drop in speed in the concertina effect surprised the five cars behind Michael Schumacher. In order to avoid colliding with Villeneuve, Button veered left onto the grass, hitting the guardrail barriers and damaging a wheel. He lost control of his car at the Parabolica curve because he had no steering and went into the gravel trap, retiring on lap 11. When the race restarted on lap 12, Michael Schumacher led, with Häkkinen and Villeneuve second and third. Behind them were Ralf Schumacher, Fisichella, and Wurz. Michael Schumacher began to immediately pull away from Häkkinen as he set consecutive fastest laps. Further down the field, Wurz overtook Diniz and Mazzacane for tenth place.

Michael Schumacher led Häkkinen by 1.4 seconds at the start of lap 13. Further back, Zonta passed Heidfeld to take ninth. On lap 14, Zonta moved into seventh after passing Gené and Wurz. Verstappen overtook Fisichella on the inside into the first chicane for fifth on the 15th lap. Villeneuve retired from third on the side of the track on that lap due to an electrical fault. This moved Ralf Schumacher to third. On the 16th lap, Ralf Schumacher briefly lost control of his car and was overtaken by Verstappen and Zonta. Heidfeld spun, stalled on track at the Variante della Roggia chicane and retired after his engine failed on the same lap. A second safety car deployment was put on standby as marshals had difficulty removing his car from the circuit. After that, there were no more retirements, and the battle at the front and back of the field received attention.

Salo passed Mazzacane for ninth place on lap 17. Verstappen attempted to pass Zonta at the start of the 19th lap as they approached the Variante Goodyear chicane; Verstappen quickly took a defensive position to stop Zonta. Two laps later, Zonta made an attempt to pass Verstappen on the inside into the Variante della Rogia chicane for third but was unsuccessful because he ran wide and allowed Verstappen to draw alongside on the outside. After leaving the chicane on the same lap, Verstappen momentarily reclaimed third place before Zonta passed him because of his more powerful engine. Verstappen unsuccessfully attempted to repass Zonta for third. Michael Schumacher lapped consistently in the 1:26 range, setting the race's new fastest lap on lap 22, a 1:26.428, to increase his advantage over Häkkinen to 5.4 seconds, who was 9.9 seconds ahead of Zonta. Verstappen was 2.9 seconds behind in fourth but was drawing clear of Ralf Schumacher in fifth. On lap 24, Zonta became the first front-runner to make a scheduled pit stop for fuel and tyres, emerging in eleventh place.

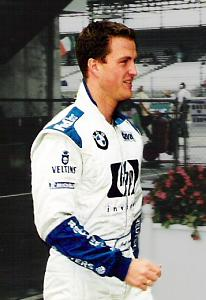
Ralf Schumacher (pictured in 2002) finished third for the second consecutive Grand Prix.

On lap 25, Salo passed Wurz for sixth place. Zonta overtook Mazzacane and Diniz on laps 26 and 27 to take eighth. Salo's second pit stop came on lap 29 and he emerged in tenth. Verstappen made his pit stop four laps later and returned to the circuit in seventh. Zonta made his third and final pit stop for fuel on lap 37 and dropped to eighth place. Zonta's final pit stop timing prevented him from finishing in the top three. Because little fuel was used during the safety car period, the race leaders sought to make their pit stops after two-thirds race distance. Michael Schumacher took his pit stop on the 40th lap and was stationary for 7.2 seconds. He rejoined the circuit 13.6 seconds behind Häkkinen, who moved into the race lead. Michael Schumacher immediately began pushing hard to ensure that Häkkinen would not have a significant advantage following his pit stop. Three laps later, Häkkinen made a 6.6-second pit stop. He rejoined the track twelve seconds behind Michael Schumacher. Fisichella was the final driver to make a scheduled stop on lap 44. His pit stop was problematic: he stalled with a clutch system fault and his mechanics push-started his Benetton. Fisichella lost time and fell to eleventh.

At the completion of lap 45, with the scheduled pit stops completed, the race order was Michael Schumacher, Häkkinen, Ralf Schumacher, Verstappen, Wurz, and Zonta. Zonta kept sixth despite going straight onto the escape road near the Variante Goodyear chicane. Häkkinen set out to close up to Michael Schumacher while encountering slower cars and being impeded by Mazzacane. He set the race's fastest lap of 1:25.595 on lap 50 and drew to with 6.2 seconds of Michael Schumacher when Schumacher eased off slightly. Michael Schumacher was able to maintain his lead and took his sixth victory of 2000 and the 41st of his career to go level with Ayrton Senna in a time of 1'27:31.368, at an average speed of 210.286 km/h (130.666 mph). Häkkinen came in second 3.8 seconds later, ahead of Ralf Schumacher, who finished third for the second successive race. Verstappen took fourth, Wurz finished fifth, and Zonta completed the points scorers in sixth, 1.8 seconds behind Wurz. Salo, Diniz, Gené, Mazzacane and Fisichella were in the next five positions a lap behind the winner, with Alesi the final classified finisher.

=== Post-race ===
The top three drivers collected their trophies on the podium and appeared in the subsequent press conference. Michael Schumacher began crying when asked if tying Senna's win total meant a lot to him. Later, when he had recovered his composure, he stressed the importance of maintaining engine's life at Monza. Michael Schumacher revealed that the reason for his emotion was because he was remembering Senna's death at the 1994 San Marino Grand Prix. He also expressed his surprise at the media's response, which said that Schumacher "was human after all." Häkkinen revealed that his team's adjustments to his car during his pit stop helped him set the race's fastest lap. He also acknowledged that the two Minardis' slowing him prevented him from catching Michael Schumacher. Ralf Schumacher said he was unworried by Verstappen and Zonta challenging him because of his quick car. He also was confident that Williams had confirmed itself as Formula One's third strongest team.

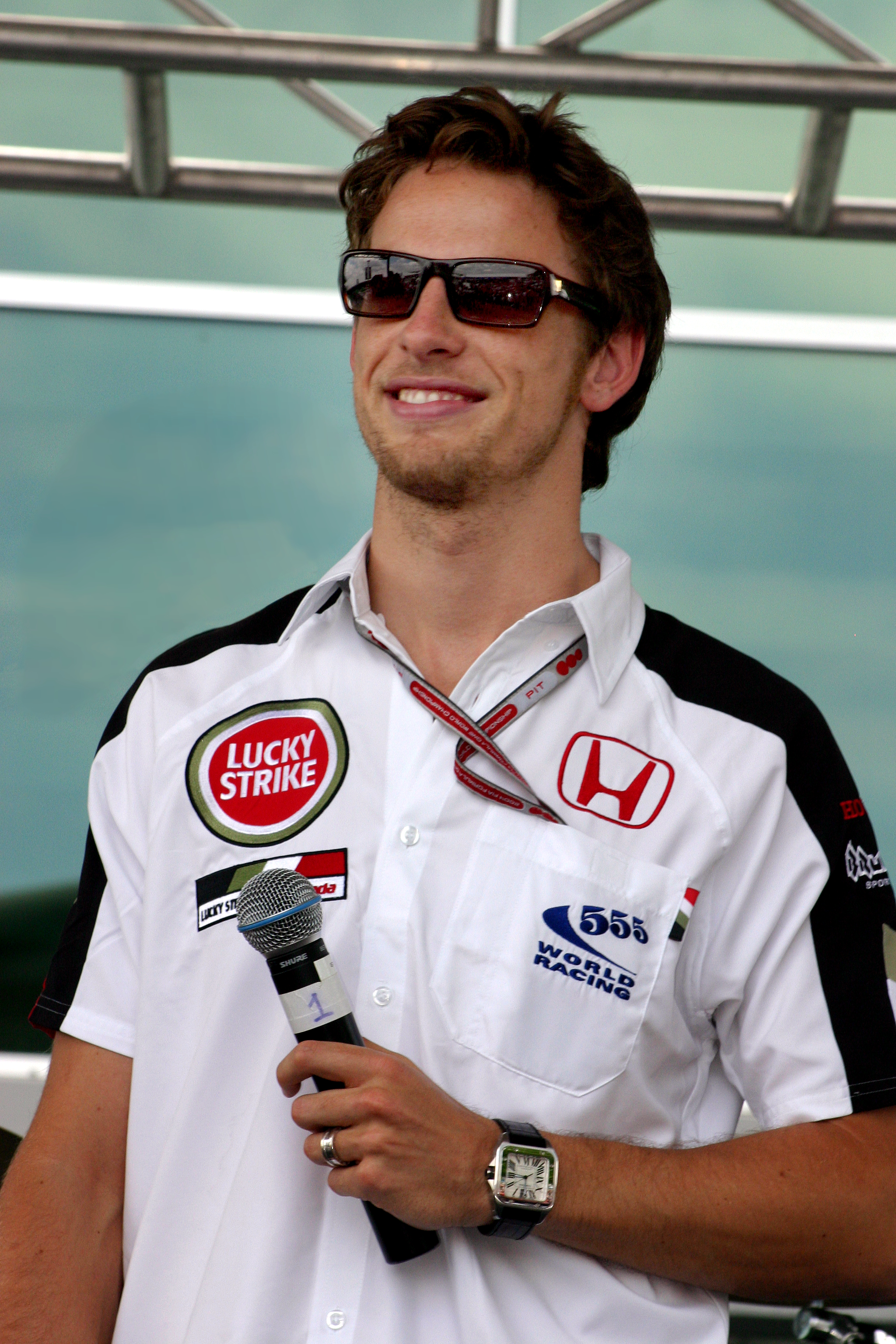
Jenson Button (pictured in 2004) blamed Michael Schumacher for causing him to retire from the Grand Prix on lap 11.

Button blamed race leader Michael Schumacher catching him out for his retirement, asking: "I thought you weren't allowed to do that?" Villeneuve disagreed, saying: "Michael was only doing what you're meant to do in that situation. The guys behind should calm down." Schumacher said he expected other drivers to generate heat in their brakes and apologised to those behind him if he caused them problems. Verstappen said he was pleased to finish fourth and commented on his pace: "I was pushing the whole race because I knew that I had to make up time from the bad start." Wurz expressed his happiness at finishing fifth despite a lack of preparation, adding: "fifth place made up for all this bad luck so far, and I'm really happy now with it." Zonta credited his car's speed with allowing him to finish sixth and overtake. He added that a better qualifying result would have allowed him to compete for a higher finishing position or a podium finish.

Following discussions with the drivers involved in the first lap accidents, the stewards deemed it was "a racing accident" with no single driver to blame. Barrichello blamed Frentzen for starting the lap one crash at the Variante della Roggia corner. He demanded that Frentzen be banned for ten races. Barrichello also stated that his helmet was damaged in the collision with De la Rosa. Frentzen responded by suggesting that Barrichello braked too early, causing him to collide with teammate Trulli. Whiting defended his decision not to stop the race, saying that the safety car was deployed because all cars involved were in the run-off areas and that stopping the race would be dangerous. However, he admitted to being unaware of Gislimberti's condition when making the decision. Eddie Jordan, the Jordan team's principal, believed Whiting had made the right decision and applauded the modern Formula One car's safety for protecting drivers.

Bernie Ecclestone, the owner of Formula One's commercial rights, called for the removal of chicanes from racing circuits, calling them "silly and unnecessary". Following that, FIA President Max Mosley announced that safety measures would be reviewed, as well as a review of the Monza track. Mosley believed that no driver was to blame for the accident but emphasised to competitors that it was their responsibility to be attentive when bunched up at a race start. Former driver Jacques Laffite advocated for an electronic warning system for marshals and thought chicanes should have been reviewed.

Gislimberti never regained consciousness and was pronounced dead at hospital. The Trento-born volunteer firefighter and provincial head water control engineer, who was vice-president of the CEA Squadra Corse firefighting organisation, predeceased his wife of two years, Elena (who was pregnant with his child), and other family members. His autopsy released two days later determined he died from head trauma. On 15 September, he was given a funeral at the San Ulderico church, Lavis, attended by several drivers, friends and colleagues. Five cars involved in the crash were impounded by Italian authorities hours after the race. Magistrate Salvatore Bellomo opened a formal investigation into the crash and interviewed drivers. The investigating body examined all five cars before returning them to the teams on 12 September. The investigation was closed in June 2001 after a technical study concluded that Gislimberti was killed instantly. Following Gislimberti's death, the strength of the wheel tethers was doubled to prevent flying tyres from endangering drivers, safety officials, and fans. The chassis would be reinforced, and improved crash resistance would be tested.

Michael Schumacher's victory reduced Häkkinen's lead in the World Drivers' Championship to two points. Coulthard remained in third with 61 points. Barrichello's retirement at the race ended his chances of becoming World Champion and Ralf Schumacher's third-place finish kept him in fifth place with 24 points. Ferrari's victory lowered McLaren's lead in the World Constructors' Championship to four points. Williams maintained third place with 34 points. Benetton in fourth strengthened its gap over Jordan in fifth to seven points with three races remaining in the season.

=== Race classification ===
Drivers who scored championship points are denoted in bold.

Pos	No	Driver	Constructor	Laps	Time/Retired	Grid	Points
1	3	(Germany) **Michael Schumacher**	**Ferrari**	53	1:27:31.638	1	10
2	1	(Finland) **Mika Häkkinen**	**McLaren-Mercedes**	53	+3.810	3	6
3	9	(Germany) **Ralf Schumacher**	**Williams-BMW**	53	+52.432	7	4
4	19	(Netherlands) **Jos Verstappen**	**Arrows-Supertec**	53	+59.938	11	3
5	12	(Austria) **Alexander Wurz**	**Benetton-Playlife**	53	+1:07.426	13	2
6	23	(Brazil) **Ricardo Zonta**	**BAR-Honda**	53	+1:09.292	17	1
7	17	(Finland) Mika Salo	Sauber-Petronas	52	+1 Lap	15	
8	16	(Brazil) Pedro Diniz	Sauber-Petronas	52	+1 Lap	16	
9	20	(Spain) Marc Gené	Minardi-Fondmetal	52	+1 Lap	21	
10	21	(Argentina) Gastón Mazzacane	Minardi-Fondmetal	52	+1 Lap	22	
11	11	(Italy) Giancarlo Fisichella	Benetton-Playlife	52	+1 Lap	9	
12	14	(France) Jean Alesi	Prost-Peugeot	51	+2 Laps	19	
Ret	15	(Germany) Nick Heidfeld	Prost-Peugeot	15	Spun off	20	
Ret	22	(Canada) Jacques Villeneuve	BAR-Honda	14	Electrical	4	
Ret	10	(United Kingdom) Jenson Button	Williams-BMW	10	Accident	12	
Ret	8	(United Kingdom) Johnny Herbert	Jaguar-Cosworth	1	Collision damage	18	
Ret	4	(Brazil) Rubens Barrichello	Ferrari	0	Collision	2	
Ret	2	(United Kingdom) David Coulthard	McLaren-Mercedes	0	Collision	5	
Ret	6	(Italy) Jarno Trulli	Jordan-Mugen-Honda	0	Collision	6	
Ret	5	(Germany) Heinz-Harald Frentzen	Jordan-Mugen-Honda	0	Collision	8	
Ret	18	(Spain) Pedro de la Rosa	Arrows-Supertec	0	Collision	10	
Ret	7	(United Kingdom) Eddie Irvine	Jaguar-Cosworth	0	Collision	14	

== Championship standings after the race ==
Drivers' Championship standings

+/–	Pos	Driver	Points
	1	(Finland) Mika Häkkinen*	80
	2	(Germany) Michael Schumacher*	78
	3	(United Kingdom) David Coulthard*	61
	4	(Brazil) Rubens Barrichello	49
	5	(Germany) Ralf Schumacher	24

Constructors' Championship standings

+/–	Pos	Constructor	Points
	1	(United Kingdom) McLaren-Mercedes*	131
	2	(Italy) Ferrari*	127
	3	(United Kingdom) Williams-BMW	34
	4	(Italy) Benetton-Playlife	20
	5	(Republic of Ireland) Jordan-Mugen-Honda	13
Sources:

- Note: Only the top five positions are included for both sets of standings.
- Bold text and an asterisk indicates competitors who still had a theoretical chance of becoming World Champion.

Previous race: 2000 Belgian Grand Prix	FIA Formula One World Championship; 2000 season	Next race: 2000 United States Grand Prix
Previous race: 1999 Italian Grand Prix	Italian Grand Prix	Next race: 2001 Italian Grand Prix
