= 2000 Japanese Grand Prix =

Formula One motor race held in 2000

Coordinates: 34°50′35″N 136°32′26″E

Race 16 of 17 in the 2000 Formula One World Championship
← Previous race	Next race →

Race details
- Date: 8 October 2000
- Official name: XXVI Fuji Television Japanese Grand Prix
- Location: Suzuka Circuit, Suzuka, Mie, Japan
- Course: Permanent racing facility
- Course length: 5.860 (Note: Other sources give the track distance as 5.864 km (3.644 mi) and a race distance of 310.792 km (193.117 mi).) km (3.641 miles)
- Distance: 53 laps, 310.596 km (192.995 miles)
- Weather: Dry/wet
- Attendance: 318,000

Pole position
Driver	(Germany) Michael Schumacher	Ferrari
- Time: 1:35.825

Fastest lap
Driver	(Finland) Mika Häkkinen	McLaren-Mercedes
- Time: 1:39.189 on lap 26

Podium
First	(Germany) Michael Schumacher	Ferrari
Second	(Finland) Mika Häkkinen	McLaren-Mercedes
Third	(United Kingdom) David Coulthard	McLaren-Mercedes

The 2000 Japanese Grand Prix (formally the XXVI Fuji Television Japanese Grand Prix) was a Formula One motor race held on 8 October 2000, in front of 151,000 people at the Suzuka Circuit in Suzuka, Mie, Japan. It was the 26th Japanese Grand Prix and the 16th and penultimate round of the 2000 Formula One World Championship. Ferrari's Michael Schumacher won the 53-lap race from pole position. McLaren's Mika Häkkinen and David Coulthard finished second and third, respectively. Schumacher's victory confirmed him as the 2000 World Drivers' Champion, as Häkkinen could not overtake Schumacher's championship points total with one race remaining in the season.

Only Michael Schumacher and Häkkinen were in contention for the World Drivers' Championship entering the race, with Schumacher leading by eight championship points. Ferrari led McLaren in the World Constructors Championship by ten championship points. Häkkinen began alongside Michael Schumacher on the grid's first row. Michael Schumacher attempted to defend the lead off the line by moving into Häkkinen's path, but Häkkinen passed Michael Schumacher into the first corner, with Coulthard holding off attempts by Williams driver Ralf Schumacher to get into third. Michael Schumacher closed up to Häkkinen by lap 36 and overtaking him during the second round of pit stops. He maintained his lead over Häkkinen to the end of the race to claim his eighth victory of the season.

Many Formula One individuals praised Michael Schumacher, including former champion Jody Scheckter and Ferrari president Luca di Montezemolo, but was criticised by former Italian president Francesco Cossiga for his behaviour on the podium during the playing of the Italian national anthem. Häkkinen's second-place finish secured him second in the World Drivers' Championship, while Ferrari increased its lead over McLaren in the World Constructors' Championship to thirteen championship points with one race remaining in the season.

== Background ==
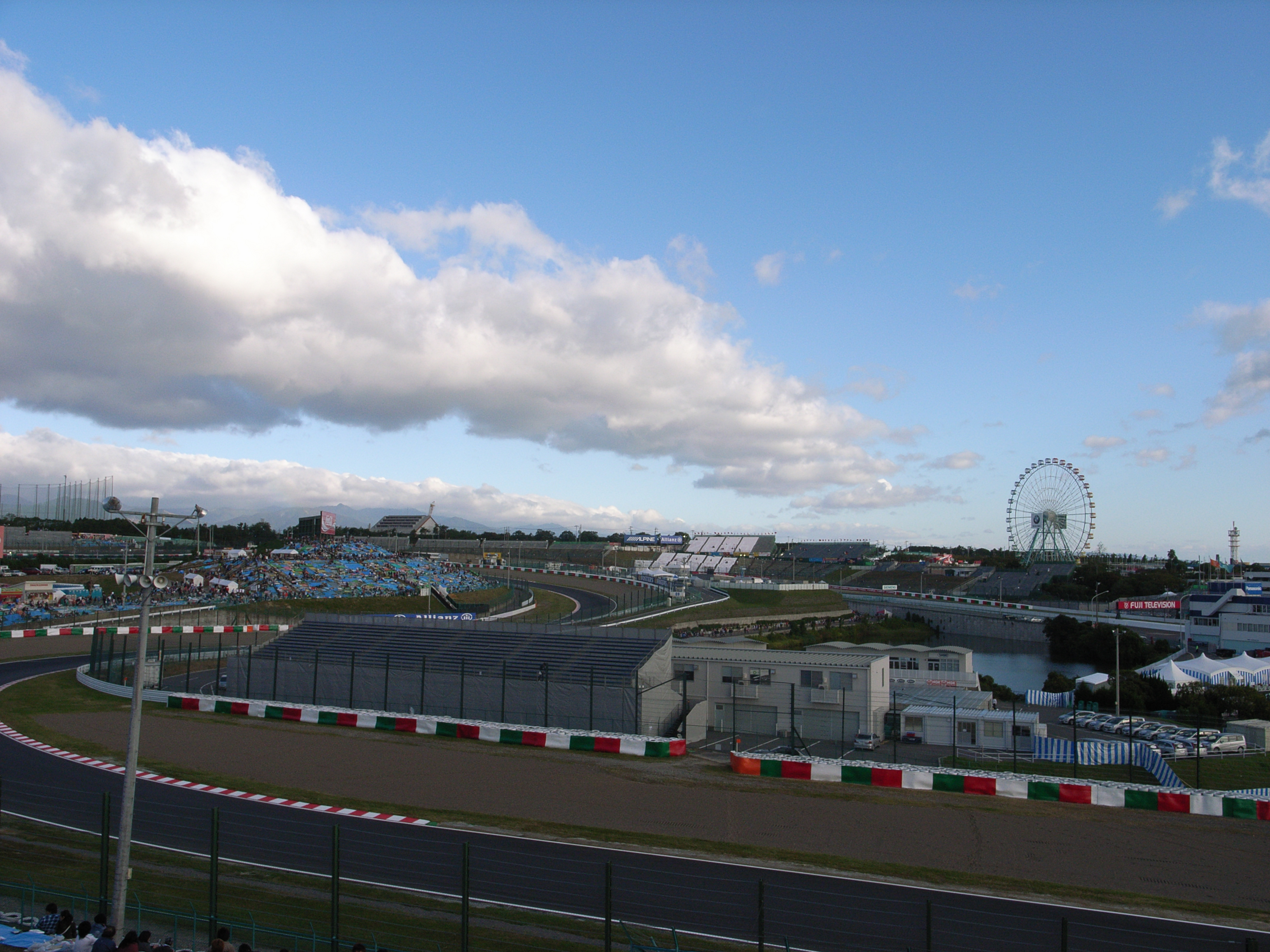
The Suzuka Circuit (pictured in 2006), where the race was held

The 2000 Japanese Grand Prix was held on 8 October 2000 at the 5.860 km (3.641 mi) clockwise figure-of-eight Suzuka Circuit in Suzuka, Mie, Japan, the 16th and penultimate round of the 2000 Formula One World Championship. The event was contested by eleven teams (each representing a different constructor) comprising two drivers, with no changes from the season entry list. Sole tyre supplier Bridgestone sent the Medium dry compound as opposed to two dry compounds as it had one all-season, as well as the intermediate and full wet-weather compounds, to the event. The circuit was altered slightly in preparation for the race. To increase safety, the pit lane entry was moved from the end of the 130R's left-hand corner to the exit of the Casio chicane.

Ferrari's Michael Schumacher led the World Drivers' Championship with 88 championship points before the race, followed by McLaren teammates Mika Häkkinen on 80 and David Coulthard on 63. Ferrari's Rubens Barrichello was fourth with 55 championship points with Williams' Ralf Schumacher fifth with 24 championship points. The remaining two races had a maximum of 20 championship points available, therefore Häkkinen could still win the championship. Michael Schumacher had to win the race regardless of where Häkkinen finished because he would be more than ten championship points ahead of him with one race remaining. Otherwise, Häkkinen could win the Championship by outscoring Schumacher in the final race of the season in Malaysia. Michael Schumacher would win the Championship on win count-back if there was a championship points tie. Ferrari led the World Constructors' Championship with 143 championship points, followed by McLaren and Williams with 133 and 34 championship points, respectively. Jordan were fifth with 17 championship points behind Benetton in fourth with 20.

Häkkinen retired from the preceding United States Grand Prix due to a pneumatic valve failure. With two races left in the season and an eight-point disadvantage after losing the Drivers' Championship lead and 20 championship points available for the final two races, Häkkinen remained optimistic about his title chances: "I know that what happened to me in the last Grand Prix, when I had to retire, can happen to anyone, It could happen to Michael. So I am very optimistic. I have come here prepared and thinking about these two races together. Not one, two." He approached the event similarly to the others. Michael Schumacher having won the two previous races, emphasised the pressure of leading the championship entering Japan: "It hasn't been a relaxing time at all and I still haven't completely got over the jetlag from the States. But I'm prepared to sacrifice this and a lot more to bring the title back to Maranello. And the same can be said of the entire team." Ferrari team principal Jean Todt and former World Champion Jody Scheckter urged Barrichello and Coulthard to race fairly after their teams ordered both drivers to support their teammates in the Championship battle.

Following the United States Grand Prix on September 24, the teams tested at five racing circuits between 26 and 29 September in preparation for the race. McLaren test driver Olivier Panis tested at the Circuit de Nevers Magny-Cours to prepare for Suzuka and work on the 2001 car. Ferrari test driver Luca Badoer spent two days at the Fiorano Circuit evaluating mechanical components and Bridgestone's wet weather tyre compounds on an artificially wet track while Michael Schumacher was at the Mugello Circuit working on car setup on the F1-2000 car. Formula Renault champion Enrique Bernoldi and Kimi Räikkönen setup the Sauber C19 car's aerodynamic package, mechanical settings and weight distribution for the Suzuka circuit at Mugello. Williams spent two days at the Circuito do Estoril testing wet weather tyres and different aerodynamic setups with rookie Jenson Button. Stéphane Sarrazin, Prost's test driver, collected chassis design data for the future AP04 chassis at Magny-Cours. Benetton did not test but its test driver Mark Webber tried developments at the Circuit de Catalunya that were incorporated into their 2001 car.

At the Friday afternoon drivers meeting, Fédération Internationale de l'Automobile (FIA) Race Director Charlie Whiting announced that any potential blocking manoeuvres that interfered with the World Championship battle would result in a driver being shown a waved black and white flag to indicate unsportsmanlike conduct, followed by a black flag to signal disqualification from the race. Any driver found to have violated the new rule might also have faced a three-race ban. This came after Sauber's Norberto Fontana impeded Michael Schumacher's title rival Jacques Villeneuve at the 1997 European Grand Prix. Ralf Schumacher agreed with the penalties. McLaren team principal Ron Dennis, however, was more vocal in his opposition to the new rules, believing they were arbitrary and were against choosing tactics for his team. He was particularly dissatisfied with the appointment of Italian lawyer Roberto Causo (who represented Ferrari at the 1999 Malaysian Grand Prix) as a race steward, believing that any ruling would favour Ferrari.

Some teams had modified their cars for the event, but with only two races left in the season, several teams instead focused on developing the cars that they would enter in the 2001 season. Ferrari introduced a rectangular-shaped front wing, replacing an arrow-shaped front wing. Honda introduced a more powerful version of its V10 engine for Saturday's qualifying and the race. Sauber brought lighter components to lighten their vehicles, while Williams supplied a revised back wing. Williams engine suppliers BMW ran the same engine specification introduced in Belgium.

== Practice ==
Two one-hour sessions on Friday and two 45-minute sessions on Saturday preceded Sunday's race. The Friday morning and afternoon sessions were held in dry, warm weather. Because teams were not permitted to test at Suzuka, several drivers entered the circuit for car checks. Michael Schumacher was the fastest in the first practice session, lapping at 1:38.474 with two minutes remaining, ahead of Häkkinen and Coulthard in second and third. When fourth-placed Barrichello spun at the hairpin between turns ten and eleven and crashed into the perimeter fencing, the session was yellow flagged. Ralf Schumacher was fifth fastest, with Benetton's Giancarlo Fisichella sixth. Jordan's Heinz-Harald Frentzen and Jarno Trulli were seventh and ninth, separated by Jaguar's Eddie Irvine. British American Racing's (BAR) Villeneuve was tenth despite a 130 mph (210 km/h) spin off the circuit at Degner Curve, causing grass to penetrate his radiators.

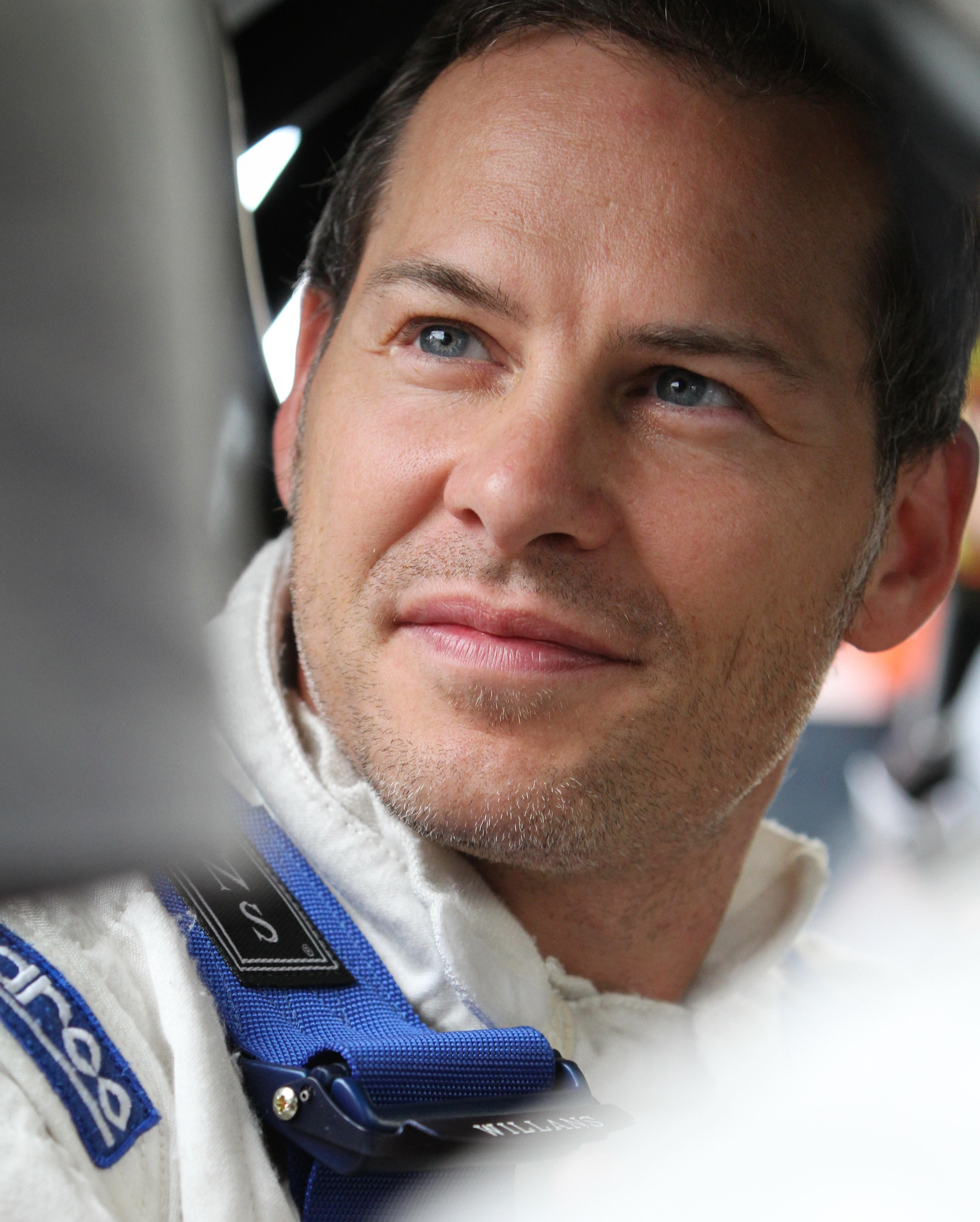
Jacques Villeneuve (pictured in 2010) spun a total of four times during all four free practice sessions.

In the second practice session, Michael Schumacher set the day's fastest lap, a 1:37.728, six-tenths of a second faster than Häkkinen. On his final run, Barrichello struggled to select first gear, but he improved his lap to third fastest. Coulthard, Button, Frentzen, Trulli, Arrows' Pedro de la Rosa, Villeneuve and BAR's Ricardo Zonta were in positions four through ten. Villeneuve had his second spin of the day, when he lost control of his car at Spoon Curve turn on his final lap. He hit the barrier with his car's right-front wheel. While cars were being driven on the track, a magnitude 6.7 earthquake was felt at Suzuka, though no structural damage to the circuit was reported and no one was injured despite the mild alarm.

Saturday morning's practice sessions were held in dry and warm weather. Michael Schumacher had the quickest time in the third practise, a 1:37.176, which was faster than his best time on Friday. Ralf Schumacher was second and Button was fourth. Coulthard, in third, ran wide at the exit of Spoon Curve turn and returned to the course after driving into the gravel. Fisichella set the fifth-fastest lap, ahead of Villeneuve, who spun into the gravel at the hairpin late in practice and had to walk to the pit lane. Barrichello, Irvine, Jaguar's Johnny Herbert and De la Rosa completed the top ten. Ten minutes into practice, the engine in Pedro Diniz's Sauber car failed; smoke and fire billowed from the rear of his car, and a large amount of oil was laid on the track. He returned to the pit lane rather than stop at the side of the track. Some drivers slid on the oil.

With 15 minutes remaining in the last practice session, Häkkinen lapped fastest at 1:37.037, one-tenth of a second faster than Michael Schumacher. Button, third, was happy with his car's performance. Despite another spin into the gravel traps, Barrichello maintained his consistent performance and was fourth-fastest. He was ahead of Ralf Schumacher, who had his fastest lap invalidated after breaching track limits at the chicane when he braked too late with ten minutes left. Coulthard was sixth, two-tenths of a second quicker than Fisichella, who finished seventh. Irvine, Benetton's Alexander Wurz and Villeneuve completed the top ten. Irvine had a throttle system fault and ran wide into the gravel at the Spoon Curve corner. He rejoined the track by following the gravel's perimeter. Villeneuve spun into the gravel trap for the fourth time, but was able to rejoin to the track.

== Qualifying ==
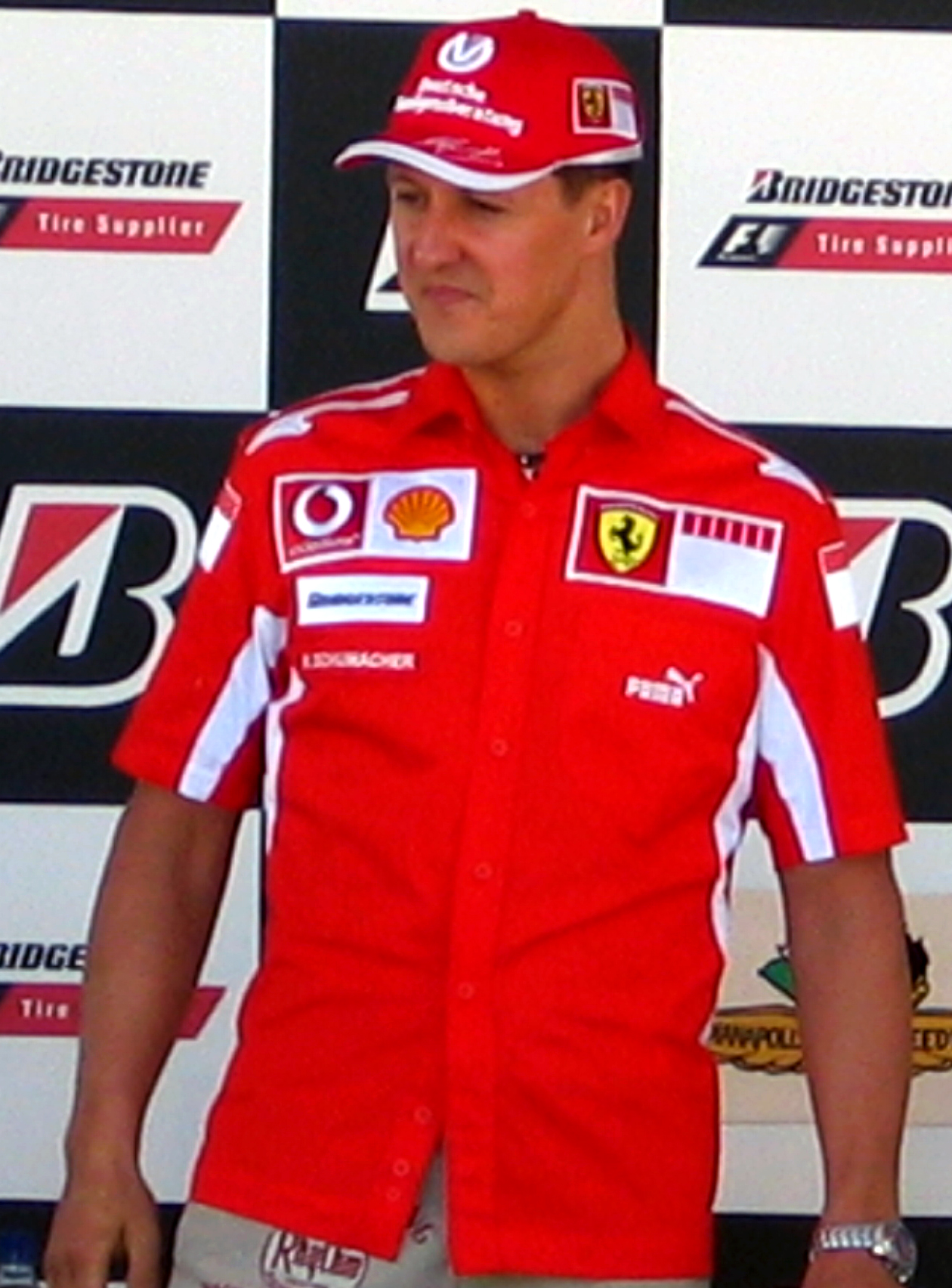
Michael Schumacher became a triple World champion at the penultimate round of the season after a season long battle with Mika Häkkinen to end Ferrari's 21-year driver-championless drought.

During Saturday's one-hour qualifying session, each driver was limited to twelve laps, with the starting order determined by their fastest laps. The 107% rule was in force during this session, which required each driver to set a time within 107% of the fastest lap to qualify for the race. Qualifying was held in dry weather. Michael Schumacher secured his eighth pole position of the season, the 31st of his Formula One career, with a lap of 1:35.825 set with three minutes remaining after Ferrari technical director Ross Brawn sent him into a gap in traffic. Häkkinen, who was nine thousandths of a second slower than Schumacher and battled him for grid position throughout qualifying, joined him on the front row after being slow exiting the final turn, losing him time. Häkkinen's teammate Coulthard qualified third, closing in on the session's quickest two qualifiers. He conceded that despite making some car tweaks, he was not quick enough to fight for pole position. Both Williams drivers qualified on the third row of the grid, with Button in fifth and Ralf Schumacher in sixth. Both drivers had mixed feelings with their performances; Ralf Schumacher was unable to deal with car setup changes. Button's first two timed laps were hampered by Häkkinen and Trulli, and he lapped fastest on his third try. Irvine, seventh, was slow into certain turns and had braking issues. Frentzen, eighth, reported driving a difficult-to-handle car.

Villeneuve, ninth, had excess oversteer and failed to lap faster due to car alterations. Herbert, tenth, felt he could have qualified on the fourth row with a setup adjustment. Wurz, eleventh, missed qualifying for the top ten by nearly two thousands of a second due to a lack of top speed. His teammate Fisichella started 12th after his car lost performance after morning practice. Both Arrows drivers were on the seventh row--De la Rosa was faster than Verstappen--and their cars were hampered by water leaks, electrical and hydraulic issues. Trulli, 15th, struggled with car power steering in high-speed corners and poor car balance. Nick Heidfeld qualified 16th, ahead of Prost teammate Jean Alesi. Zonta, 18th, had reduced qualifying time due to an engine change. Sauber secured the tenth row, with Mika Salo ahead of Diniz, who struggled with traction and understeer. Salo used a spare Sauber vehicle setup for Diniz because his race car had a broken electrical connection. Two of Diniz's fastest qualifying times were disallowed due to him laying oil on the circuit and not stopping in the morning practice sessions. Marc Gené qualified 21st, ahead of Gastón Mazzacane in 22nd place for the two Minardi drivers. Due to a sudden rise in gear oil temperature, Gené drove the spare Minardi car, and Mazzacane made an error within the first part of his lap.

=== Qualifying classification ===
Pos	No	Driver	Constructor	Time	Gap
1	3	(Germany) Michael Schumacher	Ferrari	1:35.825	—
2	1	(Finland) Mika Häkkinen	McLaren-Mercedes	1:35.834	+0.009
3	2	(United Kingdom) David Coulthard	McLaren-Mercedes	1:36.236	+0.411
4	4	(Brazil) Rubens Barrichello	Ferrari	1:36.330	+0.505
5	10	(United Kingdom) Jenson Button	Williams-BMW	1:36.628	+0.803
6	9	(Germany) Ralf Schumacher	Williams-BMW	1:36.788	+0.963
7	7	(United Kingdom) Eddie Irvine	Jaguar-Cosworth	1:36.899	+1.074
8	5	(Germany) Heinz-Harald Frentzen	Jordan-Mugen-Honda	1:37.243	+1.418
9	22	(Canada) Jacques Villeneuve	BAR-Honda	1:37.267	+1.442
10	8	(United Kingdom) Johnny Herbert	Jaguar-Cosworth	1:37.329	+1.504
11	12	(Austria) Alexander Wurz	Benetton-Playlife	1:37.348	+1.523
12	11	(Italy) Giancarlo Fisichella	Benetton-Playlife	1:37.479	+1.654
13	18	(Spain) Pedro de la Rosa	Arrows-Supertec	1:37.652	+1.827
14	19	(Netherlands) Jos Verstappen	Arrows-Supertec	1:37.674	+1.849
15	6	(Italy) Jarno Trulli	Jordan-Mugen-Honda	1:37.679	+1.854
16	15	(Germany) Nick Heidfeld	Prost-Peugeot	1:38.141	+2.316
17	14	(France) Jean Alesi	Prost-Peugeot	1:38.209	+2.384
18	23	(Brazil) Ricardo Zonta	BAR-Honda	1:38.269	+2.444
19	17	(Finland) Mika Salo	Sauber-Petronas	1:38.490	+2.665
20	16	(Brazil) Pedro Diniz	Sauber-Petronas	1:38.576	+2.751
21	20	(Spain) Marc Gené	Minardi-Fondmetal	1:39.972	+4.147
22	21	(Argentina) Gastón Mazzacane	Minardi-Fondmetal	1:40.462	+4.637
107% time: 1:42.533

== Warm-up ==
The drivers took to the track at 10:00 Japan Standard Time (UTC +9) for a 30-minute warm-up session. It was held in overcast weather, with a few drops of rain falling before the session began. This rendered the circuit damp, but it dried fast, and teams switched from wet to dry compound tyres. As competitors practised their starts, teams fine-tuned their cars' handling while running high fuel loads. Michael Schumacher set the quickest overall lap of 1:38.005 on his final fast attempt. His teammate Barrichello finished third in the other Ferrari. McLaren drivers separated them—Häkkinen was second and Coulthard was fourth. Button set the fifth-fastest lap. Mazzacane lost control of his car in the final curve of the esses behind the pit lane with ten minutes left in warm-up, sustaining heavy car damage against the barrier.

== Race ==
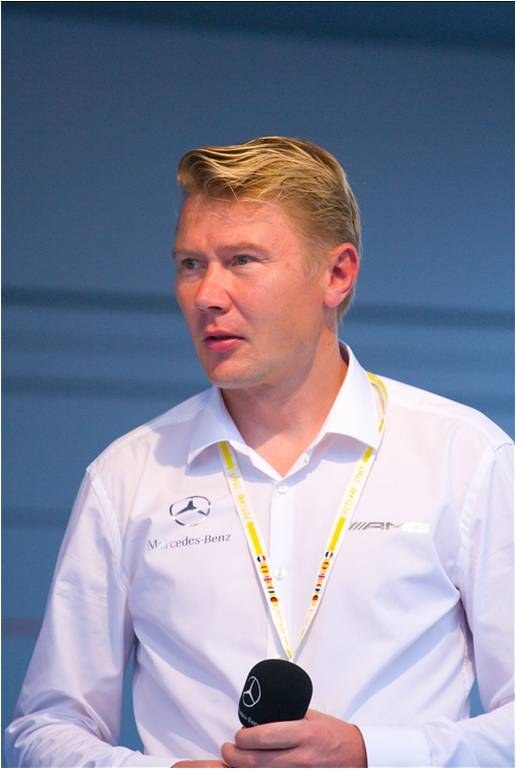
Mika Häkkinen (pictured in 2009) finished second and conceded the Drivers' Championship to Michael Schumacher.

The 53-lap race ran over 310.596 km (192.995 mi) before approximately 151,000 people from 14:30 local time. The weather was dry and overcast for the race; forecasters predicted rain during the event. The air temperature was at 22 °C (72 °F) and the track temperature at 23 °C (73 °F). During the final parade lap, Häkkinen's car developed a hydraulic system leak, causing oil to drip out of an overflow tank and hit the engine and emit smoke but was able to start. Frentzen began the race in Jordan's spare monocoque. When the lights went out to start the race, extra track grip allowed Häkkinen to accelerate faster than Michael Schumacher off the line. He held off Schumacher's attempts to maintain the lead by veering right towards the McLaren car in an attempt to block his path into the first corner. Michael Schumacher's manoeuvre created some action behind the leading two drivers on the approach into the first corner, as Ralf Schumacher overtook Barrichello and Coulthard resisted Schumacher's attempts to pass for third. Verstappen advanced from 14th to ninth at the end of the first lap, while Fisichella's anti-stall system activated, making a slow getaway and dropping eight positions.

At the completion of lap one, Häkkinen led Michael Schumacher by eight-tenths of a second, followed by Coulthard, Ralf Schumacher, Irvine, Barrichello and Button (who had an overheating clutch). Häkkinen set the race's fastest lap on lap two and began to maintain the gap on Michael Schumacher as both drivers drew away from the rest of the field. A light drizzle fell on the circuit on the fourth lap, but it was not heavy enough to effect the race. On lap seven, Villeneuve overtook Herbert for eighth place, while Trulli passed his teammate Frentzen from 11th. Verstappen coasted over the circuit with electronic gearbox issues and was pushed into the garage, becoming the race's first retirement on lap ten. Diniz took his first pit stop on lap 13, starting the first round of pit stops. At the front, Häkkinen extended his lead over Michael Schumacher to two seconds, who was ten seconds ahead of Coulthard in third. Ralf Schumacher was 8.8 seconds behind Coulthard but pulling away from Irvine in fifth.

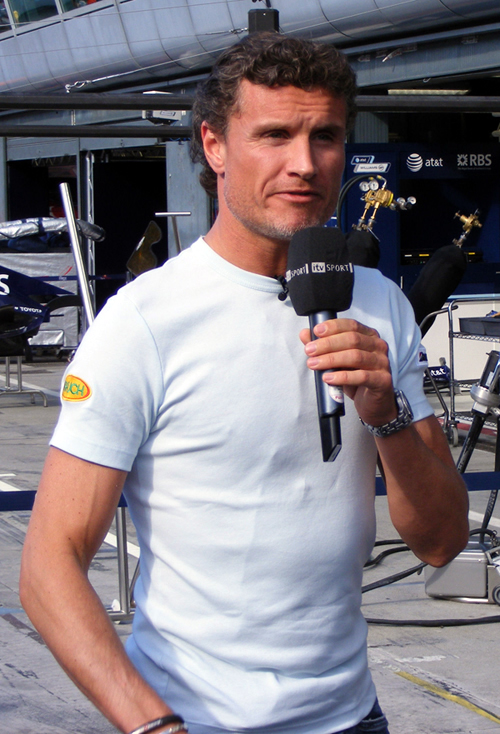
David Coulthard (pictured in 2007) took third for McLaren.

Further back, Trulli made a pit stop from tenth on lap 17 due to him being fuelled light to gain track position. He fell to 18th. Irvine was the first of the front runners to make a pit stop on the following lap, emerging behind Frentzen. Wurz, Herbert, Salo, and Heidfeld all made pit stops on lap 19, while Trulli lost time after going off the circuit. Ralf Schumacher, Villeneuve, Frentzen, De la Rosa, and Fisichella made their first pit stops on lap 20. Barrichello and Button made pit stops on the next lap and rejoined ahead of Irvine. Alesi retired from the race on lap 21 due to an engine failure that spilled oil on the track, and spun on his own oil in either turns four or five. Häkkinen's team requested that he make a pit stop earlier than planned on lap 22. Michael Schumacher led one lap before Brawn called him into the pit lane for extra fuel on lap 23. He fell behind Häkkinen since his pit stop was slightly longer. Coulthard led for one lap until making his first pit stop on lap 24, handing the lead to teammate Häkkinen. On the same lap, Villeneuve passed Irvine into turn 16 for eighth.

Every driver had made pit stops by the end of lap 25. Häkkinen was first, followed by Michael Schumacher, Coulthard, Barrichello, Ralf Schumacher, and Button. Häkkinen set a new fastest lap of the race on lap 26, a 1:39.189, extending his lead over Michael Schumacher to 2.9 seconds; Schumacher remained close behind Häkkinen despite carrying more fuel in his car. Trulli became the first driver to make a second pit stop on lap 28. Light rain began to fall on lap 30 and the track started to become slippery; however it was not heavy enough to switch from dry tyres to wet-weather tyres. After Häkkinen was slowed by De la Rosa's car in the chicane on the same lap, the gap between him and Michael Schumacher fell by one second. Lap times slowed after that as the track became slippery. Ralf Schumacher lost sixth to teammate Button after an error on the same lap, while Frentzen retired at the entry of First Curve due to a hydraulic pump failure that caused his gearbox to fail. Michael Schumacher closed to 0.7 seconds behind Häkkinen by lap 31, although he narrowly avoided hitting Zonta who went off the racing line to allow him past on the entry to the chicane two laps later. Further back, Heidfeld overtook Trulli for 13th on lap 34.

The second round of pit stops began on the same lap when Irvine made a pit stop. Häkkinen made his second stop on lap 37 to avoid the battling Jaguars ahead of him, exiting 25.8 seconds behind Michael Schumacher but ahead of Coulthard. Michael Schumacher began immediately pulling away from Häkkinen, using the time outside of aerodynamic turbulence and light fuel load to do so; he radioed Brawn that he was nearing slower vehicles and asked whether he should make his last pit stop earlier than planned. Brawn told Michael Schumacher to stay on the track for the time being. Coulthard, Barrichello and Button remained in third, fourth and fifth espectively, during their second stops on lap 38 and 39. Wurz retired after spinning sideways exiting the chicane on lap 40. Michael Schumacher missed Wurz's stationary vehicle, and lost time manoeuvring past it. Wurz then reversed backwards as Häkkinen went by. Schumacher made his final pit stop on the same lap, emerging 4.1 seconds in front of Häkkinen, with his stop being 1.2 seconds faster than Häkkinen's. He had gained five seconds on Häkkinen despite encountering the two Jaguars and Wurz because of the undercut being powerful as a result of the contrast in fuel loads. Ralf Schumacher became the race's sixth retirement when he lost control of his car's rear mounting a kerb and spun into the gravel trap while attempting to lap Gené at turn two on lap 42. This promoted Villeneuve to the final points-paying position of sixth. Heidfeld became the final driver to make a scheduled pit stop on the same lap.

At the conclusion of lap 42, with the scheduled pit stops completed, the top six drivers were Michael Schumacher, Häkkinen, Coulthard, Barrichello, Button, and Villeneuve. On lap 43, Heidfeld retired due to a left-front suspension component failure, while De la Rosa passed Fisichella for 13th. Fisichella was forced onto the gravel to avoid contact. Three laps later, the rain intensified slightly, and both Michael Schumacher and Häkkinen became more circumspect. De la Rosa overtook Trulli during the 48th lap. Gené retired with a failed engine at the hairpin on the same lap. Although Häkkinen closed the gap over the final 14 laps, Michael Schumacher maintained the lead to win his eighth race of the 2000 season and 43rd of his career, in a time of 1'29:53.435, at an average speed of 207.316 km/h (128.820 mph). Michael Schumacher won the 2000 Drivers' Championship as Häkkinen could not catch his championship points total in the one remaining race. He also became Ferrari's first World Drivers' Champion since Jody Scheckter in 1979. Häkkinen skidded on a set of tyres he could not generate heat into and finished second, 1.8 seconds behind, ahead of teammate Coulthard in third with Barrichello fourth. Button finished fifth and was gaining on Barrichello by the finish. Villeneuve completed the points scorers in sixth. Herbert, Irvine, Zonta, Salo, Diniz, De la Rosa, Trulli, Fisichella and Mazzacane were the final classified finishers.

=== Post-race ===
The top three drivers appeared on the podium to collect their trophies and in the subsequent press conference. Michael Schumacher revealed that he was careful when the track became slippery owing to rain during the second stint. He also added that his team made adjustments during the first stop, which contributed to his fast pace. Häkkinen congratulated Michael Schumacher on winning the Drivers' Championship and said that, while he was naturally disappointed, "to be a good winner, sometimes you have to be a good loser." He also confessed that Ferrari's tactics cost him a chance at victory and admitted that Schumacher had an advantage after his second pit stop. Coulthard described his race as "quiet" because of the lack of action he encountered. He also admitted that he struggled to handle his car in the wet.

Michael Schumacher began celebrating his championship win, and it was well received by both the Formula One paddock and the German and Italian press. German national newspaper Die Welt said: "A dream has been fulfilled and it will have far-reaching consequences. Ferrari and Formula One are alive again in this season and a new monument has been created ...Hard work and self-sacrifice have been rewarded." Across Italy, events were held to celebrate Michael Schumacher's championship victory. Candido Cannavò, director of the Italian sports newspaper La Gazzetta dello Sport described the moment as: "On the dawn of a luminous autumn Sunday Ferrari reconciled itself with history."

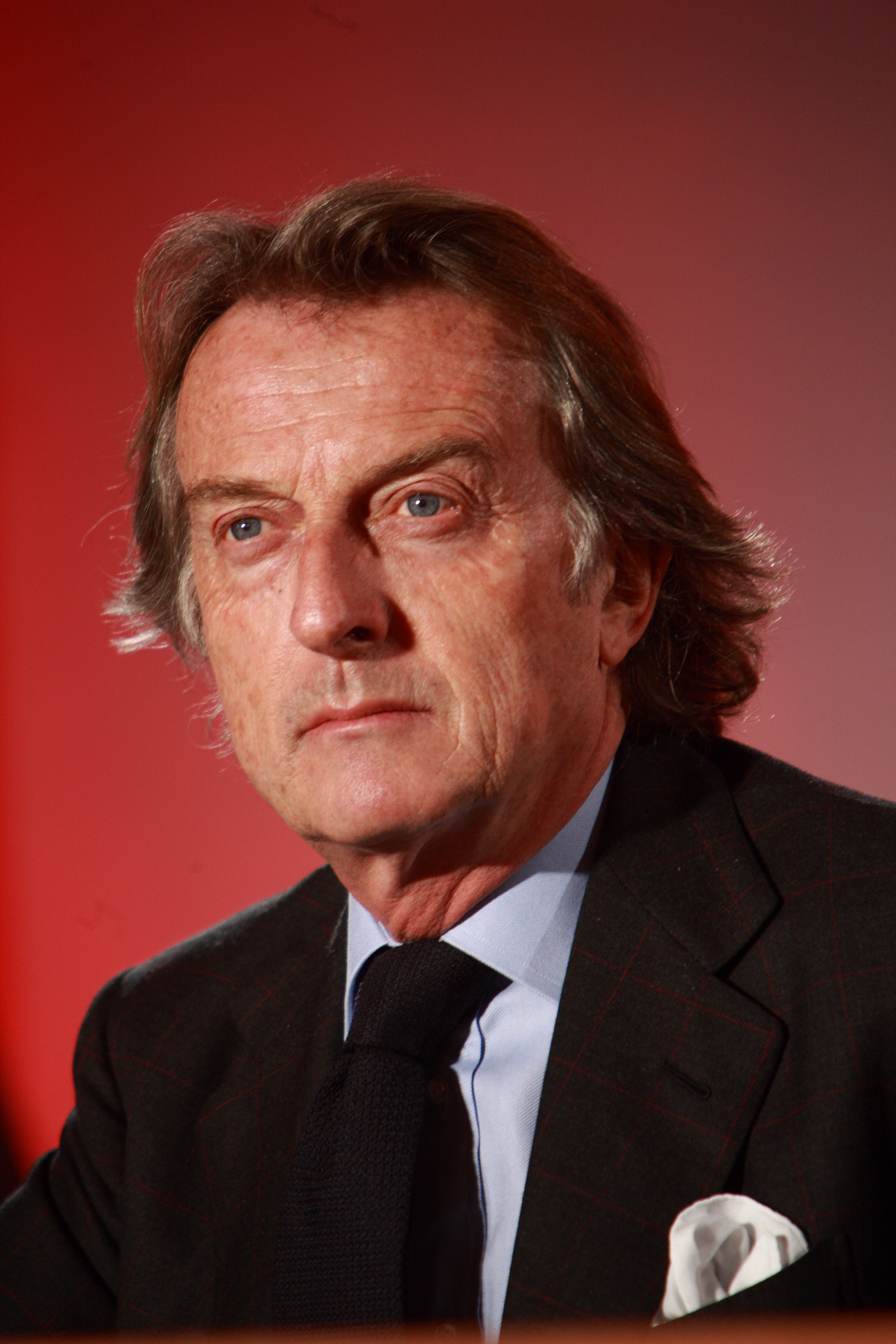
Luca di Montezemolo (pictured in 2008) commended Michael Schumacher's World Championship win

Ferrari president Luca di Montezemolo described Michael Schumacher's title victory as the "most beautiful day of my life". He also thanked the Ferrari team, their worldwide fan base, Ferrari's majority owner FIAT, and the team's sponsors and suppliers for their continued support. Scheckter praised both Ferrari and Michael Schumacher, but expressed disappointment at losing his status as Ferrari's last World Champion. Todt said Ferrari would not be fully satisfied until they had won the World Constructors' Championship: "We need three points for the constructors' title and we won't let go. But let's not worry about the future right now. Let's enjoy the present for at least five minutes." However, former Italian President Francesco Cossiga criticised Michael Schumacher's behaviour during the Italian National Anthem, where the German traditionally imitated a conductor when it was played. Michael Schumacher apologised if his behaviour was seen as disrespectful and that he respected the national anthem.

Off track, the argument over the new race rules and the inclusion of lawyer Roberto Causo as a race steward was renewed. FIA president Max Mosley published a letter to Ron Dennis dated 19 October accusing him of tarnishing Formula One with his recent statements on the issues. Mosley also backed Whiting's proposal for the use flags to eliminate unsportsmanlike racing. Dennis apologised for his statements, saying he did not mean to bring Formula One into disrepute or to disrespect Causo. "It certainly has not ever been my intention to damage a sport to which I have devoted most of my working life." he said. Williams technical director Patrick Head commended Button's performance in the changing conditions that saw him finish fifth, saying: "He drove an absolutely brilliant, very mature race and thoroughly deserved fifth position."

As a result of the race, Michael Schumacher won the World Drivers' Championship with a 12-point lead over Häkkinen, who was confirmed as the Championship runner-up. Coulthard maintained third with 67 championship points, nine ahead of Barrichello and 43 ahead of Ralf Schumacher. Ferrari increased their lead over McLaren in the World Constructors' Championship to 13 championship points and the title would be decided in Malaysia. Williams increased its gap over Benetton in fourth place by 16 championship points, while BAR passed Jordan to move into fifth place with 18 championship points with one race of the season remaining.

=== Race classification ===
Drivers who scored championship points are denoted in bold.

Pos	No	Driver	Constructor	Laps	Time/Retired	Grid	Points
1	3	(Germany) **Michael Schumacher**	**Ferrari**	53	1:29:53.435	1	10
2	1	(Finland) **Mika Häkkinen**	**McLaren-Mercedes**	53	+1.837	2	6
3	2	(United Kingdom) **David Coulthard**	**McLaren-Mercedes**	53	+1:09.914	3	4
4	4	(Brazil) **Rubens Barrichello**	**Ferrari**	53	+1:19.191	4	3
5	10	(United Kingdom) **Jenson Button**	**Williams-BMW**	53	+1:25.694	5	2
6	22	(Canada) **Jacques Villeneuve**	**BAR-Honda**	52	+1 Lap	9	1
7	8	(United Kingdom) Johnny Herbert	Jaguar-Cosworth	52	+1 Lap	10	
8	7	(United Kingdom) Eddie Irvine	Jaguar-Cosworth	52	+1 Lap	7	
9	23	(Brazil) Ricardo Zonta	BAR-Honda	52	+1 Lap	18	
10	17	(Finland) Mika Salo	Sauber-Petronas	52	+1 Lap	19	
11	16	(Brazil) Pedro Diniz	Sauber-Petronas	52	+1 Lap	20	
12	18	(Spain) Pedro de la Rosa	Arrows-Supertec	52	+1 Lap	13	
13	6	(Italy) Jarno Trulli	Jordan-Mugen-Honda	52	+1 Lap	15	
14	11	(Italy) Giancarlo Fisichella	Benetton-Playlife	52	+1 Lap	12	
15	21	(Argentina) Gastón Mazzacane	Minardi-Fondmetal	51	+2 Laps	22	
Ret	20	(Spain) Marc Gené	Minardi-Fondmetal	46	Engine	21	
Ret	9	(Germany) Ralf Schumacher	Williams-BMW	41	Spun off	6	
Ret	15	(Germany) Nick Heidfeld	Prost-Peugeot	41	Suspension	16	
Ret	12	(Austria) Alexander Wurz	Benetton-Playlife	37	Spun off	11	
Ret	5	(Germany) Heinz-Harald Frentzen	Jordan-Mugen-Honda	29	Hydraulics	8	
Ret	14	(France) Jean Alesi	Prost-Peugeot	19	Engine/Spun off	17	
Ret	19	(Netherlands) Jos Verstappen	Arrows-Supertec	9	Electrical	14	

== Championship standings after the race ==
Drivers' Championship standings

+/–	Pos	Driver	Points
	1	(Germany) Michael Schumacher*	98
	2	(Finland) Mika Häkkinen	86
	3	(United Kingdom) David Coulthard	67
	4	(Brazil) Rubens Barrichello	58
	5	(Germany) Ralf Schumacher	24

Constructors' Championship standings

+/–	Pos	Constructor	Points
	1	(Italy) Ferrari*	156
	2	(United Kingdom) McLaren-Mercedes	143
	3	(United Kingdom) Williams-BMW	36
	4	(Italy) Benetton-Playlife	20
1	5	(United Kingdom) BAR-Honda	18
Sources:

- Note: Only the top five positions are included for both sets of standings.
- Bold text and an asterisk indicates the 2000 World Champions.

== Notes ==
Previous race: 2000 United States Grand Prix	FIA Formula One World Championship; 2000 season	Next race: 2000 Malaysian Grand Prix
Previous race: 1999 Japanese Grand Prix	Japanese Grand Prix	Next race: 2001 Japanese Grand Prix
