= 2000 United States Grand Prix =

Coordinates: 39°47′42″N 86°14′05″W

Race 15 of 17 in the 2000 Formula One World Championship
← Previous race	Next race →

Race details
- Date: September 24, 2000
- Official name: 2000 SAP United States Grand Prix
- Location: Indianapolis Motor Speedway, Speedway, Indiana
- Course: Permanent racing facility
- Course length: 4.192 km (2.605 miles)
- Distance: 73 laps, 306.016 km (190.150 miles)
- Weather: Cloudy, drying, Air 12 °C (54 °F); Track 14 °C (57 °F)
- Attendance: 250,000

Pole position
Driver	(Germany) Michael Schumacher	Ferrari
- Time: 1:14.266

Fastest lap
Driver	(United Kingdom) David Coulthard	McLaren-Mercedes
- Time: 1:14.711 on lap 40

Podium
First	(Germany) Michael Schumacher	Ferrari
Second	(Brazil) Rubens Barrichello	Ferrari
Third	(Germany) Heinz-Harald Frentzen	Jordan-Mugen-Honda

The 2000 United States Grand Prix (formally the 2000 SAP United States Grand Prix) was a Formula One motor race held on September 24, 2000, at Indianapolis Motor Speedway in Speedway, Indiana before 250,000 spectators. It was the 15th round of the 2000 Formula One World Championship and Indianapolis held its first United States Grand Prix. Ferrari driver Michael Schumacher won the 73-lap race from pole position. His teammate Rubens Barrichello finished second with Jordan's Heinz-Harald Frentzen third.

Before the race, McLaren's Mika Häkkinen led Michael Schumacher by two championship points in the World Drivers' Championship while McLaren led Ferrari by four championship points in the World Constructors' Championship. Michael Schumacher took pole position by setting the best lap in the one-hour qualifying session. McLaren's David Coulthard started second, with Michael Schumacher. However, Coulthard had to serve a ten-second stop-go penalty on lap eight because he jumped the start. Häkkinen started third, but retired on lap 26 with a blown engine due to a pneumatic valve system failure. Michael Schumacher thus had an uncontested lead after passing Coulthard on lap seven, and despite losing control of his Ferrari in the final five circuits of the race, he went on to win his seventh race of the season and 42nd overall. Barrichello finished second, 12.1 seconds behind, and Frentzen finished third, holding off British American Racing's Jacques Villeneuve in the final laps.

Michael Schumacher retook the lead in the World Drivers' Championship by eight championship points over Häkkinen following the race. Coulthard's fifth-place finish in the Grand Prix eliminated any mathematical chance of winning the Drivers' Championship, reducing his advantage over fourth-placed Barrichello to eight championship points. Ferrari retook the World Constructors' Championship lead from McLaren, establishing a ten-point lead with two races left in the season.

== Background ==
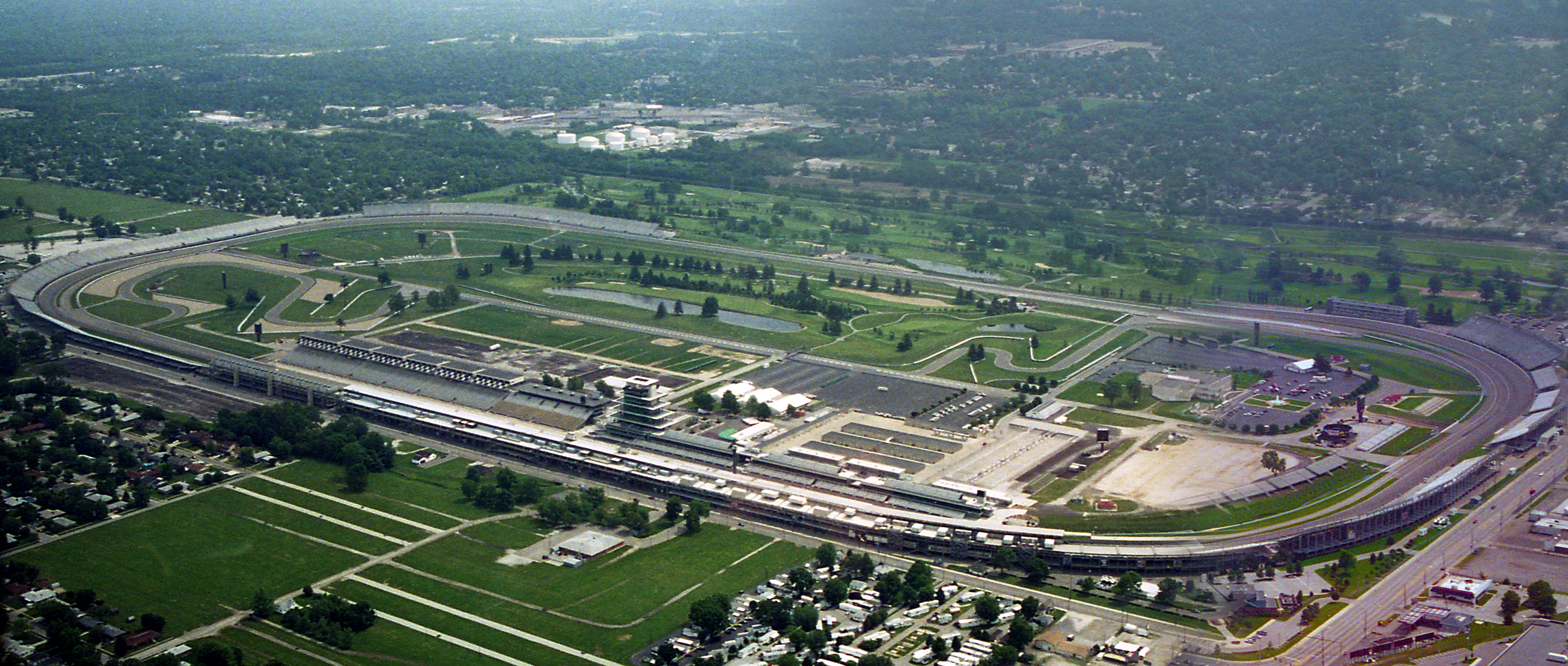
The Indianapolis Motor Speedway, where the race was held

The 2000 United States Grand Prix, officially the SAP United States Grand Prix, was the 15th race of 17 in the 2000 Formula One World Championship. Held at the 4.192 km (2.605 mi) clockwise Indianapolis Motor Speedway (IMS) road course on 24 September 2000, it was the first Formula One World Championship event staged in Indianapolis since the Indianapolis 500 was part of the World Championship from 1950 to 1960. The event was held under the auspices of the United States Auto Club (USAC), the Fédération Internationale de l'Automobile's (FIA; Formula One's governing body) member for the United States, and the Porsche Supercup and the Ferrari Challenge series held support races during the weekend. There were eleven teams of two drivers (each representing a different constructor), and all but one had never raced at Indianapolis, with no changes to the season entry list.

The event marked the United States' return to Formula One after a hiatus since 1991. It was ended because of low attendance at its old venue on the streets of Phoenix, Arizona and it was replaced by the South African Grand Prix in the 1992 season. It was reintroduced in December 1998 after IMS president Tony George's seven-year campaign. The road circuit was built between 2 December 1998 and 10 September 2000, ending two weeks before the Grand Prix. To celebrate the race's return, Jaguar drivers Eddie Irvine and Johnny Herbert did a demonstration lap in a Jaguar R1 and a Taxicab along Broadway in New York City on Tuesday afternoon.

Going into the race, McLaren driver Mika Häkkinen led the World Drivers' Championship with 80 championship points, ahead of Ferrari's Michael Schumacher on 78 championship points, Häkkinen's teammate David Coulthard on 61 championship points, Ferrari's Rubens Barrichello on 49 championship points and Williams' Ralf Schumacher on 24 championship points. McLaren led the World Constructors' Championship with 131 championship points, four ahead of Ferrari. Williams were third with 34 championship points, Benetton fourth on 20 and Jordan fifth with 17.

Following the Italian Grand Prix on 10 September, the teams largely tested aerodynamics, chassis setups and a new tyre compound from Bridgestone at on European racing circuits between 11 and 15 September to prepare for the race. Ferrari, McLaren and Sauber tested at the Mugello Circuit with one day moved to let marshals attend the funeral of fire marshal Paolo Ghislimberti, who died during the race in Italy. Olivier Panis, McLaren's test driver, led on the first day, ahead of Sauber's Pedro Diniz. Panis remained fastest on the second and final days. Williams and Benetton tested at the Autódromo do Estoril circuit, with Ralf Schumacher setting fastest laps on the first and second days, and Benetton's test driver Mark Webber leading on the third day. Jaguar and British American Racing (BAR) tested for two days at the Silverstone Circuit, led by BAR's test driver Darren Manning and Jaguar's test driver Luciano Burti. Luca Badoer, Ferrari's test driver, tested aerodynamic and mechanical components and shook down four F1-2000 cars at Ferrari's private Fiorano Circuit. Minardi tested with drivers Matteo Bobbi and Giorgio Vinella at Vairano while the Arrows and Prost teams did no testing and instead readied their cars at their respective factories for the race at Indianapolis.

At the previous race in Italy, Häkkinen's lead over Michael Schumacher was reduced to two points after Schumacher won and Häkkinen finished second. Häkkinen had won three of the previous five races to Michael Schumacher's one. Bookmakers put both drivers as joint favourites to win the race. With three races left in the season, Häkkinen believed that the remaining races, including the United States Grand Prix, were equally vital, and that the championship battle may last until the season-ending Malaysian Grand Prix. Michael Schumacher stated that Ferrari's dominance shifted to McLaren and vice versa because their cars and drivers were evenly matched, and that winning at Indianapolis would not be more difficult than at any other track, despite drivers' unfamiliarity with the layout. Coulthard was told by McLaren team owner Ron Dennis to help Häkkinen win the championship, saying, "I'm now 19 points behind and although there are still 30 to be won and theoretically there's a chance I might win the title, with just three races left it makes no sense for me to be taking points away from Mika only to allow Michael to win the championship. We will just not let that happen." Barrichello spoke with his team Ferrari and said his job was to help his teammate and hinder McLaren, "The objectives are clear. We have to tighten ourselves around Michael and help bring the title back in Italy after 21 years of absence."

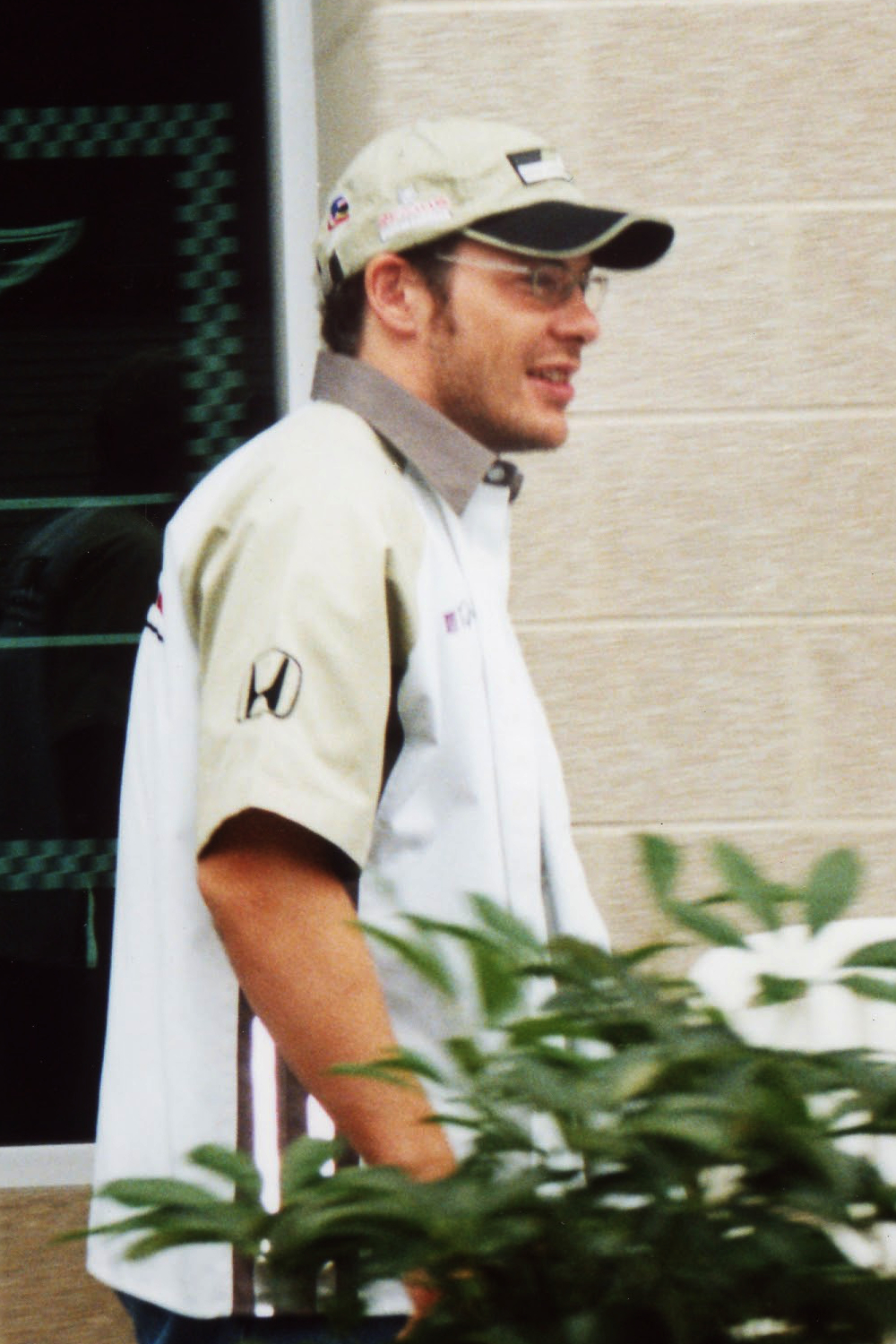
Jacques Villeneuve (pictured in 2002) was vocally critical of the circuit.

The track garnered largely excellent feedback, but most drivers were disappointed by the lack of challenge on the banked turn 13. Häkkinen called the track "great, really enjoyable to drive and quite difficult in some parts", and Michael Schumacher said he did not find it hard to adapt to the circuit. Willams' Jenson Button described the track as a "great circuit". Irvine was surprised by its layout, "It has a good mix of high speed and tight turns. It's tricky and tight – a lot of fun." However, BAR's Jacques Villeneuve was critical, claiming that it would be "very difficult to get a good lap" and found the infield section "very slow". Sauber's Mika Salo disliked the first three hairpins but was satisfied with the rest of the circuit. 1978 World Champion Mario Andretti tested a car on the track and said it "keeps your attention and, believe it or not, it's got a good rhythm. It's the kind of course that you start feeling good about as you get more laps. It invites you to shave all the little things and improve your way." Concerns over a driver error leading to a collision at turn 13 prompted the relocation of the pit lane entry line.

Tyre supplier Bridgestone brought the Hard and the Extra Hard dry compound tyres to the event. Bridgestone created the extra hard tyre compound to help drivers cope with the additional demands of the Indianapolis road course. It advised teams to increase air pressures to withstand the higher cornering load through the final two corners after concerns were raised about a mechanical failure in turn 13 with a concrete barrier lining it following Ghisliberti's death. The company and the FIA agreed to provide teams with two extra sets of tyres for Friday's two free practice sessions in order to collect additional data and ensure that drivers were better acclimatised to the circuit.

Teams concentrated on improving their car setups for the Indianapolis track, as well as reviewing suspension loads because cars would be stressed going through the banking. The Williams team brought a new front wing and a Ferrari-inspired sweep main profile. Arrows' car used a low-downforce layout similar to that seen at the Italian Grand Prix to gain speed on the main straight. Sauber and Williams used similar designs, but most teams eventually settled on a compromise configuration seen at the Belgian Grand Prix.

== Practice ==
There were four practice sessions preceding Sunday's race, two one-hour sessions on Friday and two 45-minute sessions on Saturday. It was warm and dry for the first practice session. All drivers entered the circuit to familiarise themselves with it, with lap times gradually decreasing, which were around two seconds slower than predicted by computer simulations. Michael Schumacher led early in the first practice session, with the quickest time of 1:14.927 seconds, ahead of teammate Barrichello. Häkkinen was third although his car's gearbox was changed. Button, Villeneuve, Benetton's Alexander Wurz, the Jordan duo of Trulli and Heinz-Harald Frentzen, Irvine and Prost's Nick Heidfeld were in fourth through tenth. After ten minutes, an electrical fault prevented Coulthard from establishing a fast lap time as marshals pulled him onto the circuit from the pit lane entry, preventing him from participating in the rest of practice under series regulations. Giancarlo Fisichella removed his Benetton's left-front wheel in a crash at the turn 11 tyre barrier. Ralf Schumacher slowed on course with a front-left wheel bearing failure.

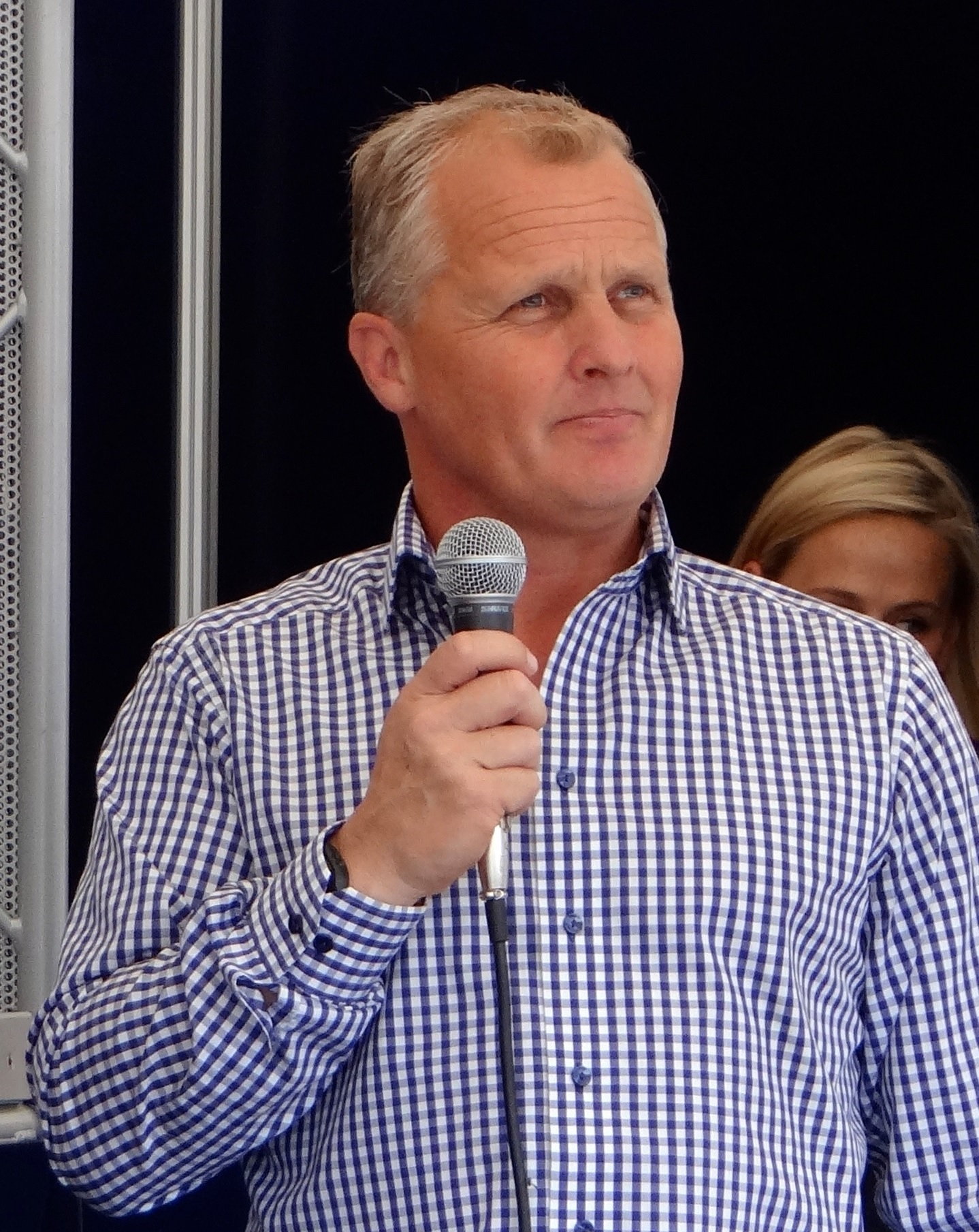
Johnny Herbert (pictured in 2014) was one of the drivers who crashed during the Friday practice sessions.

It remained sunny for the second session, during which drivers experimented with car setups as teams became more familiar with the track. Coulthard set the day's fastest lap at 1:14.561, one tenth of a second faster than teammate Häkkinen 27 minutes in. Michael Schumacher and Barrichello fell to third and fourth fastest, respectively, after failing to better their lap times, even though both drivers expressed satisfaction with their performance. Frentzen, Ralf Schumacher, Trulli, Button, Minardi's Marc Gené and Villeneuve followed in the top ten. Herbert crashed, losing control of his Jaguar when braking and veering left into the outside turn one tyre barrier, damaging his car's left-rear wheel and ending his practice early. His car went down an escape road and marshals moved him off the circuit. Jean Alesi lost control of his Prost car at turn four, getting stuck in a gravel trap near the barriers.

The Saturday morning sessions were run in cloudy conditions on a damp track with patches of standing water from overnight rain, resulting in minimal grip and some drivers going off the circuit. Warm weather improved conditions gradually throughout practice, but lap times were generally slower than the previous day. Häkkinen set the third session's fastest lap, a 1:15.802; Coulthard was third. Button ran quicker and was second. Both Ferrari drivers were fourth and fifth–Barrichello ahead of Michael Schumacher. Fisichella, Frentzen, Ralf Schumacher, Verstappen and Diniz followed in the top ten. Frentzen, Ralf Schumacher, and Wurz all left the track at various points in the session, but all three were able to resume driving.

As the course dried out during the last practice session, drivers began to lose their vehicle balances. Both Ferraris maintained their fast performance; Michael Schumacher was the fastest driver, with a lap of 1:14.804. Barrichello was second. Button separated the McLaren drivers—Coulthard in third and Häkkinen in fifth—who remained fast. Frentzen, sixth, found it a struggle to adapt to the changing conditions. Fisichella, Villeneuve, Ralf Schumacher and Trulli made up positions seven through ten. During the session, Gené and Michael Schumacher lost control of their vehicles and ran off the track, although both were able to continue driving. A passing car dislodged part of a track marking, which a marshal removed from the circuit.

== Qualifying ==
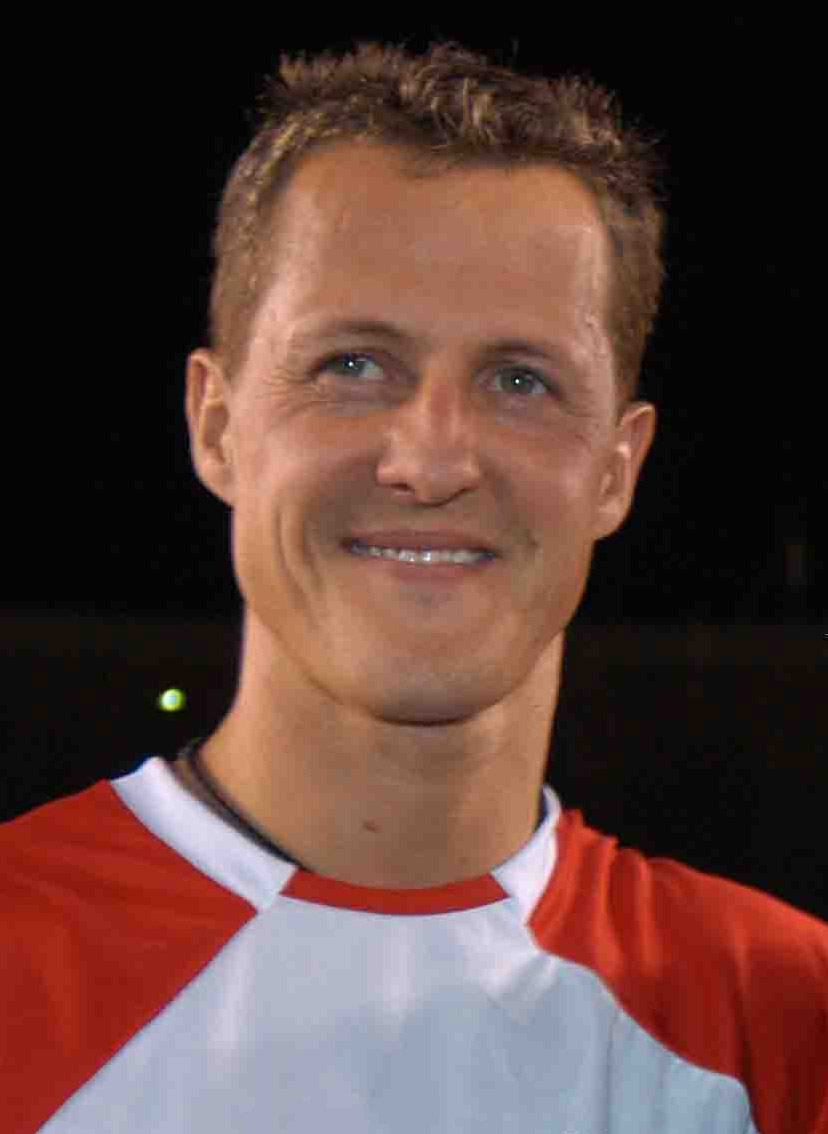
Michael Schumacher (pictured in 2005) took pole position for the 30th time in his career.

Saturday's afternoon one hour qualifying session saw each driver limited to twelve laps, with the starting order decided by their fastest laps. During this session, the 107% rule was in effect, which necessitated each driver set a time within 107 per cent of the quickest lap to qualify for the race. The session was held in cloudy skies with periodic rain showers. Meteorologists predicted a 70% probability of rain, so several drivers concerned over a downpower went onto the circuit early on as a precaution; the downpour never materialised. Michael Schumacher adjusted his rear wing angle and went out of teammate Barrichello's slipstream to drive quicker on the main straight into turn one after the latter aborted a run, fearful that McLaren may lap faster despite their MP4/15 cars having more downforce. He took his seventh pole position of the season and 30th of his career with a lap time of 1:14.266 set seven minutes in. Coulthard was second, one-tenth of a second slower after going from fourth to second. Coulthard was aided by running in Häkkinen's slipstream for more speed through turn 13 and the start of the main straight before his teammate let him pass at the start of the former's final quick lap after being asked over the radio by McLaren technical director Adrian Newey if it would help. Häkkinen qualified third after completing nearly all of the 12 allowed laps and having no time for a final run, saying he was not disappointed to start from third. Barrichello qualified fourth, three-tenths of a second behind Michael Schumacher, after being too far behind to benefit from his teammate's slipstream. He said he had more grip in his car to improve his time but had a minor understeer. Trulli qualified sixth late in the session after replacing his car's engine due to issues during practice. Button took sixth on his third run due to a yellow flag for Alesi's engine failure. He acknowledged pushing too hard at the first corner on his fourth attempt, despite encouragement from his team.

Frentzen, seventh, reported grip troubles in the infield and slid onto the grass at turn eight. Villeneuve, eighth, felt he should have lapped quicker after spinning at the turn nine hairpin while on his final set of qualifying tyres. Diniz qualified ninth, a season best, after improving the car's feel by removing some downforce. Ralf Schumacher, tenth, had car setup issues that compromised handling, and he spun onto the turn eight grass on his fourth attempt. Wurz qualified 11th and expressed satisfaction with his car after his engineers modified the setup. BAR's Ricardo Zonta qualified 12th on his second run, blaming understeer. He was ahead of Verstappen, who made a driving error, and Salo noted his car did not operate well with a low fuel load and had car balance issues, causing it to go from excess understeer to oversteer. Fisichella, 15th, said understeer and poor grip prevented him from lapping faster but Benetton team principal Flavio Briatore blamed the driver for his performance. He qualified ahead of Heidfeld in 16th and Irvine in 17th, who adjusted his car's wing settings from one run to another, and spun at turn seven. Arrows' Pedro de la Rosa took 18th after an error on his final quick lap and nearly collided with a Jaguar on a previous run. Herbert, 19th, drove a difficult to handle car and Alesi took 20th after lacking running due to a pneumatic valve engine system failure, forcing him to go off the circuit after turn ten with smoke billowing from the car's rear. The two Minardi drivers qualified in 21st and 22nd, with Gastón Mazzacane ahead of Gené. Both drivers experienced understeer, failing to equal their previous day's times.

=== Qualifying classification ===
Pos	No	Driver	Constructor	Lap	Gap
1	3	(Germany) Michael Schumacher	Ferrari	1:14.266	—
2	2	(United Kingdom) David Coulthard	McLaren-Mercedes	1:14.392	+0.126
3	1	(Finland) Mika Häkkinen	McLaren-Mercedes	1:14.428	+0.162
4	4	(Brazil) Rubens Barrichello	Ferrari	1:14.600	+0.334
5	6	(Italy) Jarno Trulli	Jordan-Mugen-Honda	1:15.006	+0.740
6	10	(United Kingdom) Jenson Button	Williams-BMW	1:15.017	+0.751
7	5	(Germany) Heinz-Harald Frentzen	Jordan-Mugen-Honda	1:15.067	+0.801
8	22	(Canada) Jacques Villeneuve	BAR-Honda	1:15.317	+1.051
9	16	(Brazil) Pedro Diniz	Sauber-Petronas	1:15.418	+1.152
10	9	(Germany) Ralf Schumacher	Williams-BMW	1:15.484	+1.218
11	12	(Austria) Alexander Wurz	Benetton-Playlife	1:15.762	+1.496
12	23	(Brazil) Ricardo Zonta	BAR-Honda	1:15.784	+1.518
13	19	(Netherlands) Jos Verstappen	Arrows-Supertec	1:15.808	+1.542
14	17	(Finland) Mika Salo	Sauber-Petronas	1:15.881	+1.615
15	11	(Italy) Giancarlo Fisichella	Benetton-Playlife	1:15.907	+1.641
16	15	(Germany) Nick Heidfeld	Prost-Peugeot	1:16.060	+1.794
17	7	(United Kingdom) Eddie Irvine	Jaguar-Cosworth	1:16.098	+1.832
18	18	(Spain) Pedro de la Rosa	Arrows-Supertec	1:16.143	+1.877
19	8	(United Kingdom) Johnny Herbert	Jaguar-Cosworth	1:16.225	+1.959
20	14	(France) Jean Alesi	Prost-Peugeot	1:16.471	+2.205
21	21	(Argentina) Gastón Mazzacane	Minardi-Fondmetal	1:16.809	+2.543
22	20	(Spain) Marc Gené	Minardi-Fondmetal	1:17.161	+2.895
107% time: 1:19.465

== Warm-up ==
A 30-minute warm-up session was held on the morning of the race in cool, damp, and overcast weather following heavy overnight rain, with poor grip and many drivers going off the track onto the grass. Drivers were keen to test their cars on the damp track, and some tested wet-weather tyres, which overheated in the banking and on the main straight. Some teams put dry tyres on their cars shortly before the session ended. Coulthard set the fastest time, a 1:23.14, with six minutes to go. Häkkinen, Michael Schumacher and Villeneuve were in the next three places. Diniz spun at turn seven before the back straight, Trulli went across the gravel trap at turn 11, Heidfeld slid into the turn one run-off area and Irvine spun at turn eight during the session.

The FIA safety delegate, Charlie Whiting, moved the grid's front row back 8 ft (2.4 m) the previous night after concerns were raised by Coulthard and Michael Schumacher who experienced wheelspin while crossing the "Yard of Bricks" laid in the track, which stretched from its outside edge to the pit lane. They were concerned that when the race began from a standing start, their cars would lose traction or crash. Whiting also had the pit lane speed limit zone advanced 330 m (1,080 ft) deeper between turns 12 and 13 and raised the speed limit from 80 km/h (50 mph) to 120 km/h (75 mph) after most drivers raised concerns over the high speeds entering the pit lane during the race arising from incidents there during practice.

== Race ==
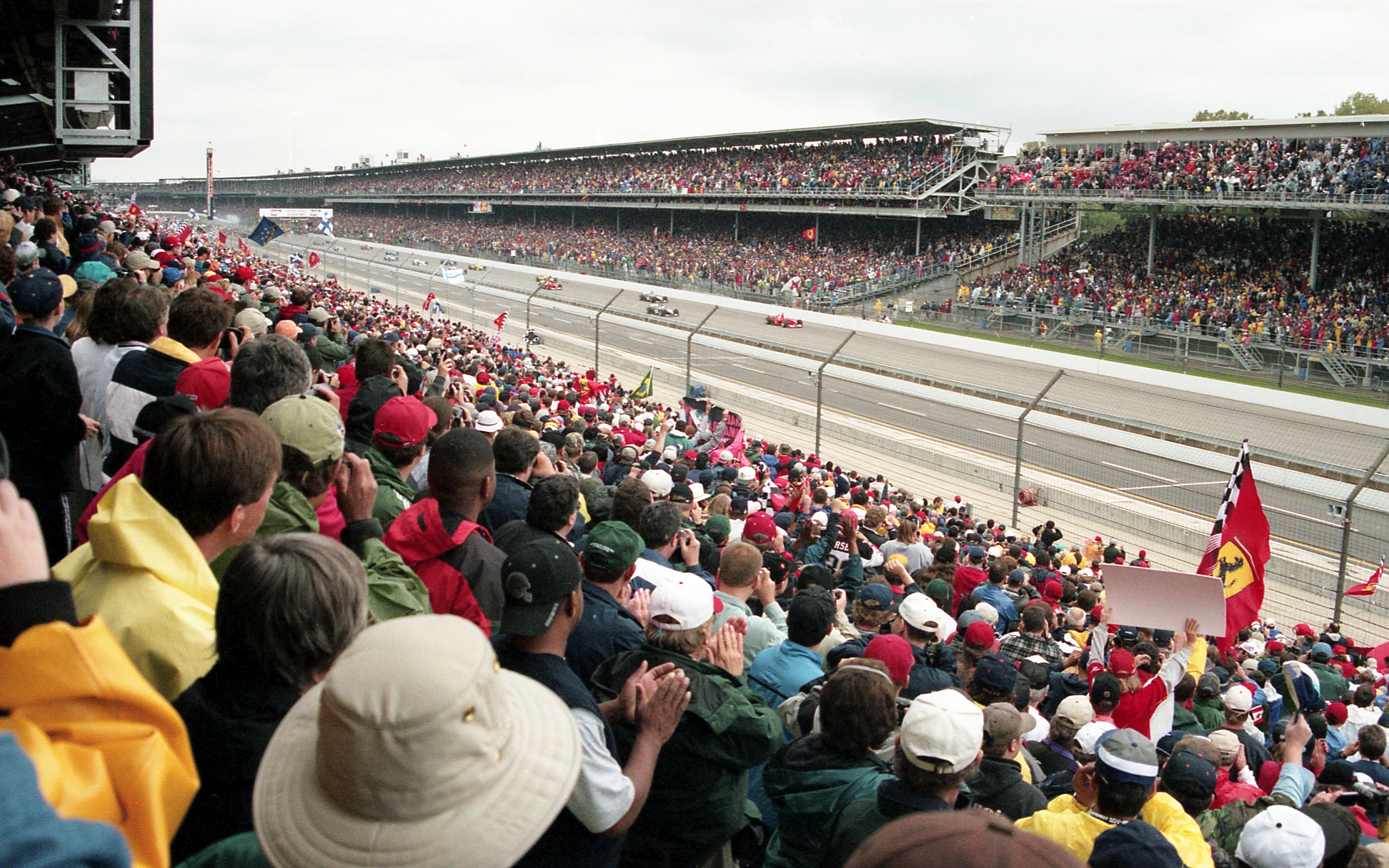
The start of the Grand Prix.

The Grand Prix began at 13:00 Eastern Time after the FIA moved the race's start time by an hour from 14:00 local time for unknown reasons. The conditions on the grid were dry and damp before the race; the air temperature was between 12 and 14 °C (54 and 57 °F) and the track temperature between 13 and 14 °C (55 and 57 °F). Approximately 250,000 people attended the race, breaking the record set at the 1995 Australian Grand Prix. Every driver, except Herbert, began on the intermediate compound tyre when heavy rain fell between the end of warm-up and just before the afternoon, making the track much wetter; no more rain was forecast however the oval section dried quickly but the infield did not since there was still standing water there, making it slippery and provided less grip. Engineers from each team were required to repeatedly calculate the optimal lap to switch from wet-weather tyres to dry tyres because of the drying circuit. When the five red lights on the starting gantry went out but before any driver moved off the starting grid, Coulthard jumped the start by releasing the clutch too soon, taking the lead into turn one. The stewards investigated Coulthard for the jump start and reviewed video footage. Häkkinen held off Barrichello's attempts to pass him for third going into turn one. Herbert fell from 19th to 22nd by the end of the first lap. Frentzen lost seventh place mid-lap after going wide, dropping two positions to Villeneuve and Ralf Schumacher.

At the end of the first lap, Coulthard led from Michael Schumacher, Häkkinen, Barrichello, Trulli and Button. Coulthard had a 1.7-second lead over Michael Schumacher by the end of lap two. Button attempted to overtake Trulli for seventh on the back straight, but the two collided. Both drivers went off the track and made pit stops to replace rear punctures, dropping to the back of the field. Frentzen overtook Ralf Schumacher for sixth place, Zonta passed Diniz for eighth, while Verstappen advanced two spots to tenth after passing Irvine and Wurz. On lap three, De la Rosa passed Heidfeld for 13th place, and Gené passed Fisichella for 17th. Coulthard's lead over Michael Schumacher was cut to one second on the following lap. De la Rosa moved up the field by passing Wurz for twelfth. On lap five, Alesi became the first driver to make a pit stop for dry tyres. The first three drivers were close together, and Michael Schumacher, having generated enough heat in his tyres, began attacking Coulthard for the lead on the same lap that the latter was asked to slow down in order to slow Schumacher and allow his teammate Häkkinen to close in and challenge the Ferrari driver. Michael Schumacher came closer on Coulthard in the infield segment, challenging him for the lead.

Michael Schumacher unsuccessfully tried to overtake Coulthard on the outside on the start/finish straight at the start of lap six. Coulthard's blocking of Schumacher allowed Häkkinen to close up and almost pass on the inside. Barrichello was the first of the frontrunners to make a pit stop at the end of the same lap, while Irvine lost 11th to De la Rosa. By this point, the track had dried enough for teams to change tyres, but several drivers struggled to generate temperature into the hard dry compound tyres, with Barrichello's car balance deteriorating, resulting in excess oversteer due to the recommended high tyre pressures ensuring the tyres flexed less. Michael Schumacher passed Coulthard on the outside of the start/finish straight into turn one on lap seven. Both drivers made minor contact and Michael Schumacher left the corner ahead of Coulthard. Michael Schumacher began to pull away from the field, with no one to hinder him. Häkkinen was let through into second place by teammate Coulthard, who entered the pit lane and prompted numerous cars to switch to dry tyres on lap seven, including Ralf Schumacher, Zonta, Verstappen, Irvine, and Wurz. Button's better lap times on the dry tyres encouraged a majority of the drivers to make pit stops to switch from intermediate tyres.

The stewards handed Coulthard a ten-second stop-go penalty on lap eight, and he was summoned to the pit lane at the end of the lap to serve the penalty. Despite nearly colliding with De la Rosa after serving the penalty, Coulthard dropped from second to sixth place, while Fisichella served an identical penalty on the same lap and remained in 22nd. Michael Schumacher, Frentzen, Diniz and Mazzacane were the only drivers not to change tyres by lap nine, while Coulthard returned to the pit lane to make his pit stop for dry tyres due to the track drying. He rejoined in 16th, behind Gené. Over the next three laps, De la Rosa and Zonta traded twelfth, while Ralf Schumacher passed Barrichello for seventh. Diniz, who was running third, made a pit stop on lap twelve and emerged in sixth. Both Williams drivers began trading fastest laps on that lap. Mazzacane, who had decided to stay on wet-weather tyres, began battling Häkkinen's attempts to overtake him on lap 13, losing the latter around 13 seconds while Ralf Schumacher passed Diniz for sixth. Trulli's mechanics did not have the correct tyres ready for his pit stop on the same lap, and the left-rear wheel nut did not appear to be replaced. He then stopped on the side of the track after turn one, retiring with a broken suspension caused by his earlier accident with Button. Frentzen and Mazzacane made their pit stops on lap 14, allowing Häkkinen into second. Button retired his car alongside the barrier on the inside of the start/finish straight a lap later with an engine failure, possibly caused by his car bottoming out on the Yard of Bricks.

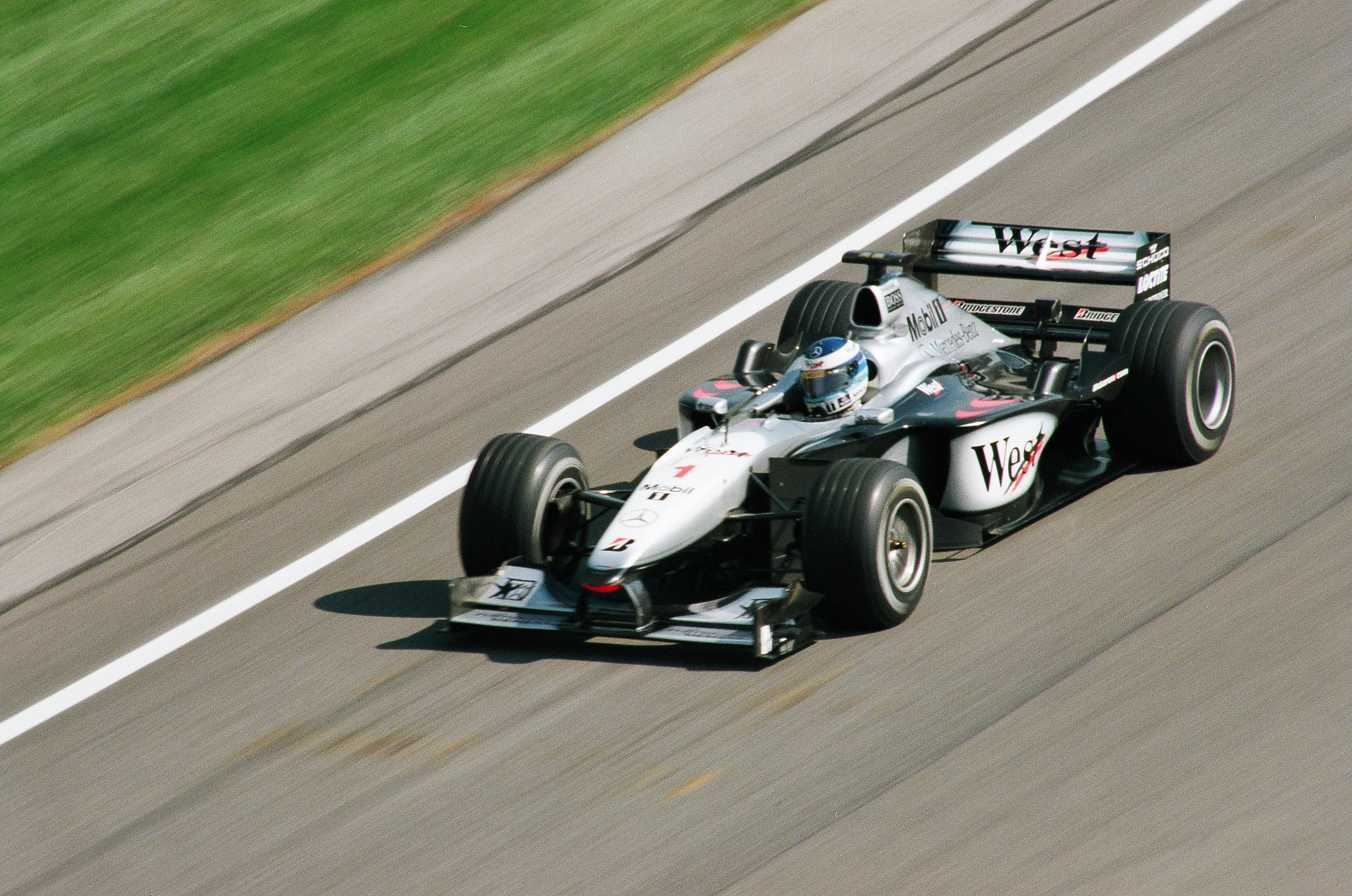
Mika Häkkinen was gaining on Michael Schumacher when he retired on lap 26 with a pneumatic valve system failure and lost the World Drivers' Championship lead to Schumacher.

Michael Schumacher made a pit stop for fuel and tyres at the end of lap 16, taking seven seconds. He re-emerged in first place, sixteen seconds ahead of Häkkinen, who began steadily reducing Michael Schumacher's lead. Herbert passed Barrichello in turn one and battled Diniz for sixth on lap 18, but had to brake hard as Diniz defended at the turn. Diniz went off the track at turn eight, and Herbert and Villeneuve overtook him. Barrichello overtook Diniz for eighth at turn one on lap 19. Salo spun backwards into the gravel trap at turn three on the same lap, becoming the race's third retirement after becoming stuck in the gravel and unable to extricate himself. Seven laps later, Häkkinen had cut Michael Schumacher's lead to four seconds with a string of fastest laps. This was before Häkkinen's pneumatic valve system failed due to a faulty engine component, resulting in a complete engine failure. Flames and smoke billowed from Häkkinen's rear-left engine exhaust banks, and he retired at the pit lane entry. This moved Ralf Schumacher to second and Frentzen to third.

Herbert had a problematic pit stop on lap 28. He ran into a puddle entering the pit lane, and a wheelchanger dropped his wheel gun on Herbert's front wing, which had to be replaced. Herbert returned to the track in 17th. Coulthard passed Irvine for ninth two laps later. Verstappen's brake balance system failed on lap 35, causing him to lock the rear brakes and crash straight into the turn eight tyre wall. This promoted Diniz into the points-paying positions in sixth. Coulthard continued to gain positions, passing De la Rosa for seventh on lap 37 after a previous attempt at turn one failed. Coulthard attempted to overtake Diniz on the following lap but failed due to a lack of slipstream, and Diniz defended sixth. On lap 39, Coulthard succeeded the second time round by passing Diniz on the inside at the turn one braking zone. Ralf Schumacher was the first driver to make a planned pit stop on that lap. On lap 40, Villeneuve was closing in on Frentzen in second place when he spun 180 degrees at turn nine, allowing Barrichello to pass him from third.

That same lap, Coulthard set the race's fastest lap, a 1:14.710. He made a pit stop for fuel and tyres one lap later, rejoining in eleventh after a 9.6-second stop. Ralf Schumacher had a 24.3-second pit stop on the following lap because his engine's leaking pneumatic valve system needed to be recharged. De la Rosa retired on the start/finish straight alongside the pit lane barrier when his gearbox failed while he was in fifth gear on lap 46, and Fisichella retired in the pit lane one lap later with smoke spewing from his engine as he approached the pit entry. Race leader Michael Schumacher made a pit stop on lap 49, retaining a ten-second lead over Frentzen. Mazzacane made a pit stop on lap 51 and missed his stopping position, causing some pit lane equipment to be pulled and injuring front-right wheel changer Ricardo Pozzati and refueller Sandro Parrini. Both men were brought to the infield hospital for x-ray examinations after suffering minor injuries in the crash.

Ferrari brought their pit crew to position themselves for what appeared to be for a pit stop for Barrichello, therefore Frentzen entered the pit lane on that lap, believing that Barrichello was stopping. Ferrari technical director Ross Brawn instructed Barrichello to stay on the track and lap quickly because his car had less fuel, before becoming the final driver to make a planned pit stop on lap 53. He rejoined the track in second. By the end of lap 55, after the scheduled pit stops, the order was Michael Schumacher, Barrichello, Frentzen, Villeneuve, Coulthard and Diniz. Diniz made a pit stop on lap 59 to fix a handling issue and dropped to tenth. Ralf Schumacher retired from the race due to his pneumatic valve system fault, prompting Williams to switch off the engine to prevent damage two laps later. Mazzacane stopped his car on the grass at turn 11 on lap 62, retiring with smoke billowing from the rear. Villeneuve (with his more powerful Honda engine) attempted to pass Frentzen for third into turn one on lap 65, but he braked too late and skidded onto the grass on the outside of the corner, allowing Frentzen to stay in third.

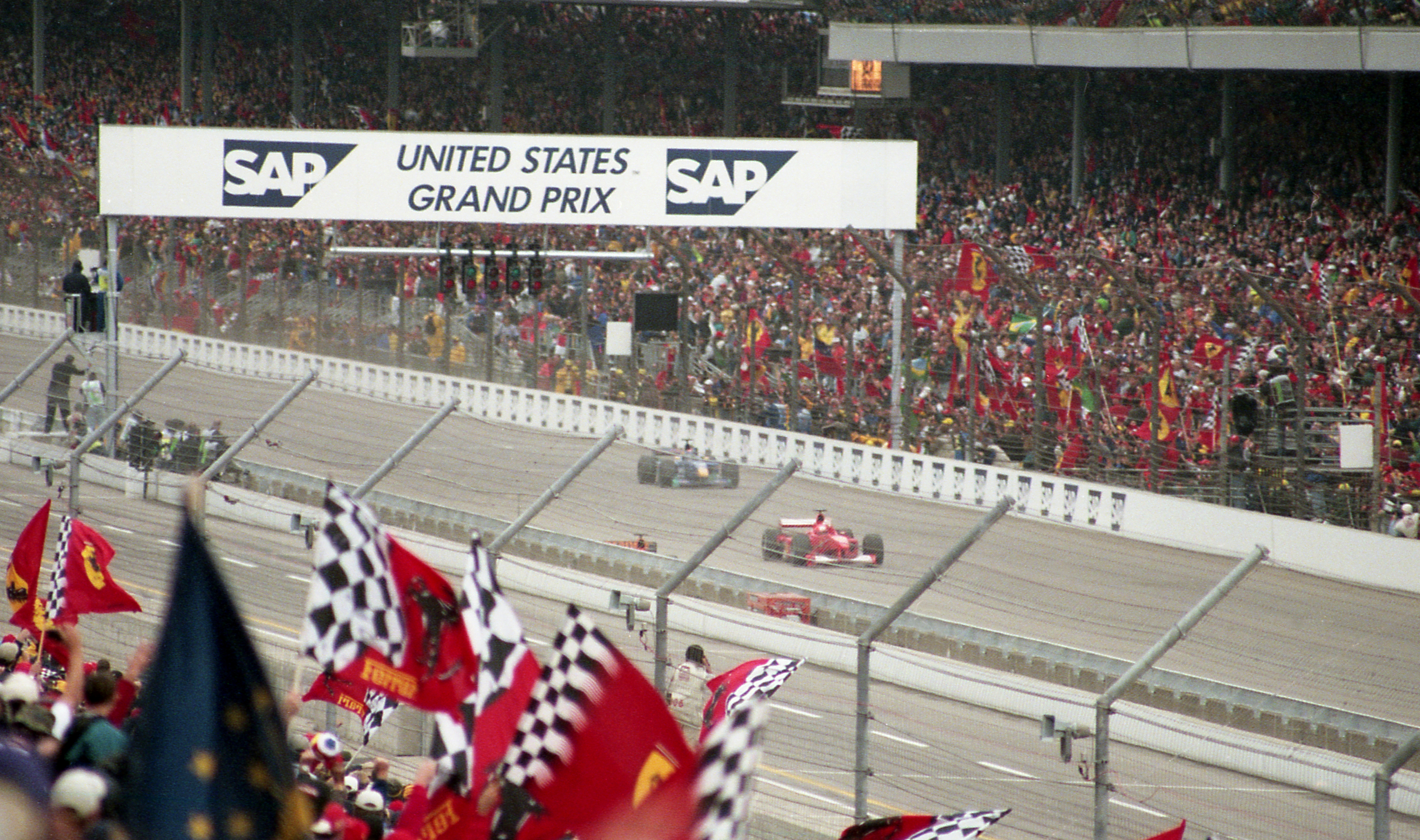
Michael Schumacher celebrates his second consecutive race victory.

Alesi became the race's final retirement when his engine failed, causing him to spin backwards at turn eight on the following lap, almost being hit by his teammate Heidfeld. Three laps later, Michael Schumacher spun 270 degrees after landing his right-front wheel on the damp grass at turn nine's hairpin due to a lack of focus. He did not hit anything, was able to keep the engine going without stalling and retained the lead. Schumacher crossed the start/finish line on lap 73 for his seventh win of the season and 42nd overall. His teammate Barrichello finished second 12.1 seconds behind. Frentzen finished third for the second time in the season, beating off a late-race attack from Villeneuve in fourth, half a second behind him. Coulthard was unable to push as hard as he would have liked on his second set of tyres, finishing fifth, while Zonta finished sixth for the second consecutive race. Irvine in seventh was the last driver on the lead lap, with Diniz, Heidfeld, Wurz, Herbert, and Gené the final classified finishers, albeit one lap behind.

=== Post-race ===
The top three drivers appeared on the podium to collect their trophies and in the subsequent press conference. Michael Schumacher explained that his late-race spin was caused to a lack of concentration when his team instructed him to slow down. Nonetheless, he expressed happiness with his win and declared that his team would focus on claiming the Drivers' and Constructors' championships. According to Barrichello, wet-weather tyres allowed him to lap two seconds faster than dry tyres. He also stated that, despite having an advantage on the wet track, he had struggled with significant oversteer and maintaining his car on a high fuel load after his pit stop. During the post-race interview, Frentzen described his race as "hard" because of the amount of time spent passing other drivers. He also praised his team's performance following a series of poor results.

Villeneuve expressed disappointment for losing out on a third-place finish, which would have been his team's first podium position: "Today was a lot of fun and we were really quick in the race, but it's frustrating to get so close to a podium. I made a couple of mistakes, but it probably wouldn't have made a difference in the end." Coulthard expressed disappointment at his jump-start and apologised. Zonta was delighted to finish sixth, noting that his competitors were faster early in the race due to fuel loads, but he was able to keep up with them. Häkkinen was disappointed to retire from the race and felt "it could have been interesting by the end of the race" since he was gaining on Michael Schumacher, saying, "I mean, this is not good, but we still have two races. Anything can happen." Mercedes-Benz motorsport vice-president Norbert Haug apologised to Häkkinen for the engine failure.

After the race, Michael Schumacher accused Coulthard of "unsporting behaviour" in the battle for the race lead. The accusation emerged following Coulthard's minor collision with Schumacher, who claimed Coulthard was driving dangerously: "He [Coulthard] ran in a way that he thought it [touching] could happen, and he didn't try to avoid that, that's pretty simple. As he is not fighting for the championship.....I just want to make sure that we don't see teammates helping the drivers fighting for the championship in the way which is not appropriate." Coulthard denied any wrongdoing: "I could have easily pushed him off the circuit. But I didn't and I won't in the future because it is not sporting and it is not the way I do things." Trulli and Button had a similar ill-feeling following their collision on lap two, the second in three races. Trulli called the Williams driver an "idiot" and accused him of "driving like a crazy". Button suggested that Trulli had moved towards him slightly, despite believing he had taken the right line. He also believed Trulli moved towards him while braking.

A total of 15 out of 20 Indianapolis 500 winners lauded the race's first running in Indianapolis. Danny Sullivan, the 1985 Indianapolis 500 winner, praised the race organisers' efforts: "Tony George has done a phenomenal job of integrating it into (the schedule) and not losing the integrity of the current Indianapolis 500 track. I think this shows this is the place it (Formula One) should be." Emerson Fittipaldi, the 1993 winner and double Formula One World Champion, believed that it would begin in a new era of Formula One racing in the United States. Fittipaldi's opinion was echoed by 1998 winner Eddie Cheever, who believed the race would encourage more Americans to enter Formula One. The race received the Race Promoters' Trophy at the FIA Prize Giving Ceremony in Monte Carlo in December 2000.

As a result of the race, Michael Schumacher reclaimed the lead in the World Drivers' Championship, with 88 championship points, for the second time in the 2000 season, which he would not relinquish in the final two races. Häkkinen's failure to finish lost him the Drivers' Championship lead, leaving him eight championship points behind Michael Schumacher. Coulthard finished fifth and remained in third, 25 championship points behind Michael Schumacher, ending his chances of winning the Drivers' Championship. The McLaren team's poor results, along with Ferrari's one-two finish, resulted in Ferrari retaking the lead in the World Constructors' Championship, ten championship points ahead of McLaren with two races in the season remaining.

=== Race classification ===
Drivers who scored championship points are denoted in bold.

Pos	No	Driver	Constructor	Laps	Time/Retired	Grid	Points
1	3	(Germany) **Michael Schumacher**	**Ferrari**	73	1:36:30.883	1	10
2	4	(Brazil) **Rubens Barrichello**	**Ferrari**	73	+12.118	4	6
3	5	(Germany) **Heinz-Harald Frentzen**	**Jordan-Mugen-Honda**	73	+17.368	7	4
4	22	(Canada) **Jacques Villeneuve**	**BAR-Honda**	73	+17.936	8	3
5	2	(United Kingdom) **David Coulthard**	**McLaren-Mercedes**	73	+28.813	2	2
6	23	(Brazil) **Ricardo Zonta**	**BAR-Honda**	73	+51.694	12	1
7	7	(United Kingdom) Eddie Irvine	Jaguar-Cosworth	73	+1:11.115	17	
8	16	(Brazil) Pedro Diniz	Sauber-Petronas	72	+1 lap	9	
9	15	(Germany) Nick Heidfeld	Prost-Peugeot	72	+1 lap	16	
10	12	(Austria) Alexander Wurz	Benetton-Playlife	72	+1 lap	11	
11	8	(United Kingdom) Johnny Herbert	Jaguar-Cosworth	72	+1 lap	19	
12	20	(Spain) Marc Gené	Minardi-Fondmetal	72	+1 lap	22	
Ret	14	(France) Jean Alesi	Prost-Peugeot	64	Engine	20	
Ret	21	(Argentina) Gastón Mazzacane	Minardi-Fondmetal	59	Engine	21	
Ret	9	(Germany) Ralf Schumacher	Williams-BMW	58	Engine	10	
Ret	18	(Spain) Pedro de la Rosa	Arrows-Supertec	45	Gearbox	18	
Ret	11	(Italy) Giancarlo Fisichella	Benetton-Playlife	44	Engine	15	
Ret	19	(Netherlands) Jos Verstappen	Arrows-Supertec	34	Brakes	13	
Ret	1	(Finland) Mika Häkkinen	McLaren-Mercedes	25	Engine	3	
Ret	17	(Finland) Mika Salo	Sauber-Petronas	18	Spun off	14	
Ret	10	(United Kingdom) Jenson Button	Williams-BMW	14	Engine	6	
Ret	6	(Italy) Jarno Trulli	Jordan-Mugen-Honda	12	Collision	5	

== Championship standings after the race ==
Drivers' Championship standings

+/–	Pos	Driver	Points
1	1	(Germany) Michael Schumacher*	88
1	2	(Finland) Mika Häkkinen*	80
	3	(United Kingdom) David Coulthard	63
	4	(Brazil) Rubens Barrichello	55
	5	(Germany) Ralf Schumacher	24

Constructors' Championship standings

+/–	Pos	Constructor	Points
1	1	(Italy) Ferrari*	143
1	2	(United Kingdom) McLaren-Mercedes*	133
	3	(United Kingdom) Williams-BMW	34
	4	(Italy) Benetton-Playlife	20
	5	(Republic of Ireland) Jordan-Mugen-Honda	17
Sources:

- Note: Only the top five positions are included for both sets of standings.
- Bold text and an asterisk indicates competitors who still had a theoretical chance of becoming World Champion.

Previous race: 2000 Italian Grand Prix	FIA Formula One World Championship; 2000 season	Next race: 2000 Japanese Grand Prix
Previous race: 1991 United States Grand Prix	United States Grand Prix	Next race: 2001 United States Grand Prix
Awards
Preceded by 1999 Malaysian Grand Prix	Formula One Promotional Trophy for Race Promoter; 2000	Succeeded by 2001 Canadian Grand Prix
