= Candido Cannavò =

Italian journalist (1930–2009)

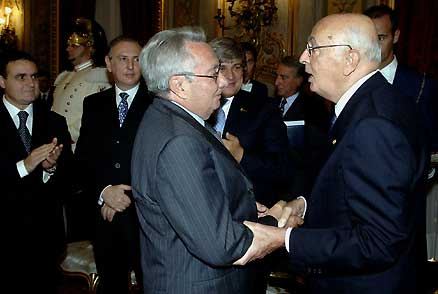
- Candido Cannavò, left, and president Giorgio Napolitano
- Born: 29 November 1930; Catania, Sicily, Kingdom of Italy
- Died: 22 February 2009 (aged 78); Milan, Lombardy, Italy
- Resting place: Monumental Cemetery, Milan
- Occupations: Journalist, writer
- Known for: Directing La Gazzetta dello Sport

Candido Cannavò (Italian pronunciation: [ˈkandido kannaˈvɔ]; 29 November 1930 – 22 February 2009) was an Italian journalist, well known as the historical editor (1983–2002) of the Italian sport newspaper La Gazzetta dello Sport.

== Biography ==
Cannavò was born in Catania, a descendant of the composer Vincenzo Bellini. He began to work as a sports journalist for La Sicilia when he was nineteen. He was president of CUS Catania from 1952 until 1955, when he was hired by La Gazzetta dello Sport. In 1981, he became vice-director and, in 1983, director. During his stay, the Gazzetta consolidated as the major Italian sport newspaper; Cannavò also launched the weekly Sportweek and the Gazzetta website.

Cannavò gained national popularity also for his numerous TV appearances in connection with the Giro d'Italia and Serie A football. He continued to write for Gazzetta until two days before his death; he was also author of an autobiography and of essays about social themes, such as Italian prisons, as well as handicapped and homeless people.

He died of cerebral hemorrhage in Milan in 2009, aged 78, and is buried at the city's Monumental Cemetery.

== Works ==
- Una vita in rosa (2002)
- Libertà dietro le sbarre (2004)
- E li chiamano disabili (2005)
- Pretacci. Storie di uomini che portano il Vangelo sul marciapiede (2008)

== Gallery ==
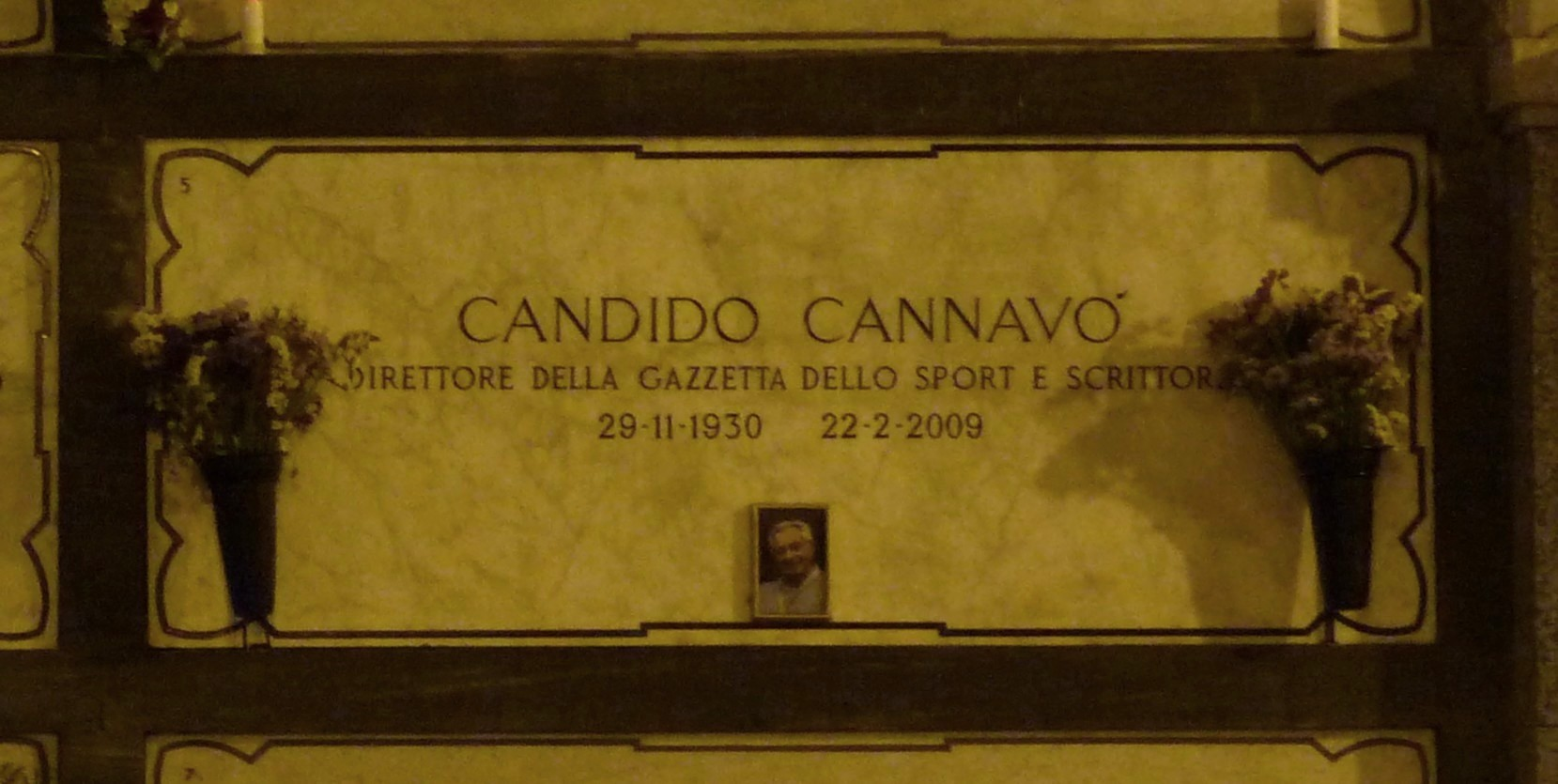
Cannavò's grave at the Monumental Cemetery of Milan, in 2015

== Sources ==
- Obituary at Gazzetta website (in Italian)
