= Ferrari 612 Scaglietti =

Grand tourer manufactured by Ferrari

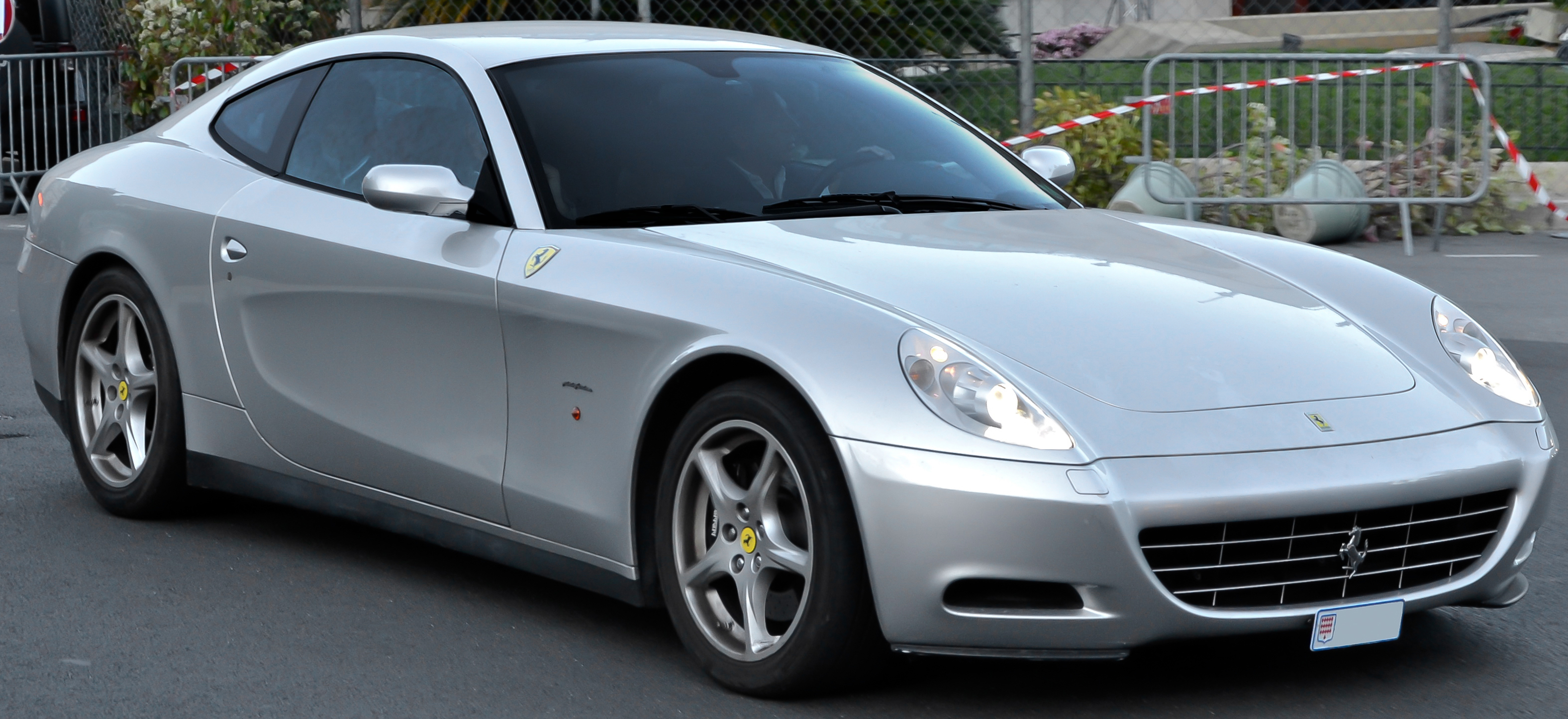

Overview
- Manufacturer: Ferrari
- Production: 2004–2011; 3,025 produced
- Assembly: Italy: Maranello
- Designer: Ken Okuyama at Pininfarina

Body and chassis
- Class: Grand tourer (S)
- Body style: 2-door 2+2 coupé
- Layout: Front-mid engine, rear-wheel-drive

Powertrain
- Engine: 5.7 L F133 F/H V12
- Power output: 540 PS (397 kW; 533 hp)
- Transmission: 6-speed manual; 6-speed F1A Graziano automated manual

Dimensions
- Wheelbase: 2,950 mm (116.1 in)
- Length: 4,902 mm (193.0 in)
- Width: 1,957 mm (77.0 in)
- Height: 1,344 mm (52.9 in)
- Kerb weight: 1,850–1,865 kg (4,078.6–4,111.6 lb)

Chronology
- Predecessor: Ferrari 456
- Successor: Ferrari FF

The Ferrari 612 Scaglietti (Type F137) (Italian pronunciation: [skaʎˈʎetti]) is an executive 2+2 coupé grand tourer made by the Italian automobile manufacturer Ferrari between 2004 and 2011. It was designed to replace the smaller 456; its larger size makes it a true 4-seater with adequate space in the rear seats for adults.

The design, especially the large side scallops and the headlights, pays homage to the 375 MM built in 1954, which director Roberto Rossellini commissioned for his wife, Ingrid Bergman.

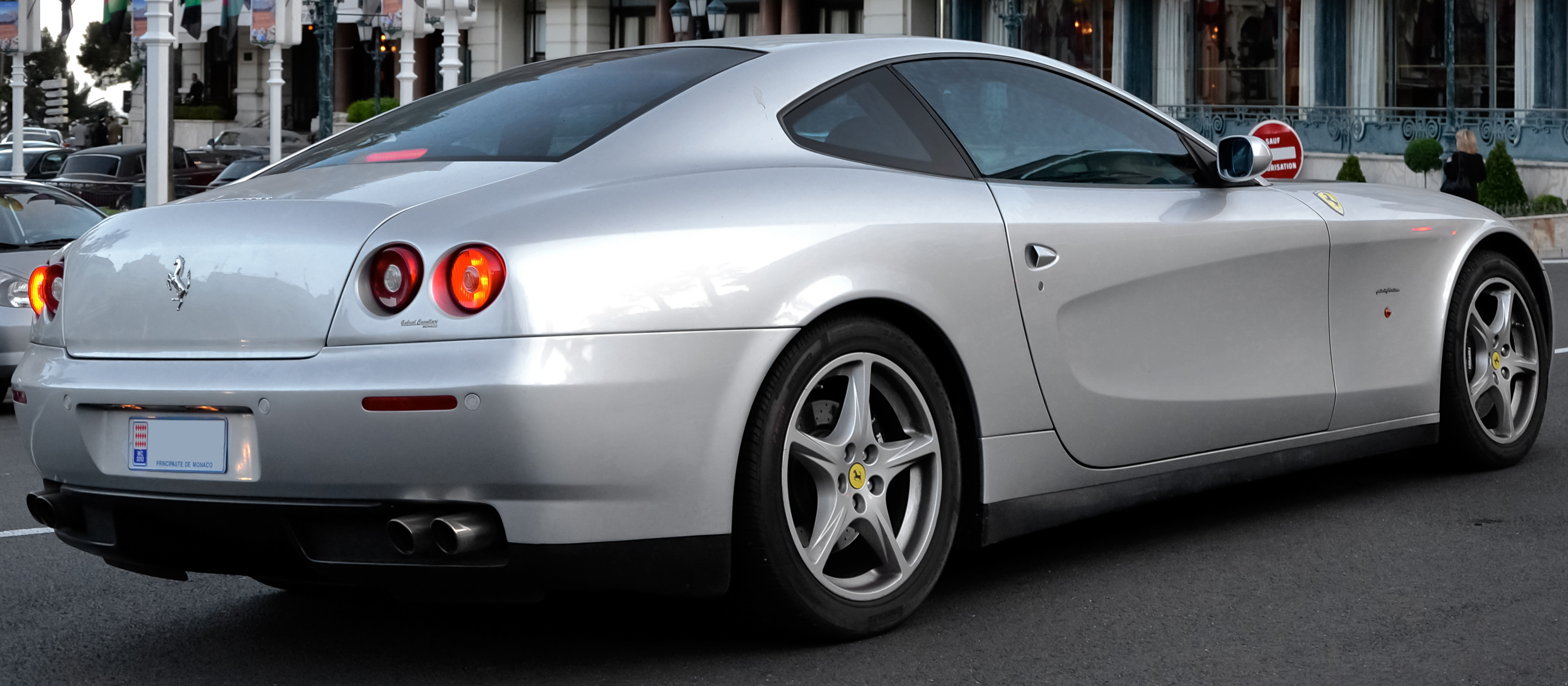
Rear view

== Chassis ==
The 612 is Ferrari's second all-aluminium vehicle, the first being the 360 Modena. Its space frame, manufactured in collaboration with Alcoa, is made from extrusions and castings of the material, and the aluminium body is then welded on. The chassis of the 612 formed the basis of the 599 GTB flagship grand tourer.

== Engine ==
The 612 Scaglietti shares its engine with the 575 Superamerica - despite the name's suggestion that it is a six-litre V12 the displacement is actually 5,748 cc (5.7 L). The engine has a compression ratio of 11:1 and enables the car to attain a top speed of 320 km/h (199 mph) and allows it to accelerate from 0–100 km/h (62 mph) in 4 seconds.

Engine type	Power, torque
5,748 cc (350.8 cu in) V12 (Tipo F133F)	397 kW; 533 hp (540 PS) at 7,250 rpm, 588 N⋅m (434 lb⋅ft) at 5,250 rpm

== Transmissions ==
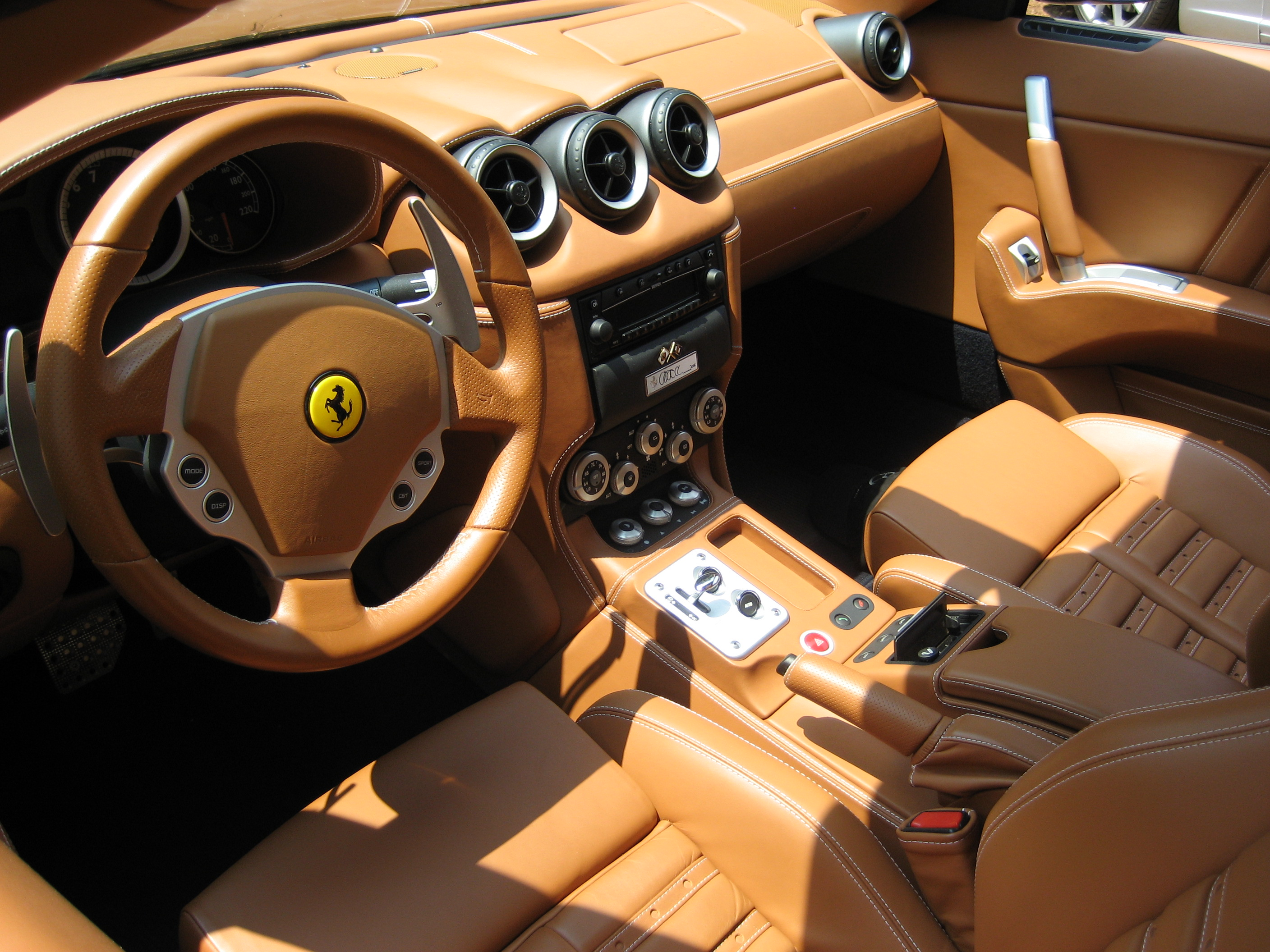
Interior with F1 paddle shift transmission

Two choices of transmissions were available on the 612, a 6-speed manual or the 6-speed automated manual paddle shift transmission designated the F1A, a much refined version of the F1 transmission used in the 360. The gearbox is built by Graziano Trasmissioni. Reportedly, only 199 cars were built with the manual transmission, of which 60 were destined for US market.

== Variants ==
=== 612 HGT-S and 612 HGT-C ===
From 2006 the "pre-OTO" versions could be ordered with the Handling Gran Turismo Sport or Handling Gran Turismo Competizione packages. They include new calibration settings for the shock absorbers and the gearbox that was 150ms faster as a result (the gearbox had a mode called F1-S instead of the auto mode). The package also includes polished exhaust grilles. Both packages were coming with the factory sport exhaust to produce a more marked and thrilling sound. The packages also included specific 19 inches modular wheels that were polished on the HGT-C package and painted brake calipers. The only difference between HGT-S and HGT-C is the addition of carbon ceramic brakes on the latter.

== Production ==
The body of the 612 was produced at Ferrari's Carrozzeria Scaglietti plant, the former home of the car's namesake coachbuilder in Modena, Italy. It was then taken to the Ferrari factory located at Maranello and the V12 engine along with the interior were installed. A total of 3,025 cars were produced, with only 199 equipped with a manual gearbox.

In 2007, Ferrari announced the availability of the SuperFast robotic (F1) gearbox and a new electro-chromatic glass roof that could tint and lighten at the push of a button for the 612. In early 2008, at the Geneva Motor Show, Ferrari unveiled the One-To-One (OTO) personalization program and thereafter the 612 was only available through this special-order process. The OTO program took the catalog of options under the existing Carrozzeria Scaglietti Programme a step further. Clients hand-picked a wide variety of options from leather swatches to brake calipers and everything in between. Although the OTO program was launched on the 612 Scaglietti, it was broadened to the entire Ferrari range in due course.

The Ferrari 612 was replaced by the Ferrari FF in 2011.

== Recall ==
In 2008, Ferrari recalled several hundred 2005–2007 Ferrari 612 Scaglietti equipped with the automated manual "F1" transmission because the clutch sensor in the transmission could malfunction due to heat from the vehicle under normal operating conditions. This would render the vehicle inoperable and possibly result in a crash.

In August 2022, another recall was announced, affecting around 23,000 road cars including the Ferrari 612 Scaglietti. This was due to a problem with the brake fluid reservoir cap "where it fails to vent properly, creating a vacuum in the reservoir which can cause brake fluid to leak. If enough fluid leaks, the car could lose partial or complete braking ability, which is dangerous for the driver." The remedy stated involves "replacing the reservoir cap with a modified version that should vent properly, as well as installing software to provide an alternate warning should brake fluid levels still reach dangerous levels. Dealers and owners will be notified on September 24."

== Special models and one-offs ==
=== 612 Sessanta (2007) ===
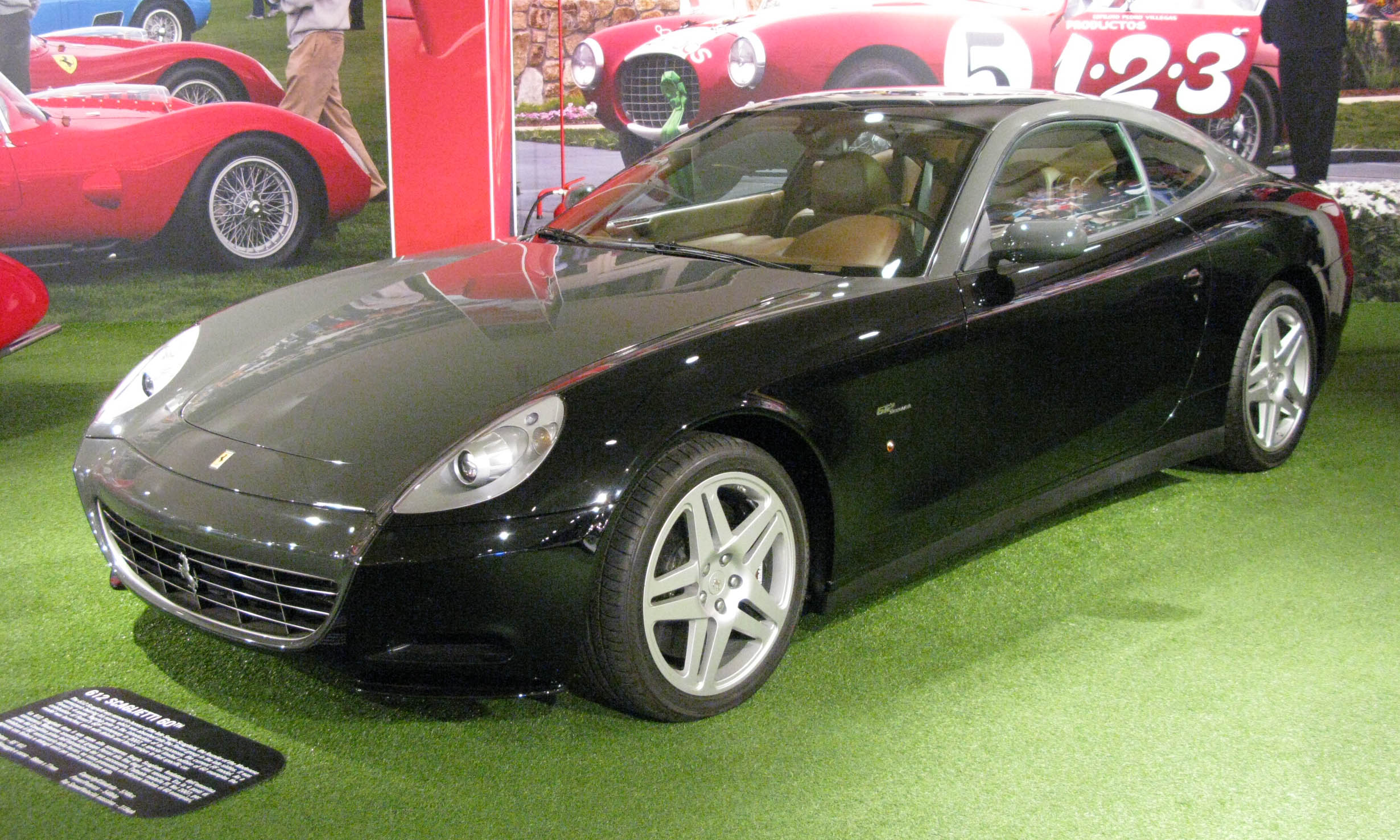
2007 Ferrari 612 Sessanta

The 612 Sessanta (Italian for "sixty") is a limited (60 unit) variant of the 612 commemorating the 60th anniversary of the company. Standard equipment included 19-inch forged aluminium wheels, black chrome exhaust tips, the automated manual F1 transmission, three-position electrochromic glass roof, start/stop ignition button on the steering wheel, Bose infotainment system and a two-tone paint.

=== 612 Pebble Beach Bicolore (2006) ===
One-off two-tone 612 Scaglietti special produced which would go on to influence one of the two colors of Sessanta models offered the following year (along with its sister car the 2006 Detroit Motor Show car). With its distinctive Nero and Silver paint scheme, the 612 Pebble Beach was displayed August 2005 at a private event during Pebble Beach Concours d'Elegance. Press articles in 2006 referred to this as the "Ferrari 612 Pebble Beach".

=== Cornes 30th Anniversary Edition (2006) ===
Unveiled in June 2006 in Japan, the Cornes 30th Anniversary Edition is a limited (20 unit) variant for the Japanese market commemorating the 30th anniversary of Cornes & Co. importing Ferrari automobiles into Japan. Standard equipment included the HGTC package, Blu Cornes paint scheme, a carbon fibre filler cap, and mesh grille inserts in the front and rear fascias.

It had an MSRP of 33,980,000 Yen ($304,000 USD).

=== 612 GP Berne Edition (2006) ===
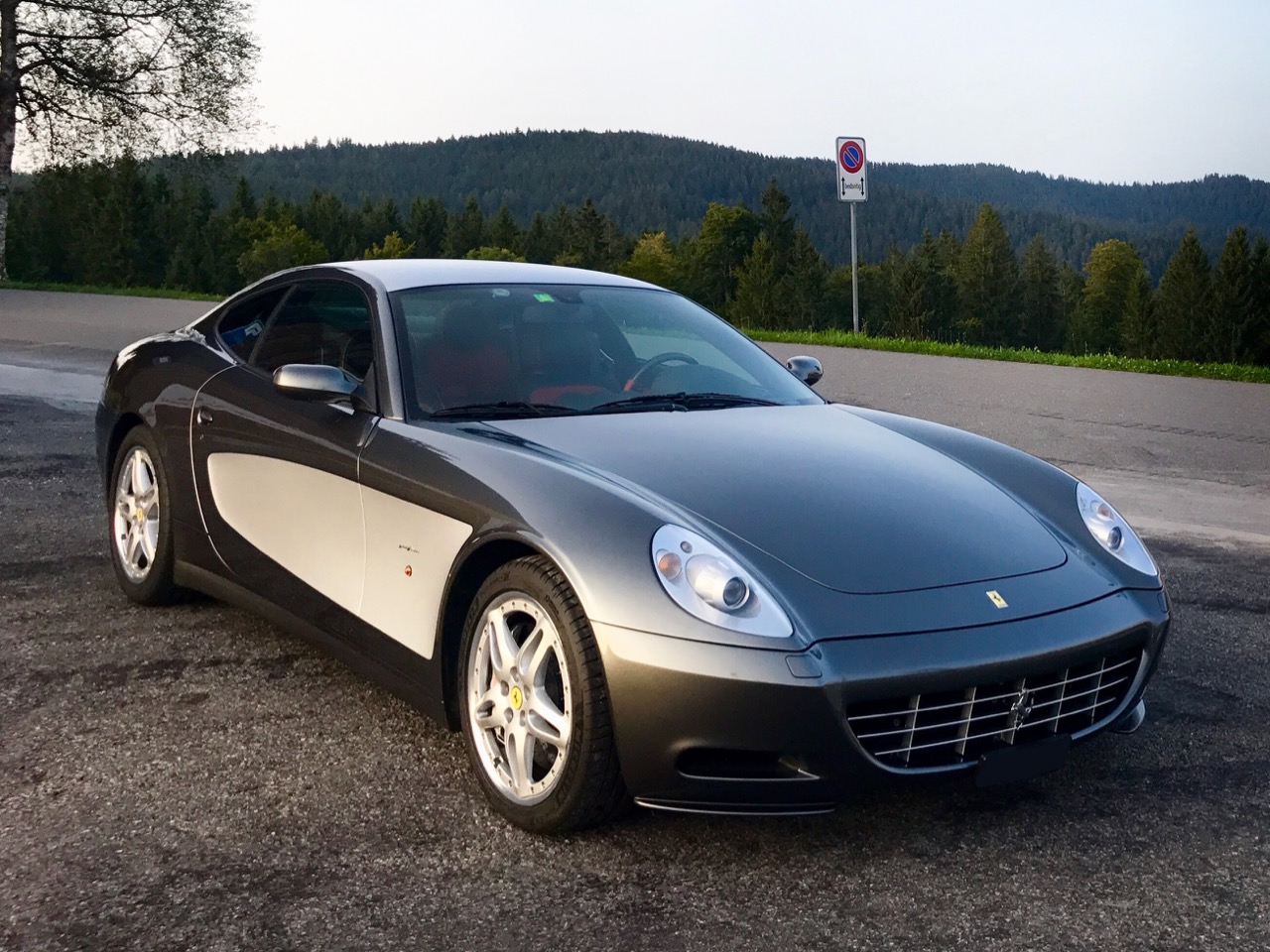
Ferrari 612 Berne GP Edition

Unveiled at Montreux Grand Prix Switzerland on July 22, 2006, the 612 GP program was in celebration of Ferrari's 40th anniversary in Switzerland and the anniversary of their first Swiss Grand Prix in 1949. The dark grey car - of which 9 were built - featured the HGTC handling package (including carbon-ceramic brakes) bi-colour paint treatment with the 612 Scaglietti's side "scallops" finished in a silver-grey color and color-coded brake calipers. The interior was finished in red with grey trim. The lower dashboard, seat front sections, central tunnel sides, door panels, and lower half of the sports steering wheel all finished in red. A special plaque, imprinted with an outline of the historic Berne track, is mounted on the dash.

It had an MSRP of CHF425,000.

=== 612 Kappa (2006) ===
The 612 Kappa is a one-off special built by Pininfarina for Peter S. Kalikow, former chairman of the New York Metropolitan Transport Authority, and a Ferrari collector, and unveiled at the Villa d'Este Concours d'Elegance on April 23, 2006. Compared to a standard 612, the Kappa features a functional hood scoop on the engine cover lined with polished aluminium, added air vents near the front wheels for improved downforce, the rear taillights found on the Ferrari Enzo and F430, personalised door handles containing the initials of the owner, chromed headlight bezels, and a sunroof that utilises electrochromic glass to vary the opacity of the glass. At the request of Kalikow, Ferrari agreed to not copy the unique elements of the 612 Kappa into its future models.

Ferrari 612 Kappa

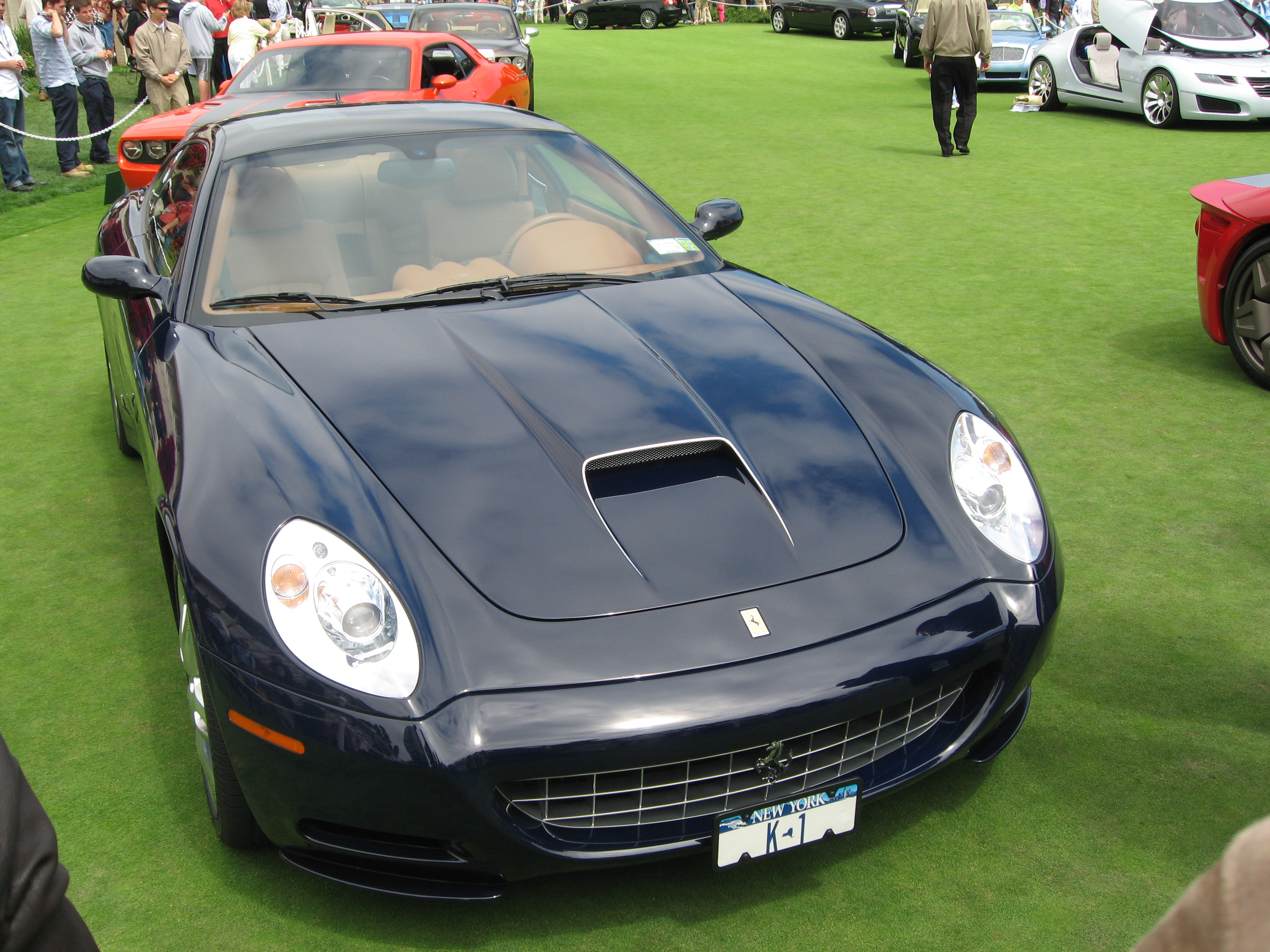

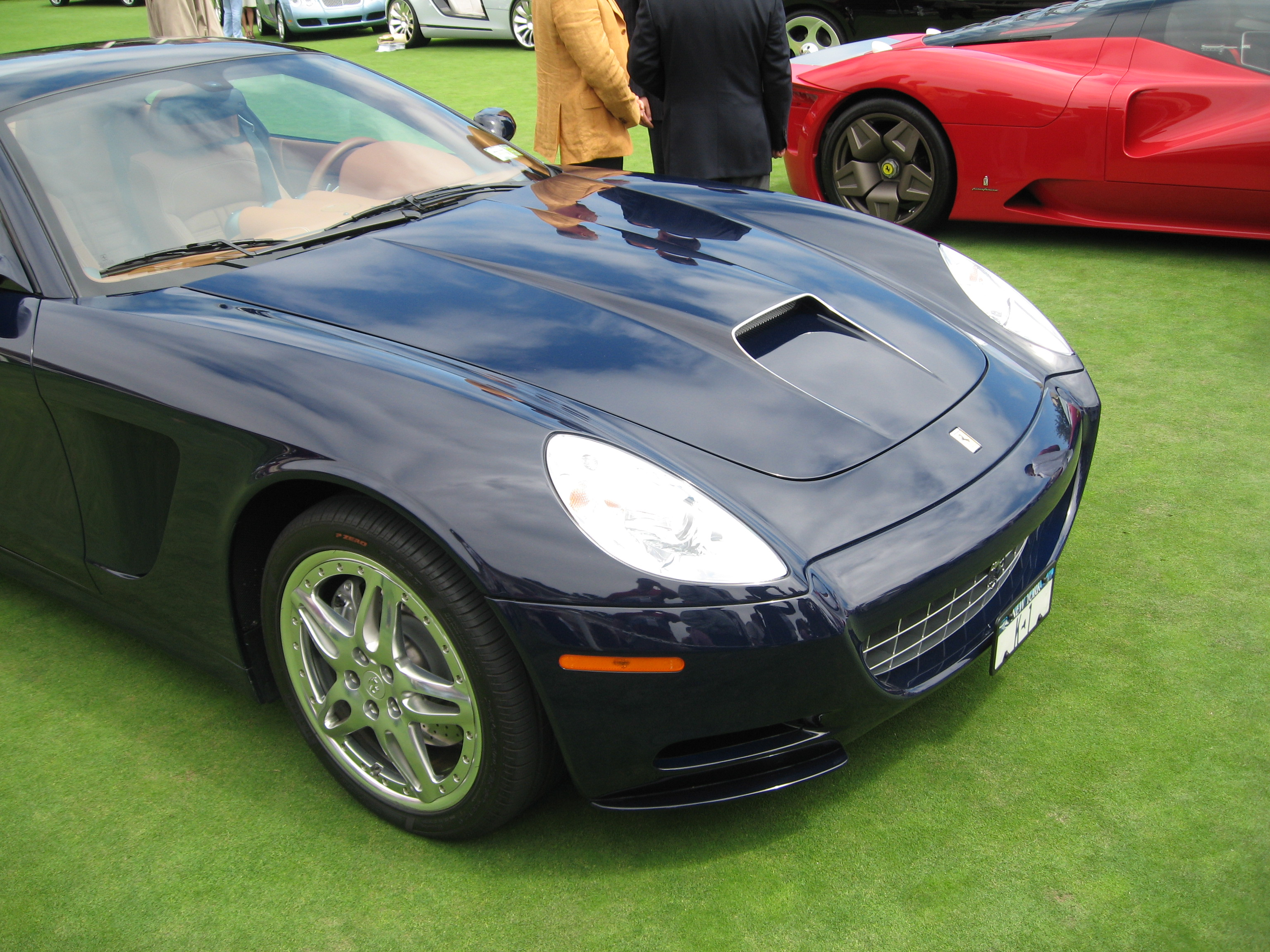

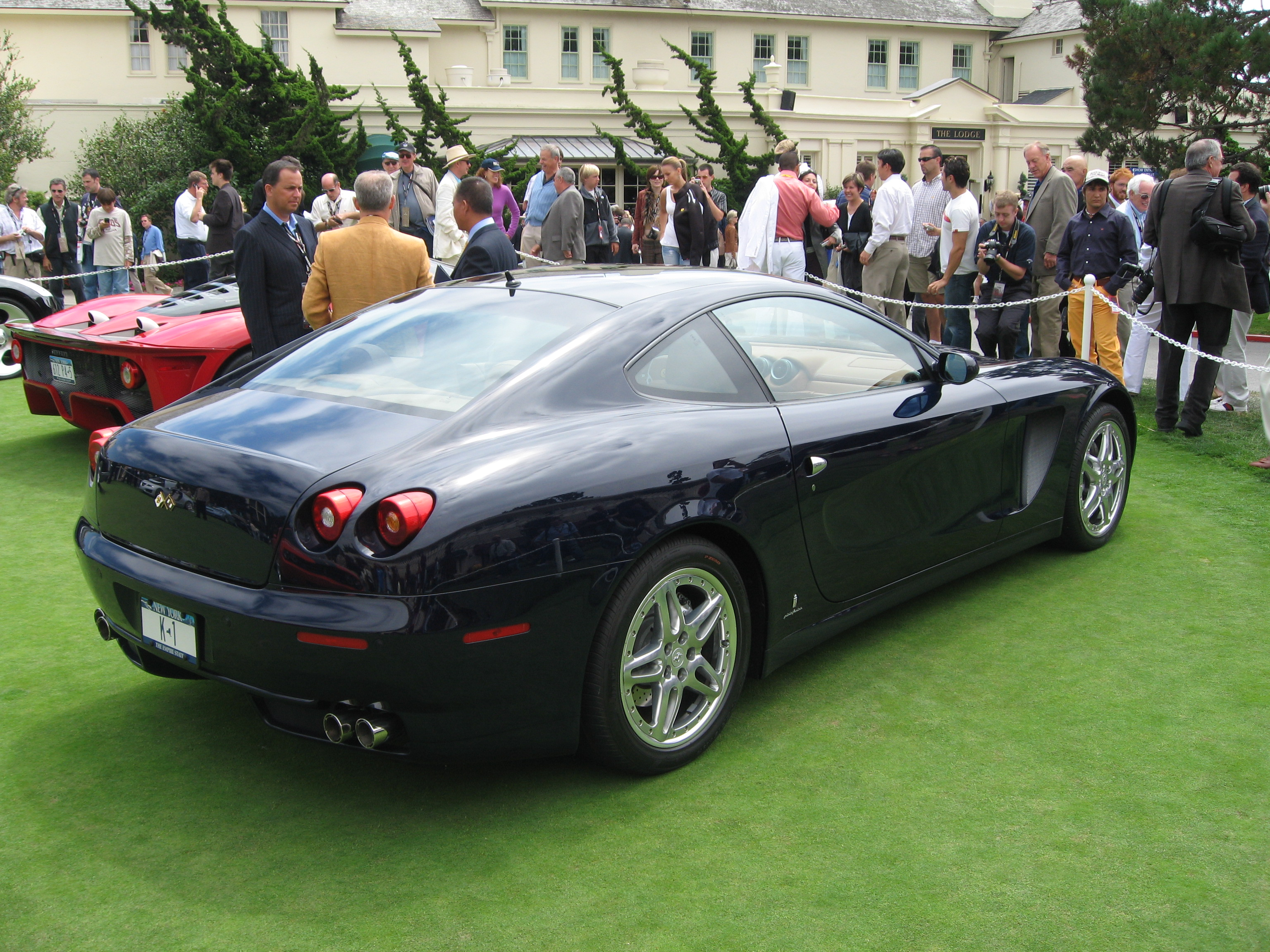

=== 612 Russian Limited Edition (2007) ===
Unveiled in December 2007, the Russian Limited Edition was built only for the Russian market. With a total of 5 units built, each copy was finished in a grey colour with a brown interior.

=== GG50 (2005) ===
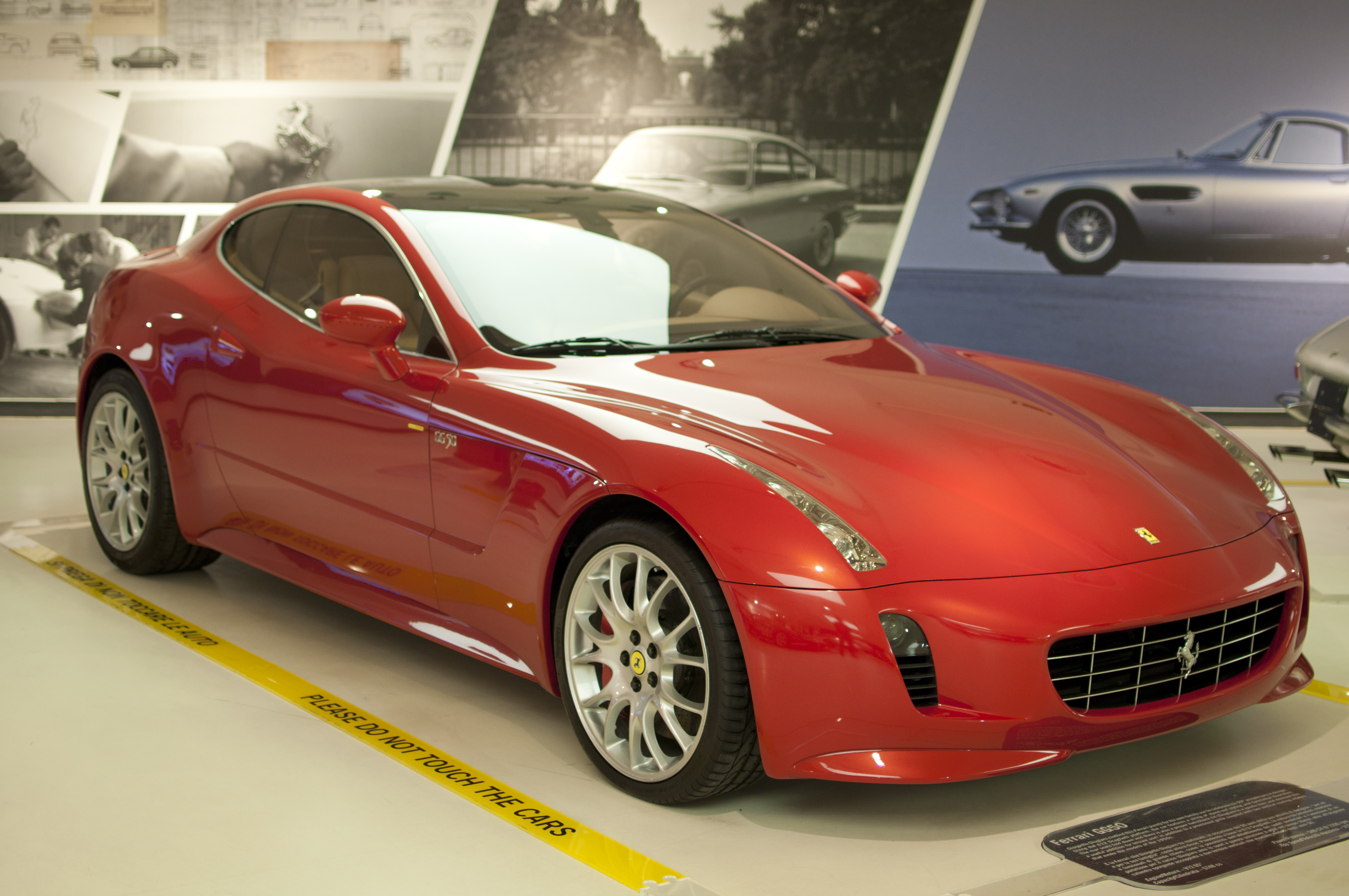
Ferrari GG50

The Ferrari GG50 is a concept car developed by Italian styling house Italdesign Giugiaro, commemorating the 50th anniversary of Giorgetto Giugiaro as an automobile designer. Based on the 612 Scaglietti, the car was designed by Giugiaro himself and has a fastback coupé body style with a shorter wheelbase than the donor car. The car features folding back seats and a tailgate in order for easy entry and exit of the passengers. The folding back seats also result in increased storage space. The roofline has been designed in a downsloping manner, resulting in more headroom for passengers in the rear seats. Apart from that, the car features a redesigned nose, unique wheels, a glass roof, front air vents near the front wheels for increased downforce and improved brake cooling, thinner headlamps and unique quad tail lamps. Giugiaro wanted a Ferrari that he could easily use with his family and which allowed easy entry and exit of passengers from the rear of the car. The mechanical components are the same as those found in a standard 612.

The car was unveiled at the 2005 Tokyo Motor Show. Ferrari provided a rolling chassis of the 612 Scaglietti and technical support to Italdesign during the build process.
