= Ken Okuyama =

Japanese industrial designer (born 1959)

Ken Okuyama 奥山 清行
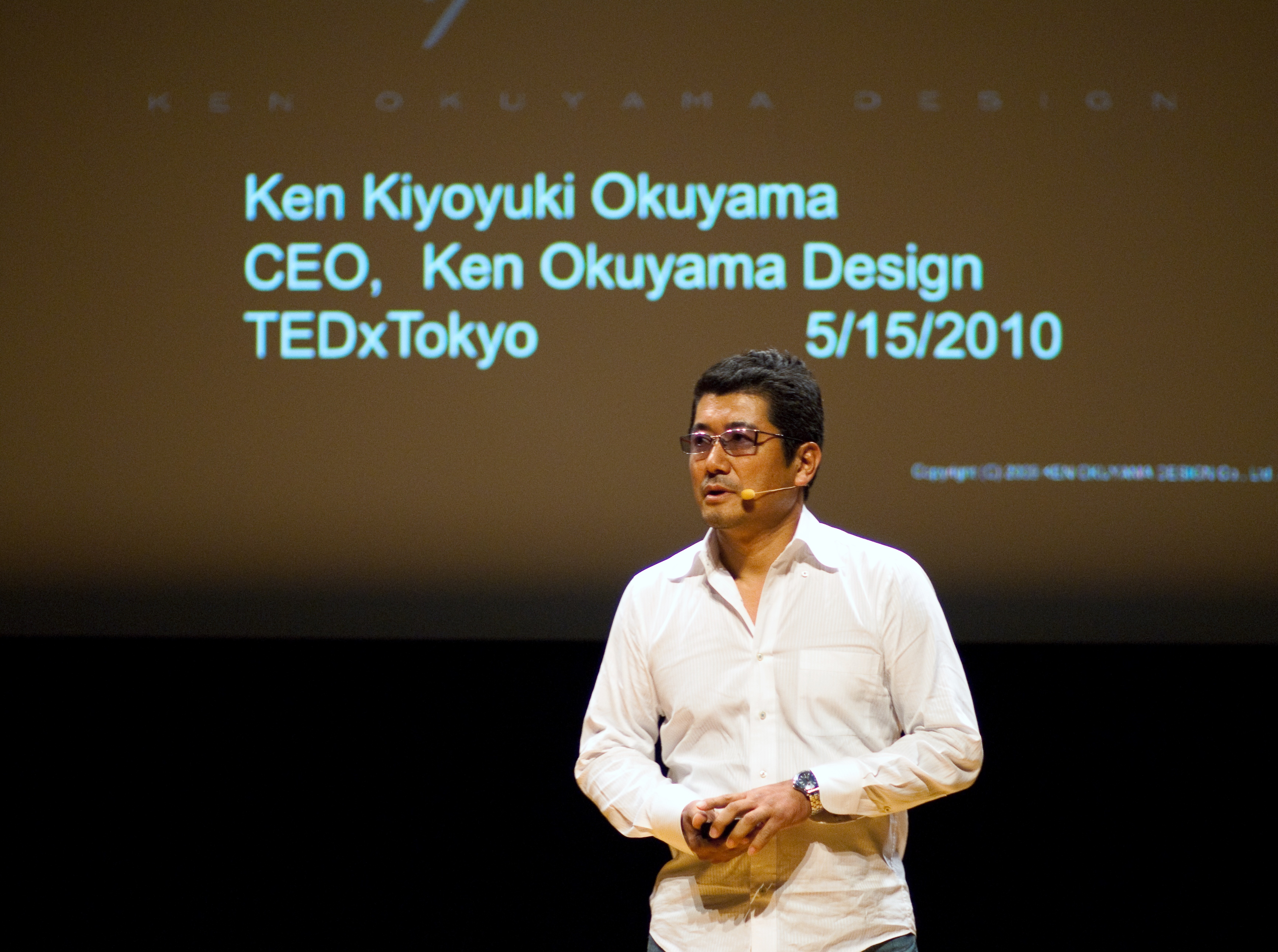
- Okuyama speaking at TEDxTokyo 2010
- Born: 奥山 清行 (Okuyama Kiyoyuki); 1959 (age 66–67); Yamagata, Japan
- Education: Art Center College of Design
- Occupation: Industrial designer
- Organization: Ken Okuyama Design
- Website: www.kenokuyama.jp

Ken Kiyoyuki Okuyama (奥山 清行, Okuyama Kiyoyuki; born 1959) is a Japanese industrial designer. He is the owner of the Ken Okuyama Design company. Okuyama formerly worked for Pininfarina, designing and supervising projects such as the Enzo Ferrari and Ferrari P4/5.

== Career ==
Okuyama graduated in 1986 from the Art Center College of Design in Pasadena, California. For the next three years he was a visiting professor at Tohoku University of Art and Design. In 1991, he returned to teach part-time at the Art Center College of Design. Between 2000 and 2004, he was Chair of the Transportation Design Department at the college, but in 2004 he was offered a job at Pininfarina.

Okuyama worked for General Motors and Porsche, helping design the 996 generation of the Porsche 911 as well as the 986 generation Boxster. Before moving to Pininfarina, he worked for General Motors in the Advanced Concepts Center in California. There he worked on the design for the fourth generation Chevrolet Camaro among other projects.

On 10 May 2004, Ken Okuyama began work as Creative Director at Pininfarina. He had been working with Pininfarina before, supervising the design of the Enzo Ferrari. As Creative Director Ken oversaw projects including the Ferrari 599 GTB Fiorano, Ferrari 456M GT, Ferrari California, Ferrari 612 Scaglietti, Ferrari Rossa (Concept car), Mitsubishi Colt CZC, Maserati Birdcage 75th, Maserati Quattroporte V and Ferrari P4/5.

In 2006, Okuyama left Pininfarina and set up his own design firm, Newton Design Lab. In late 2007, Okuyama launched the Ken Okuyama Eyes collection, an eyewear collection manufactured in Japan.

In 2008, Ken Okuyama presented his first concept car under his own name, the K.O. 7 Spider, a carbon fiber reinforced polymer and unpainted aluminium two-seater. The K.O. 7 was unveiled at the Geneva Motor Show in March 2008. Ken Okuyama has cooperated with the luxury watch producer TAG Heuer, having fitted the TAG Heuer Grand Carrera at the dashboard of the car. The interior of the concept car was inspired by the design of the TAG Heuer watch.

In 2008, Ken Okuyama's design studio produced the first 20 models of the K.O. 7 Spider, already pre-sold to an "inner circle" of the designer's fans. It was followed by the production of 99 cars in 2009 and 99 more in 2010.

In 2016, Ken Okuyama revealed the Kode 57 as an additional member to the limited-edition family, as only five units would be produced. Forbes Magazine stated "Enzo Ferrari Designer Stuns Monterey With Breathtaking Kode 57 Supercar".

On Oct 1, 2022 Okuyama was arrested by Japanese police for speeding. He narrowly avoided spending months in prison after being caught driving an Enzo 55 mph (88 km/h) over the speed limit.

== Projects ==
=== Cars ===
- Pininfarina Metrocubo (concept car)
- Mitsubishi Colt CZC
- KEN OKUYAMA DESIGN・Kode7
- KEN OKUYAMA DESIGN・Kode7 clubman
- KEN OKUYAMA DESIGN・Kode7 SeriesII
- KEN OKUYAMA DESIGN・Kode8
- KEN OKUYAMA DESIGN・Kode9
- KEN OKUYAMA DESIGN・Kode9 Spyder
- KEN OKUYAMA DESIGN・Kode57 Enji
- KEN OKUYAMA DESIGN・Kode61 Birdcage
- KEN OKUYAMA DESIGN・Kode0
- Ferrari 456M GT
- Ferrari Rossa (concept car)
- Ferrari Enzo
- Ferrari 612 Scaglietti
- Ferrari 599 GTB Fiorano
- Ferrari P4/5 (concept car)
- Ferrari California
- Maserati Quattroporte V
- Maserati Birdcage 75th (concept car)
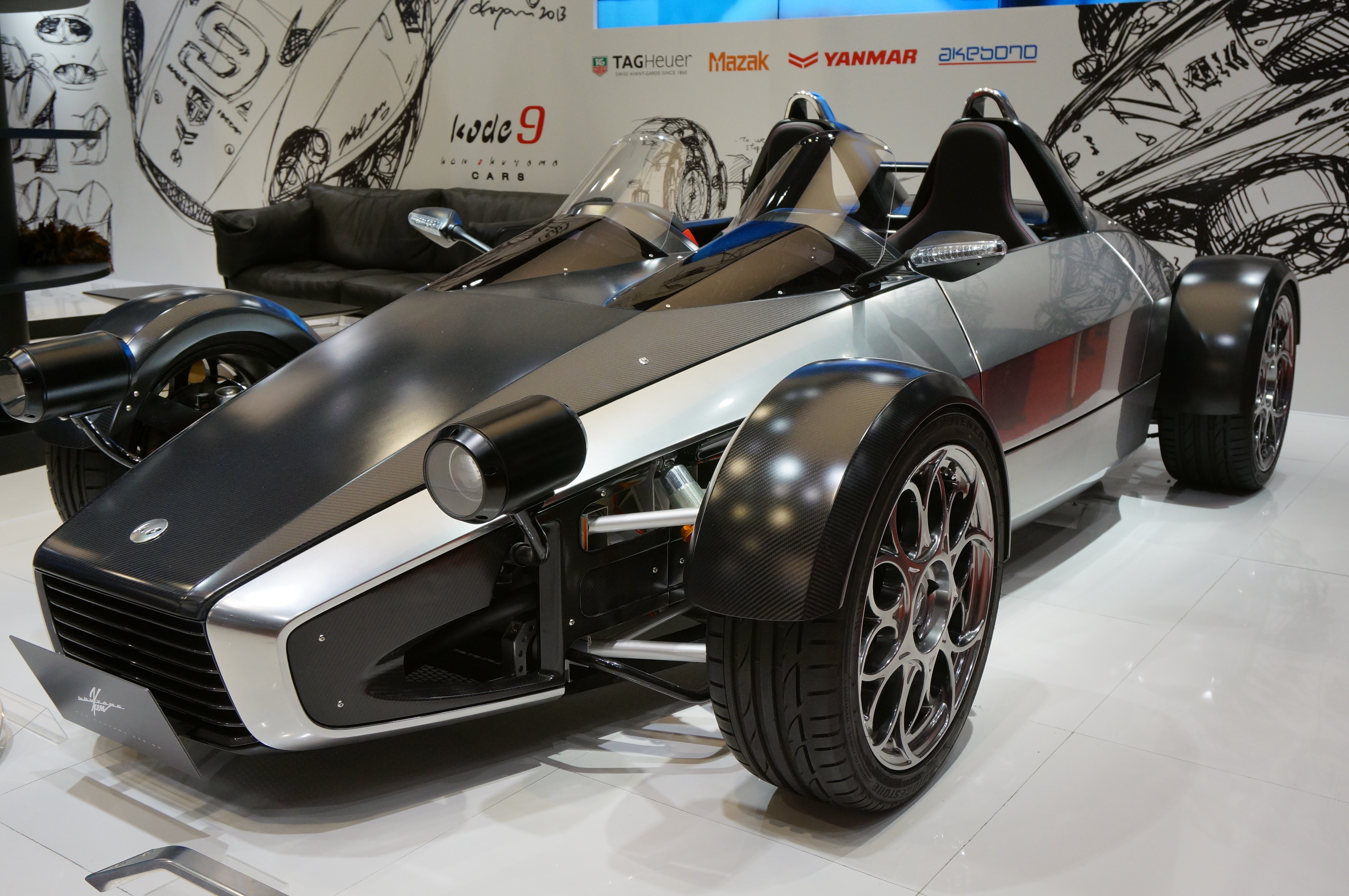
Kode7

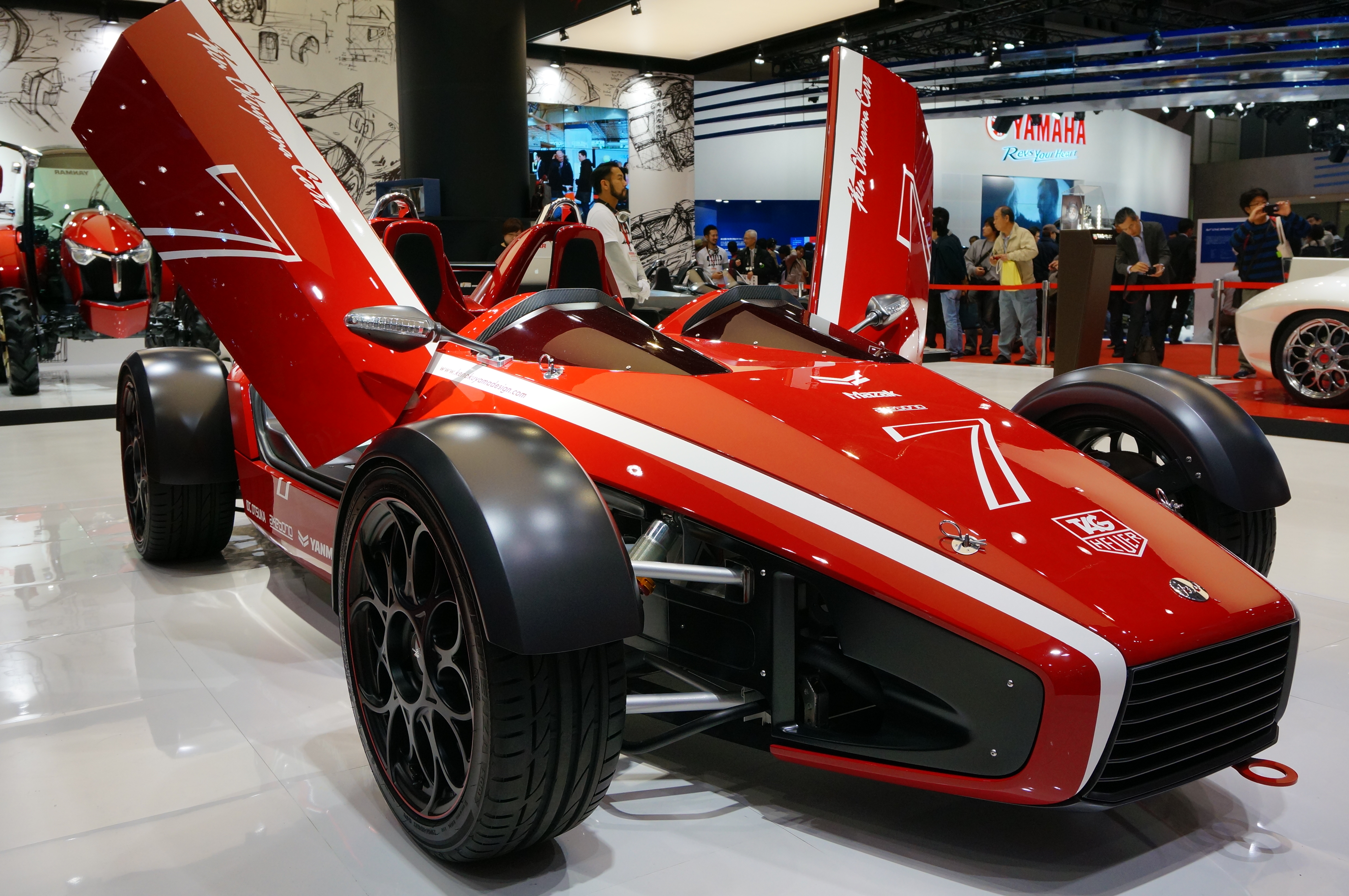
Kode7 Clubman

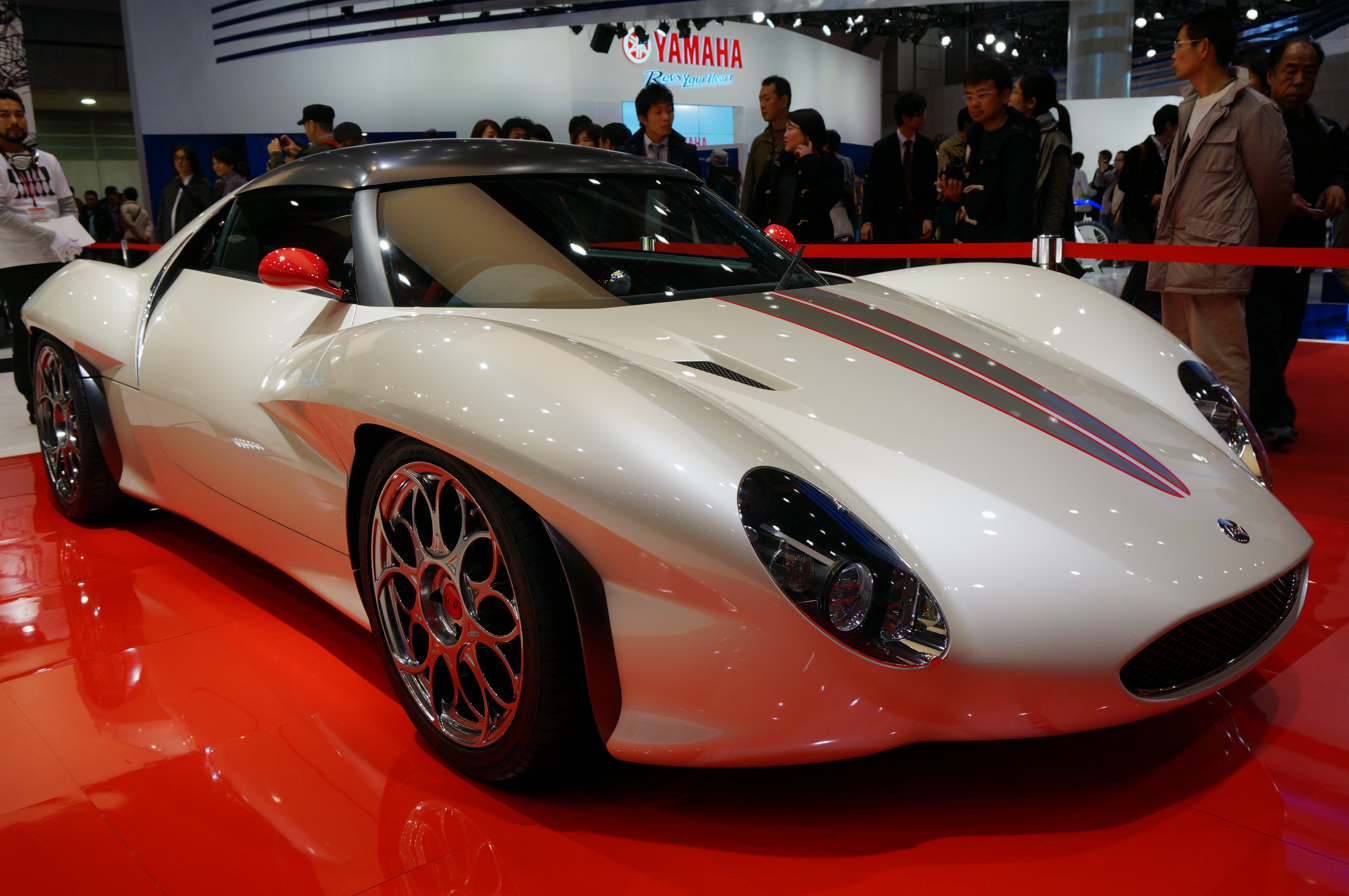
Kode9

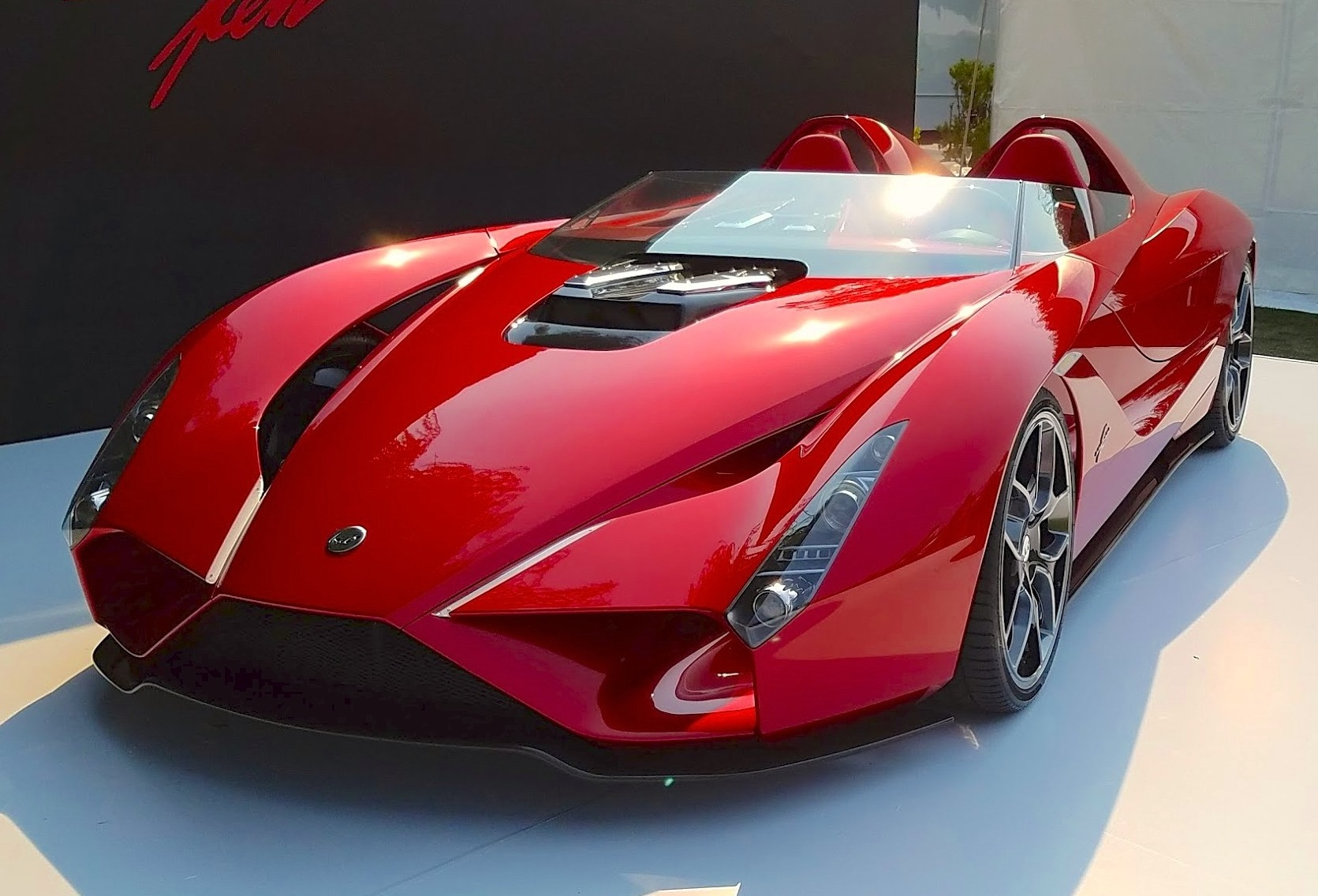
Kode57 Enji

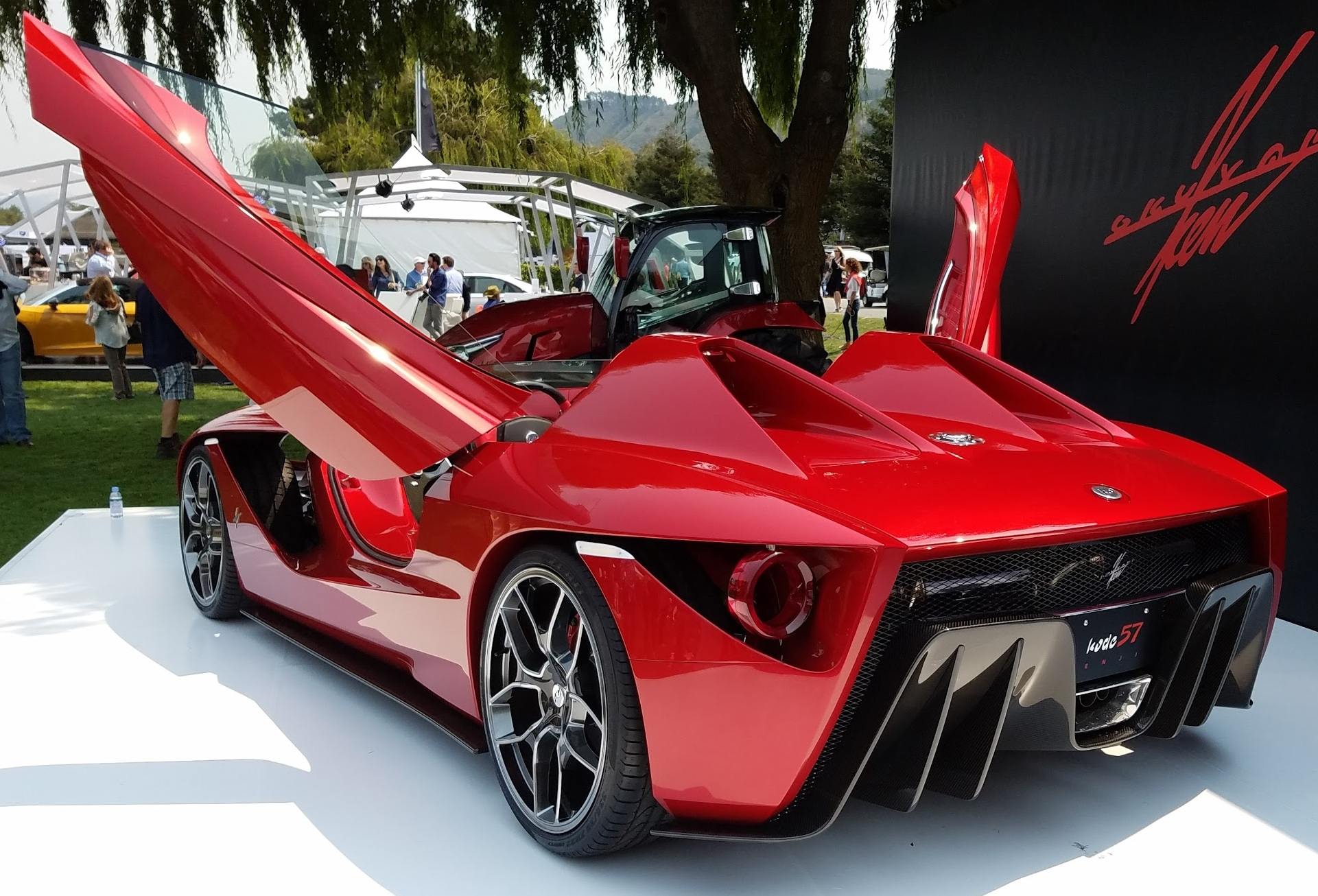
Kode57 Enji rear

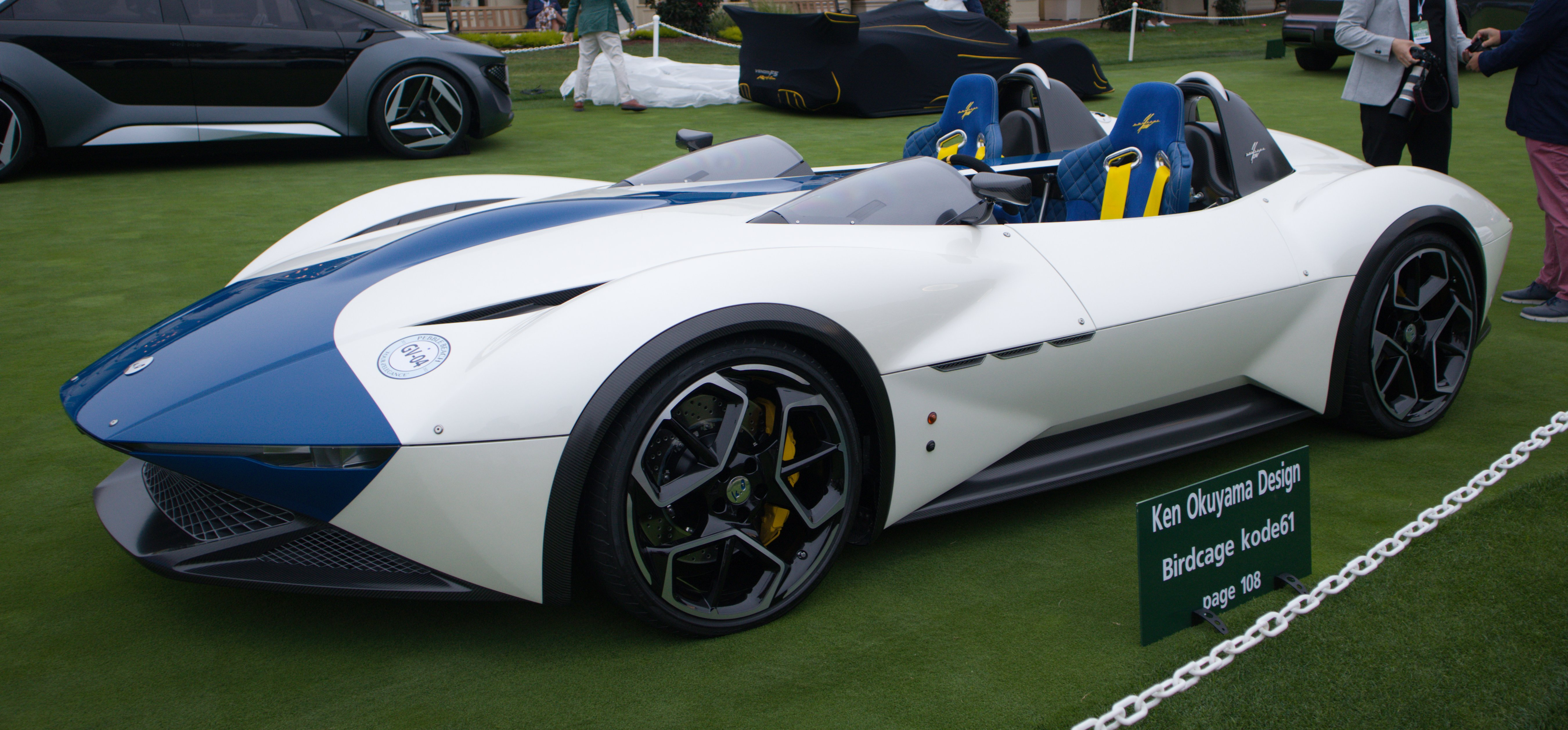
Kode61 Birdcage

=== Railway vehicles ===
- JR East E6 Series Shinkansen, introduced in March 2013
- JR East E7 Series Shinkansen, introduced in March 2014
- Rebuilt KiHa 141 series coaches for the JR East SL Ginga excursion train, introduced on the Kamaishi Line in April 2014
- Revised colour scheme for JR East E3 Series Shinkansen fleet used on Tsubasa services from April 2014
- JR East E3 series Toreiyu excursion train, entering service on the Yamagata Shinkansen from July 2014
- E235 series commuter trains for the Yamanote Line in Tokyo
- JR East E353 series Super Azusa trains entering service in 2015
- HB-E300 series 4-car hybrid DMU set for use on Resort Shirakami - Buna services in the north of Japan from July 2016
- JR East E001 series Train Suite Shiki-shima luxury cruise train
- Tobu 500 series limited express trains entering service in spring 2017
- New trains for the Kobe Municipal Subway Seishin-Yamate Line, entering service in fiscal 2018
- Long Island Railroad M9 entering service in 2019
- Osaka Metro 400 series, entering service in April 2023
- JR East E8 Series Shinkansen, entering service in 2024
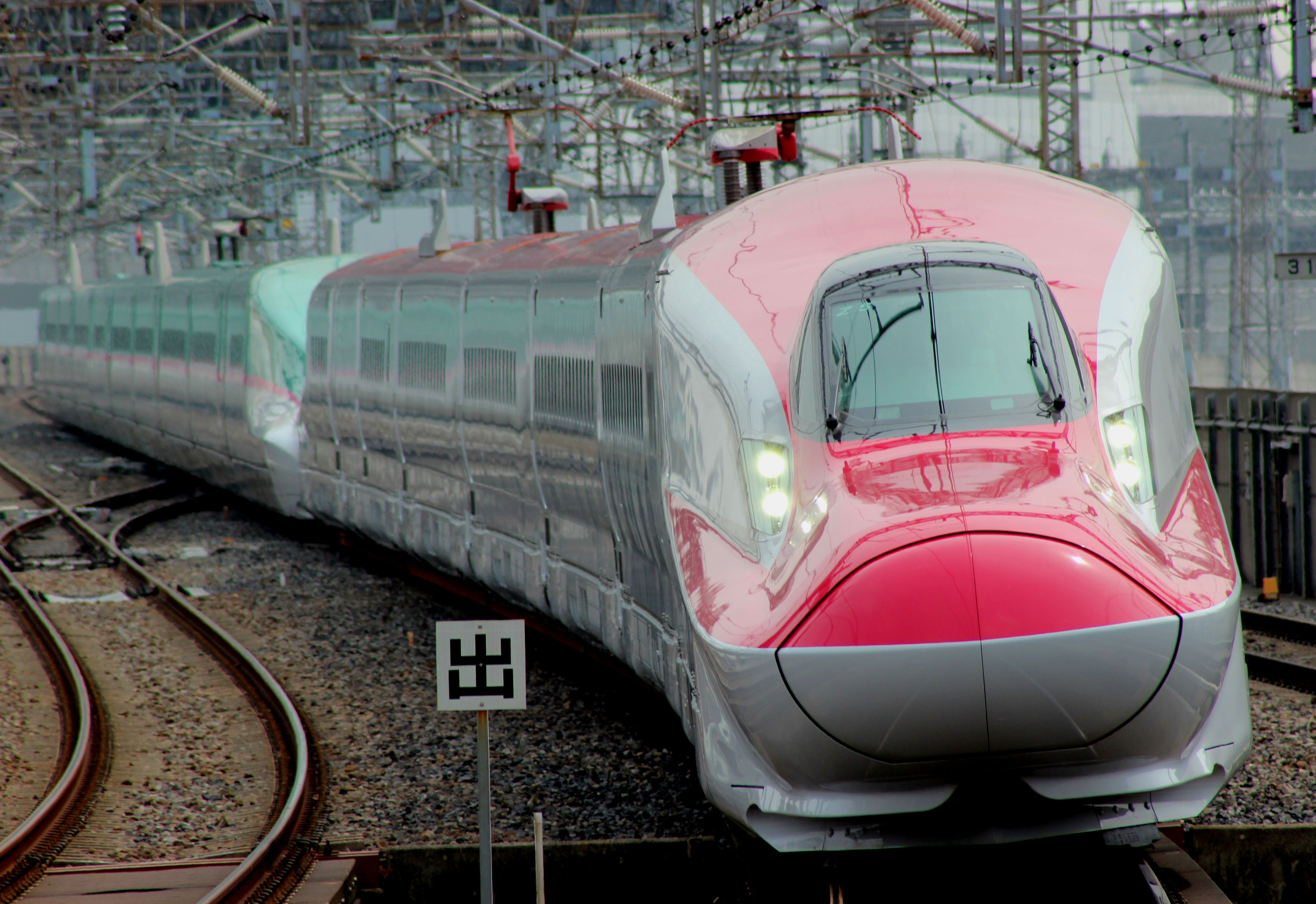
An E6 series shinkansen set in March 2013

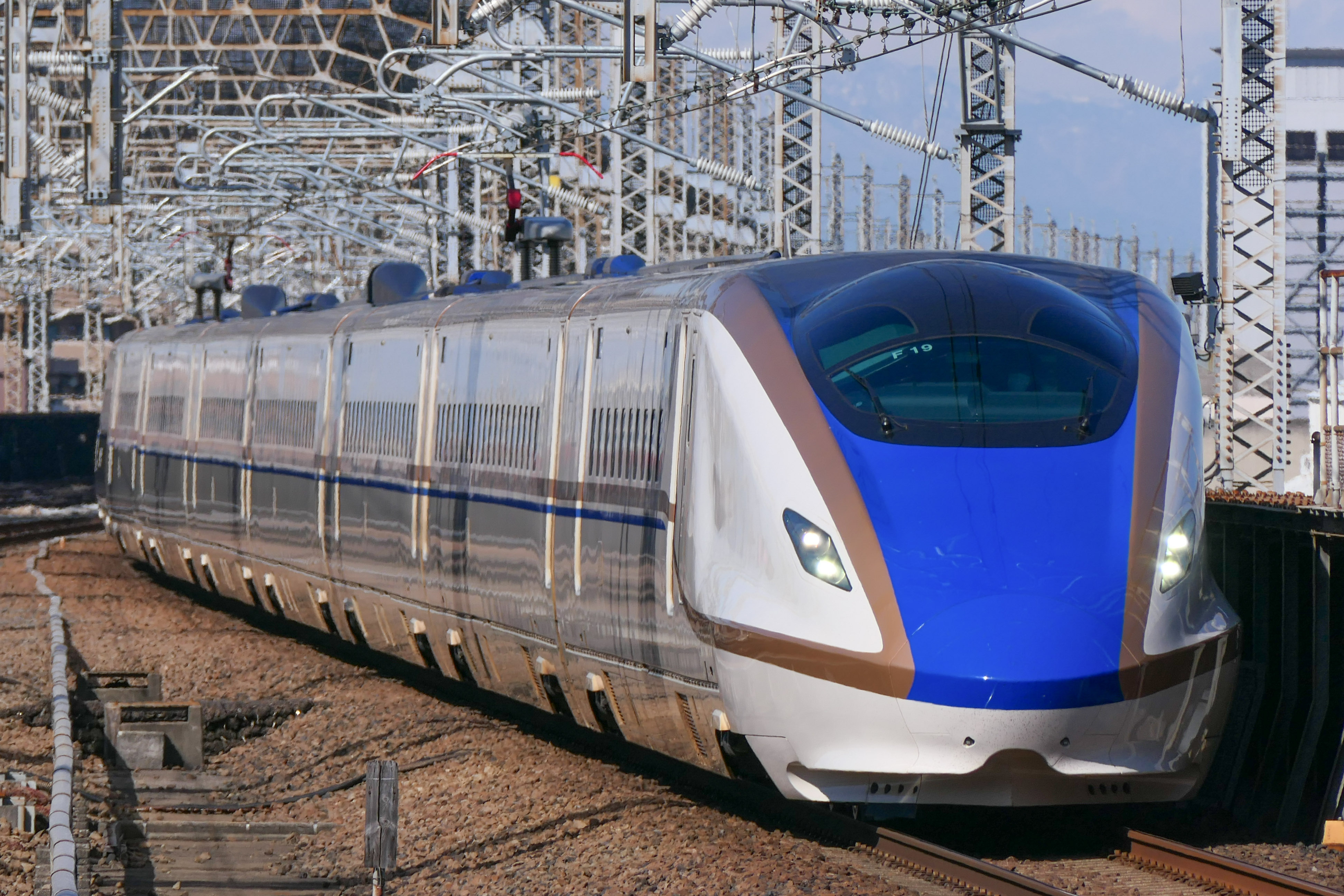
An E7 series shinkansen set in February 2021

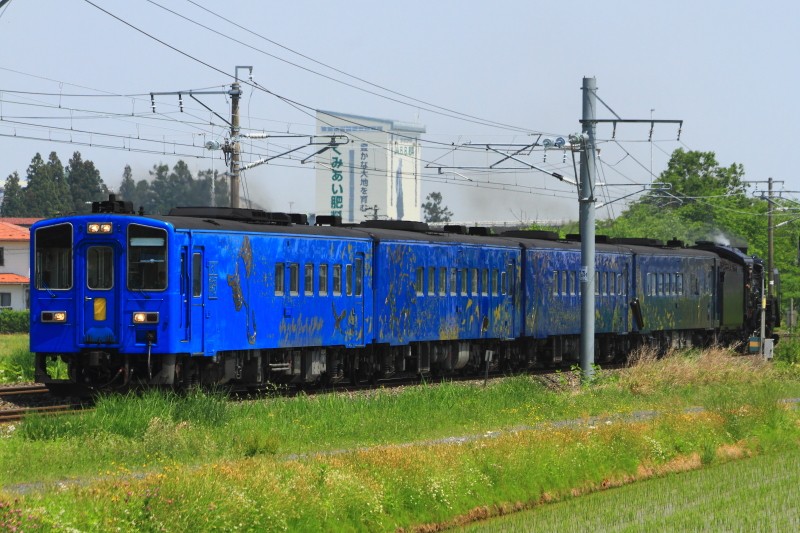
The rebuilt KiHa 141 series cars for the SL Ginga excursion trainset in May 2014

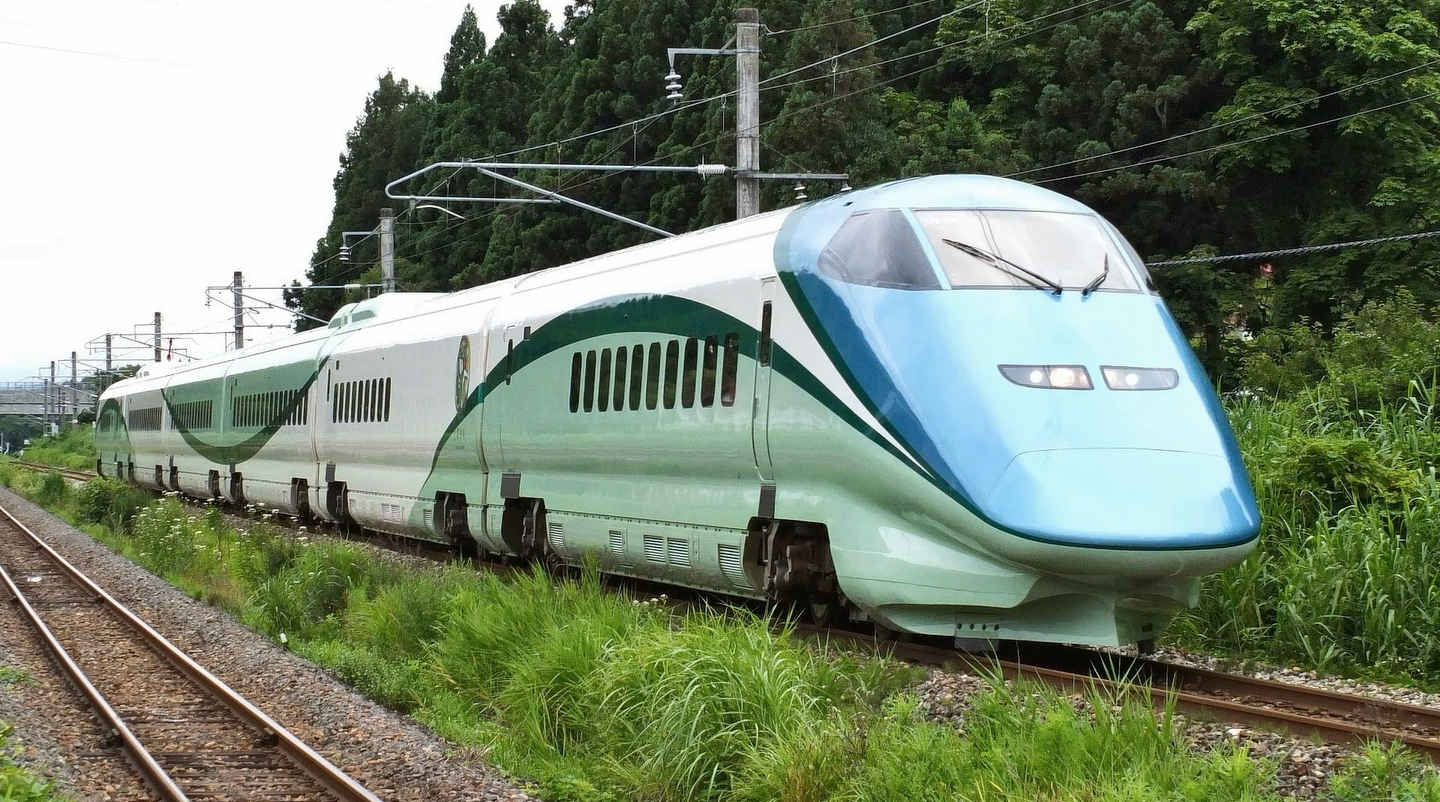
The E3 series Toreiyu excursion trainset in July 2014

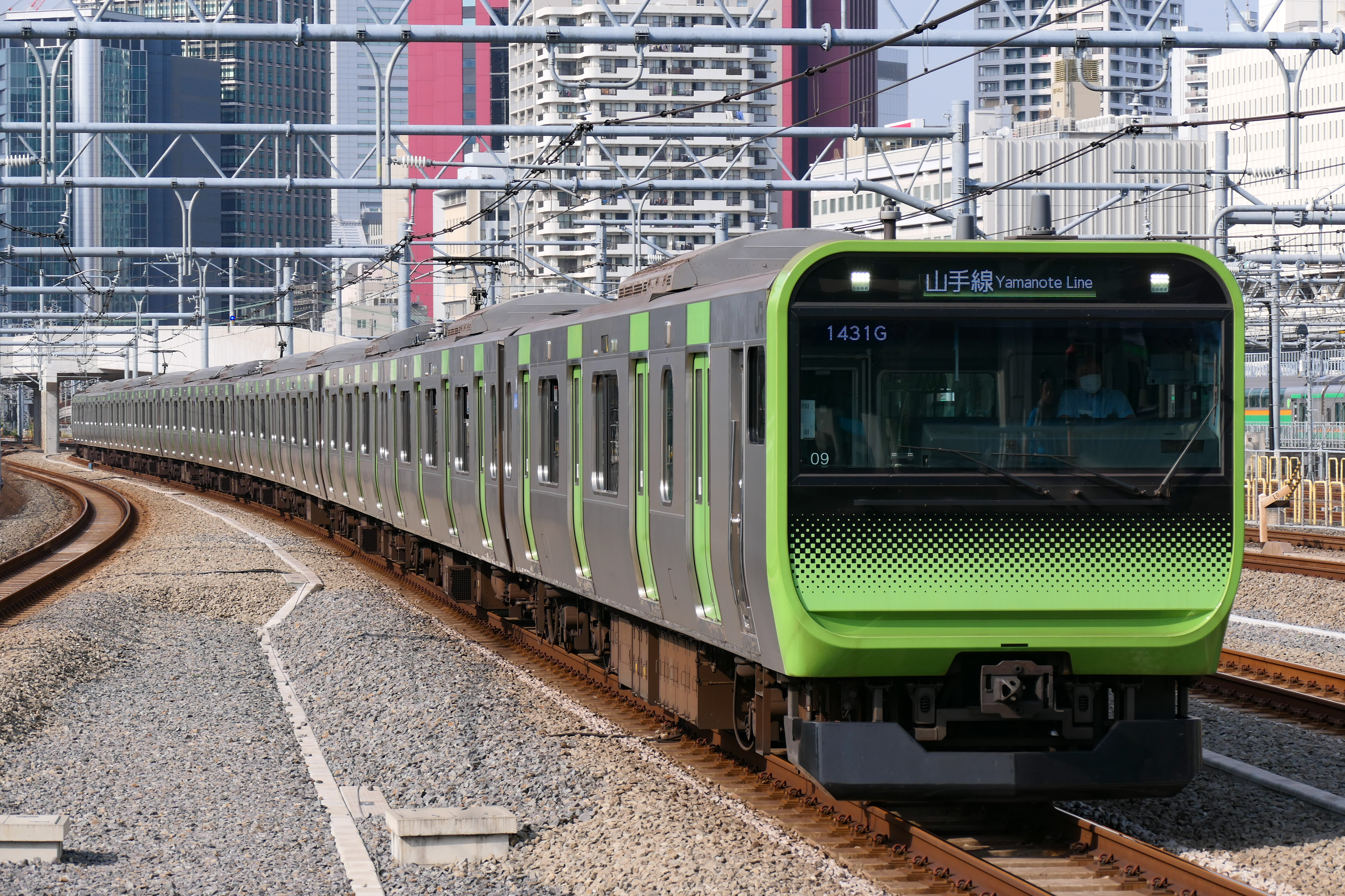
The first E235 series trainset in May 2021

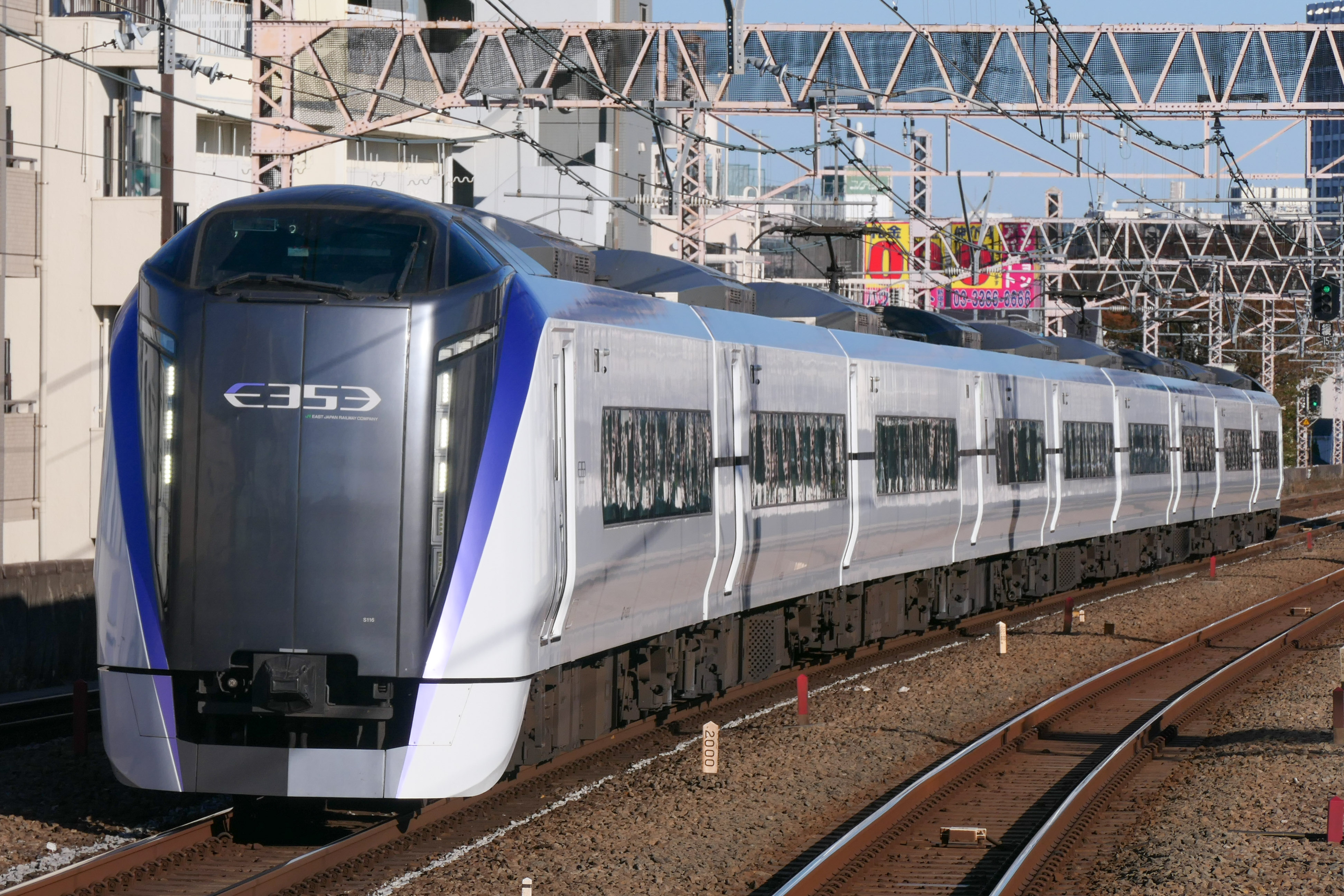
A E353 series trainset in November 2020

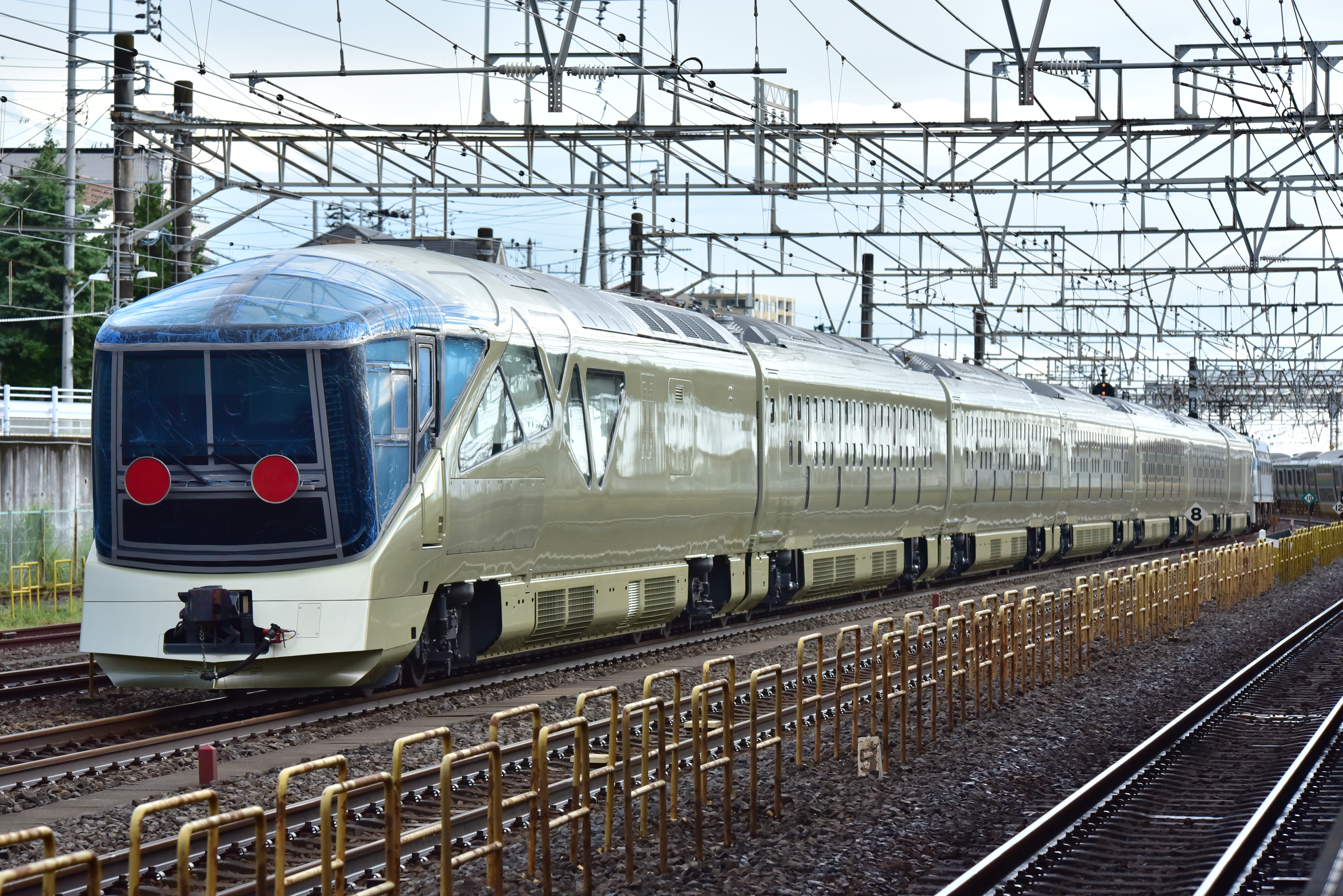
The E001 series Train Suite Shiki-shima cruise train on delivery in September 2016

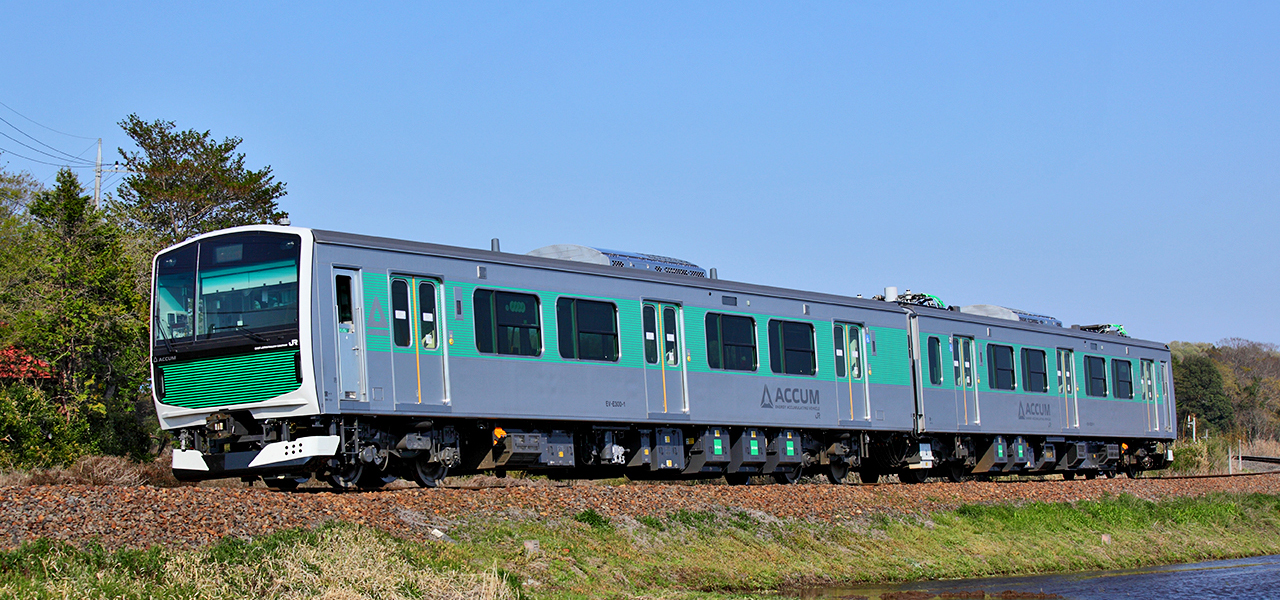
A EV301 series set in April 2014

=== Other projects ===
- OHCO M.8LE (limited edition) massage chair.
- OHCO M.8 massage chair
- OHCO M.DX massage chair
- OHCO R.6 massage chair

Ken Okuyama designed the M-series and R-series massage chairs with a swing door in partnership with Furniture for Life an Inc. 5000 company based in Boulder, Colorado.

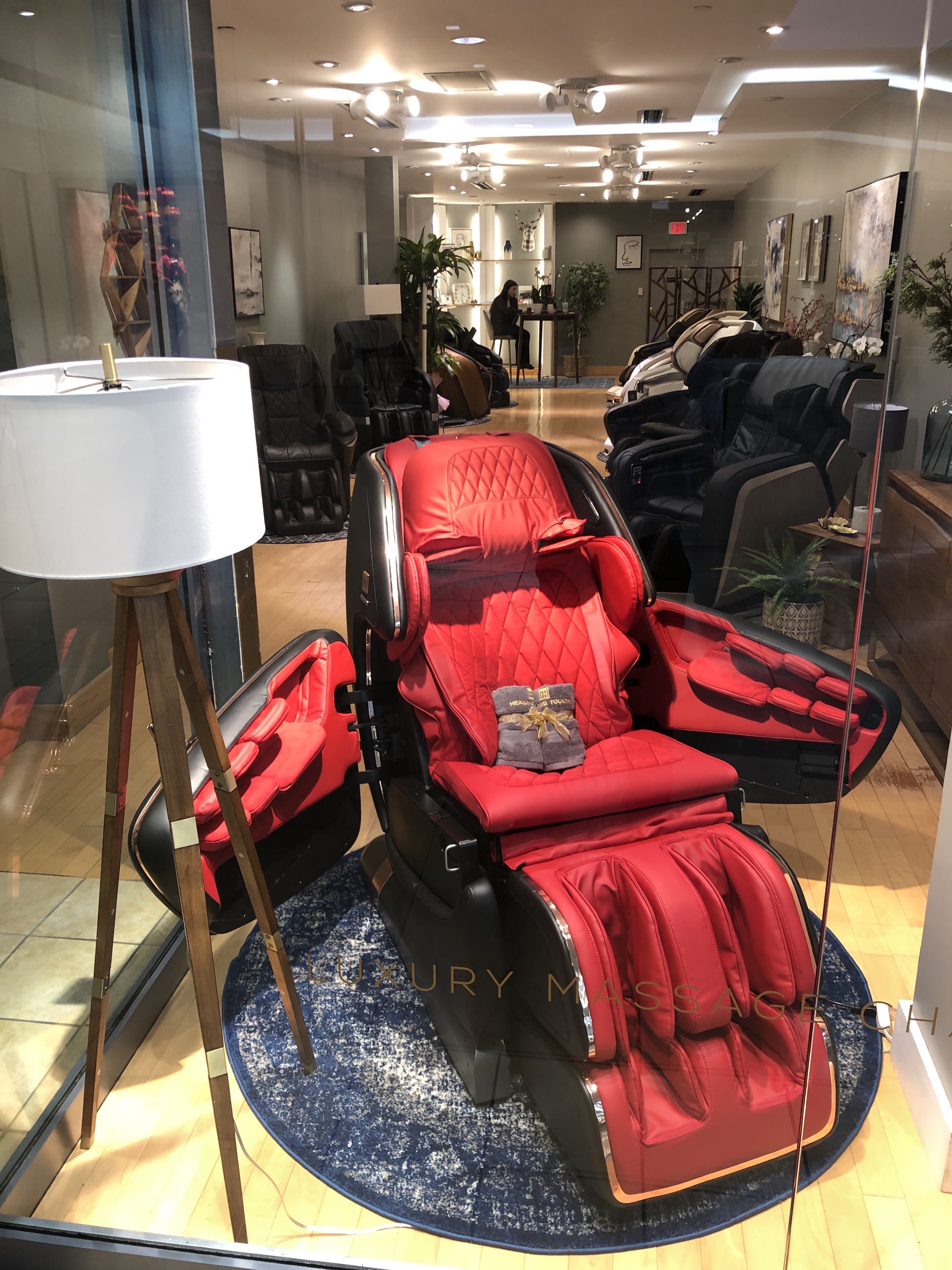
OHCO M.8LE Massage Chair

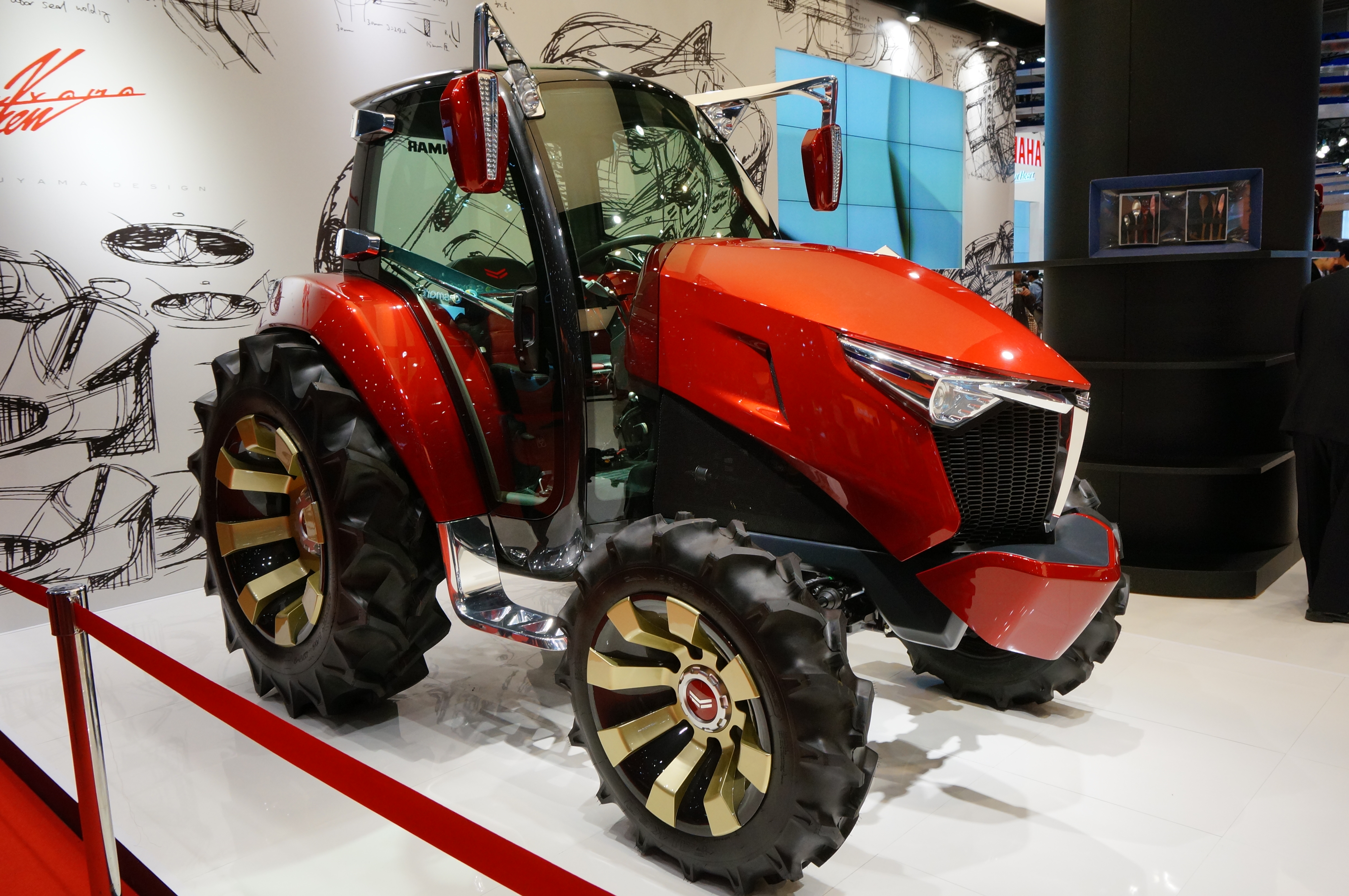
Yanmar YT01
- Gundam G40 (Industrial Design Ver.) (HG)

== Awards ==
The following were awarded to either Ken Okuyama, car, or other project he worked with others to design:

- The Pininfarina Metrocubo won The Best Interior Design of the Year Award in 1999.
- The Ferrari Rossa, designed by Okuyama, won The Best Concept Car of The Year award in 2000.
- The Maserati Birdcage 75th won the Best Concept prize at the Editors Choice Awards by Autoweek.
- The Maserati Birdcage 75th won the Louis Vuitton Classic Concept Award which Pininfarina gave to Okuyama.
- The prestigious Hall of Fame award “La Bella Macchina” was given to Ken Okuyama at Concorso Italiano on August 20, 2016.
- 2019 Consumer Electronics Show Innovation Honor awarded in the Fitness, Sports, and Biotech Category for the OHCO M.8
- 2019 ePDA (European Product Design Award) for the OHCO M.8
- 2019 Pinnacle Award in Furniture for the OHCO M.8
- 2020 Good Design award for the OHCO M.8
