= Ferrari 456 =

Four seat grand tourer manufactured by Ferrari

Ferrari 456; Ferrari 456M
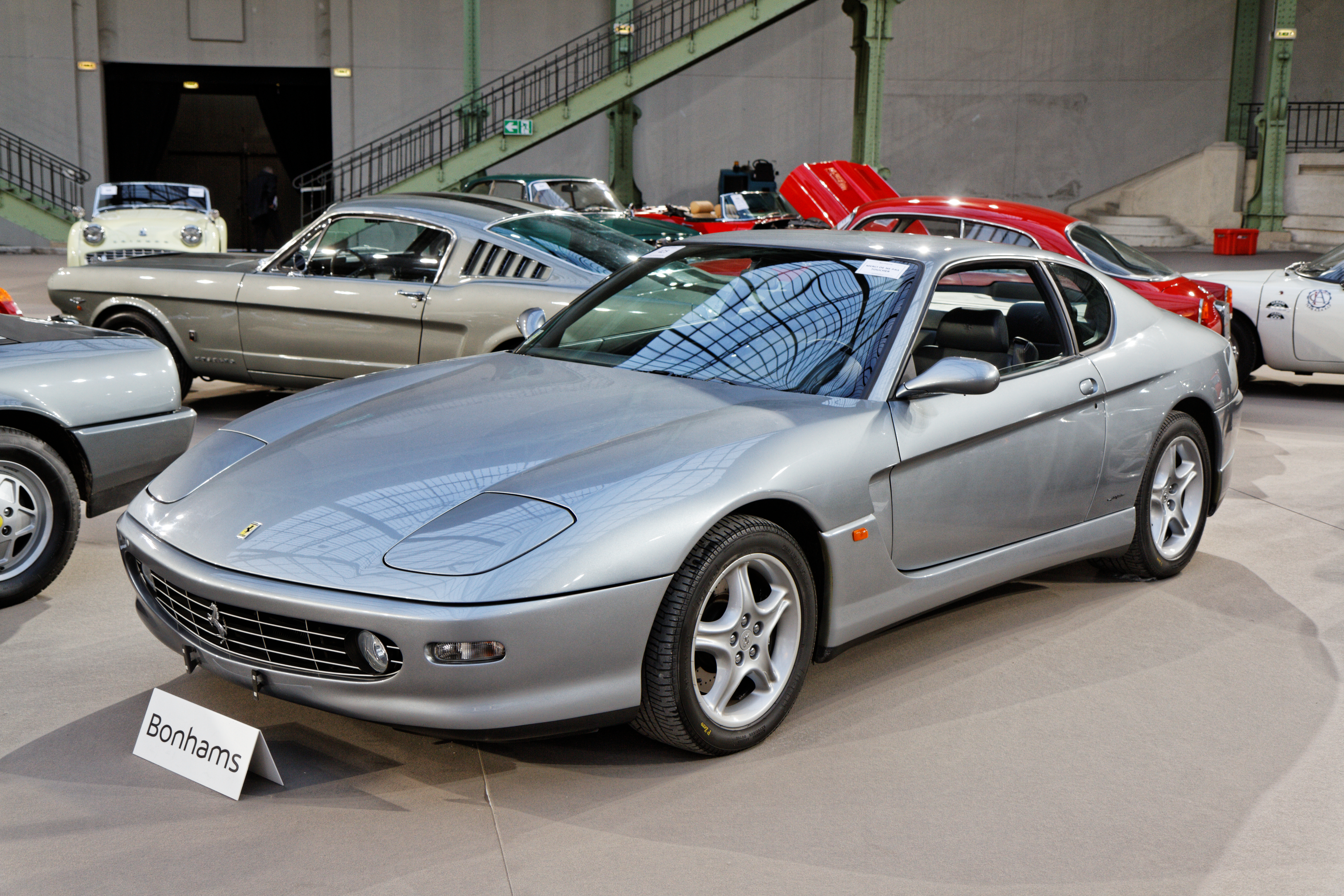
- Ferrari 456M GT

Overview
- Manufacturer: Ferrari
- Production: 16 July 1992–1997 (456); 16 July 1998–2003 (456M)
- Assembly: Italy: Maranello
- Designer: 456: Pietro Camardella and Maurzio Corbi (interior) under Lorenzo Ramaciotti at Pininfarina; 456M: Ken Okuyama at Pininfarina

Body and chassis
- Class: Grand tourer (S)
- Body style: 2-door 2+2 coupé
- Layout: Front-engine, rear-wheel-drive
- Related: Ferrari 550

Powertrain
- Engine: 5.5 L F116 B/C V12
- Transmission: 6-speed manual 4-speed automatic

Dimensions
- Wheelbase: 2,600 mm (102.4 in)
- Length: 4,730 mm (186.2 in); 4,763 mm (187.5 in) (456M)
- Width: 1,920 mm (75.6 in)
- Height: 1,300 mm (51.2 in)
- Kerb weight: 1,690–1,770 kg (3,726–3,902 lb) (dry)

Chronology
- Predecessor: Ferrari 412
- Successor: Ferrari 612 Scaglietti

The Ferrari 456 and 456M (Type F116) are front-engine grand tourers which were produced by Italian automobile manufacturer Ferrari from 1992 to 2003. The 456 succeeded the front-engine 412 as the company's V12-powered four-seater. The updated 456M, which was the last Ferrari model to use pop-up headlamps, was replaced in 2004 by the 612 Scaglietti.

== 456 ==
Introduced in October 1993, the 456 was designed by Pietro Camardella at Pininfarina. The designer took heavy inspiration from the 365 GTB Daytona when designing the car. It was available in GT and (from 1996) GTA trims. The former has a six-speed manual, and the latter has a four-speed automatic developed in partnership with FF Developments, in Livonia, Michigan (which was later purchased by Ricardo Engineering in Great Britain). The automatic transmission used in the 456 was the second and last conventional hydraulic automatic transmission with a torque converter to be offered by Ferrari (The transmission found its first use in the 400/412 series). The 5,473.91 cc (5.5 L) 65° V12 engine was derived from the Dino V6 rather than the more conventional 60° V12s used in the 412 and Daytona. It is rated at 325 kW; 436 hp (442 PS), with 4 valves per cylinder and Bosch Motronic M2.7 engine management. Ferrari claims it could push the 1,690 kg (3,726 lb) car to a top speed of 309 km/h (192 mph), making it, at the time, the world's second fastest production four-seater automobile behind the Porsche 959. Acceleration from 0-97 km/h (60 mph) takes 4.8 seconds, with a 13.3 second quarter-mile time (400 m). At the time of its development, the 456 was the most powerful regular production road car ever developed by Ferrari. In 1996, the engine management system was changed to a Motronic M5.2 management and the engine with the updated system was given the F116C code. The V12 in the 456 is considered by some to be one of Ferrari’s more reliable engines, not having many of the major issues and servicing requirements of other Ferrari models.

The name 456 is derived from the fact that each cylinder displaces 456 cubic centimeters. This was the last Ferrari to use this naming convention until the 488 GTB. A further developed version of this engine was used in the front-engine 550 Maranello grand tourer introduced in 1996, which became the most powerful naturally aspirated Ferrari production car aside from the 456.

The chassis is a tubular steel space-frame construction with a one-piece composite bonnet and body panels made from aluminium. The body panels are welded to the chassis via a special "sandwich filler" called feran that, when laid between, allows steel and aluminium to be welded. Pininfarina was responsible for the bodywork of the 456 until 1996 when production was moved to Ferrari. The total number of 456 bodies made by Pininfarina amounts to 1,435.

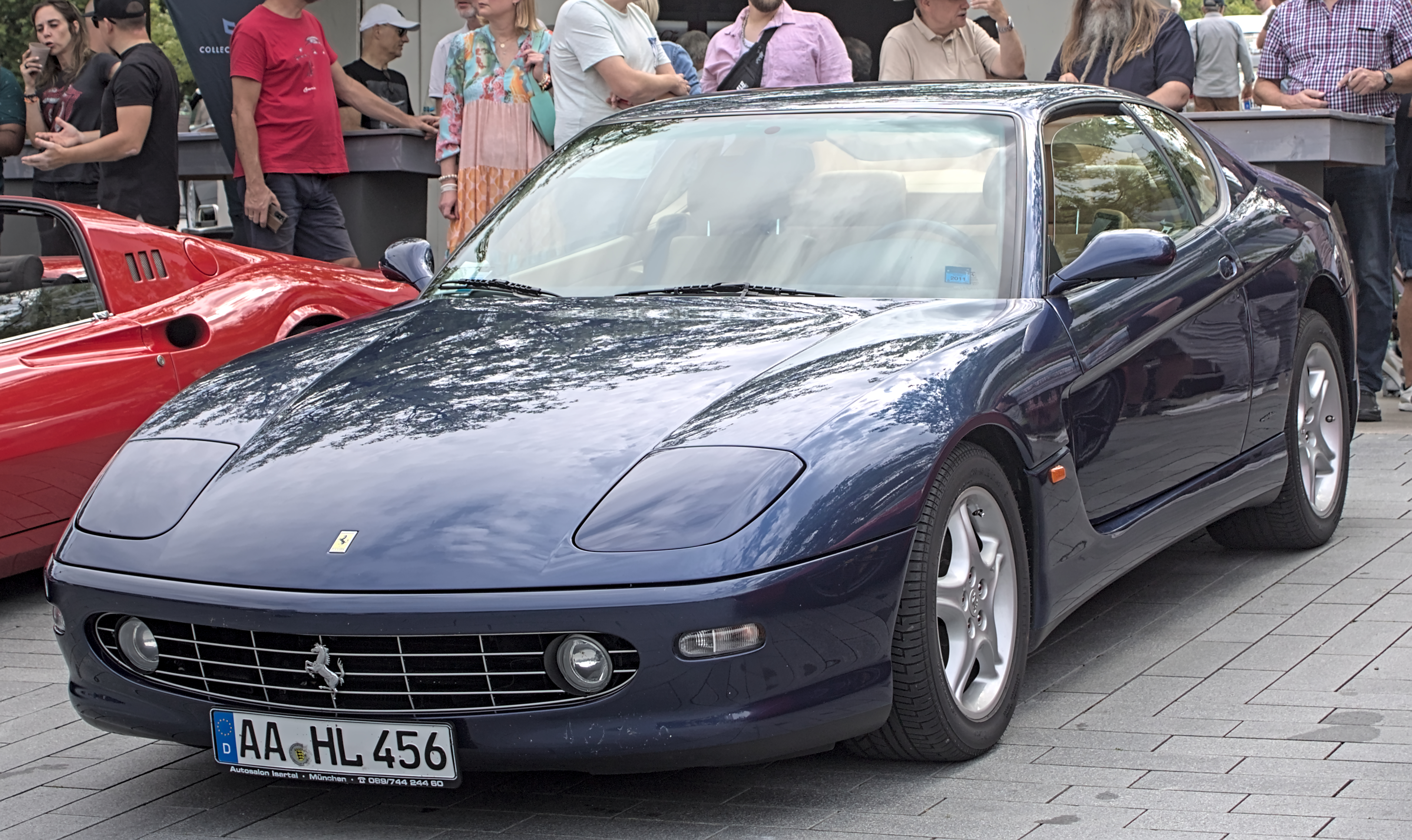
Ferrari 456

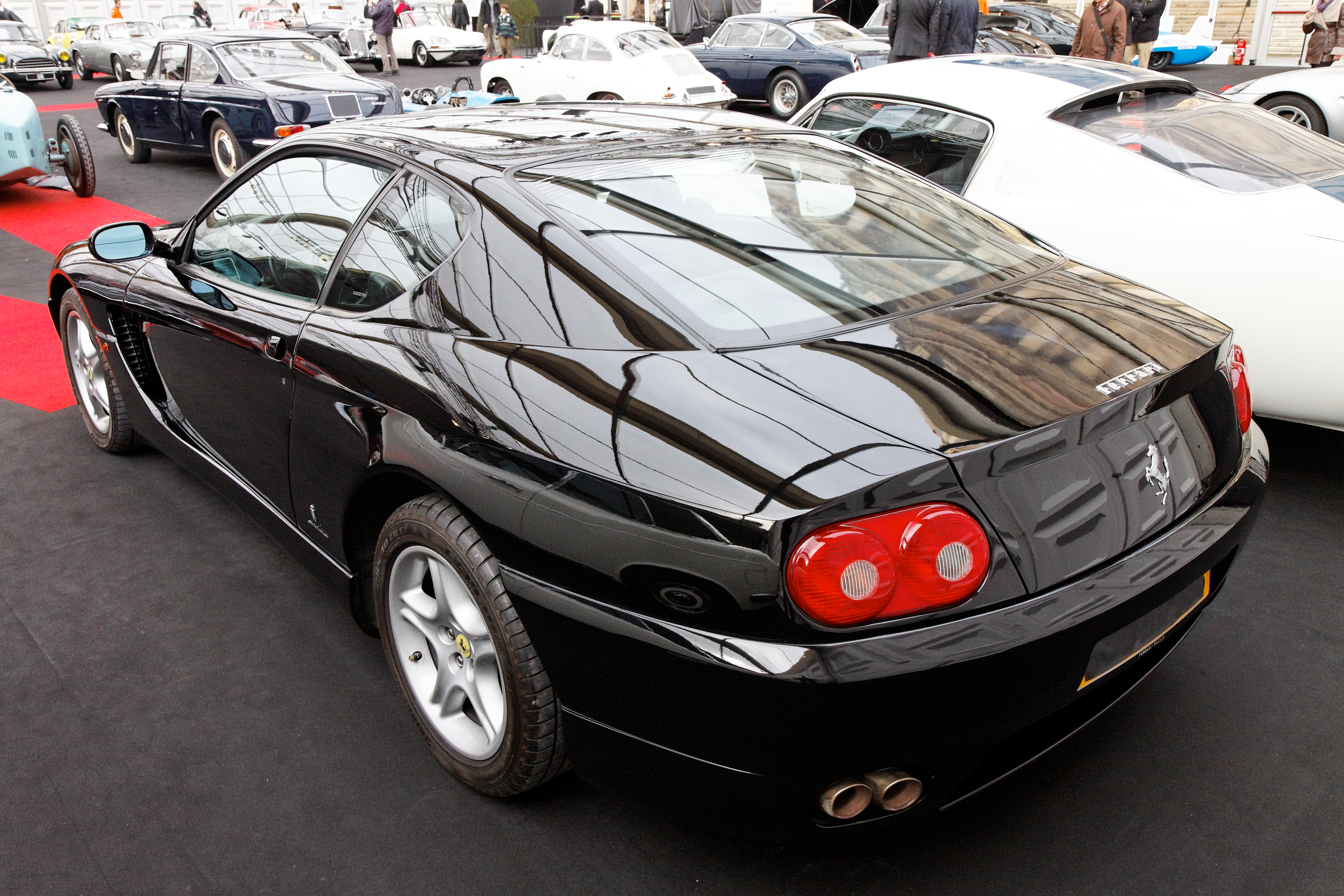
Ferrari 456 M GT (rear view)

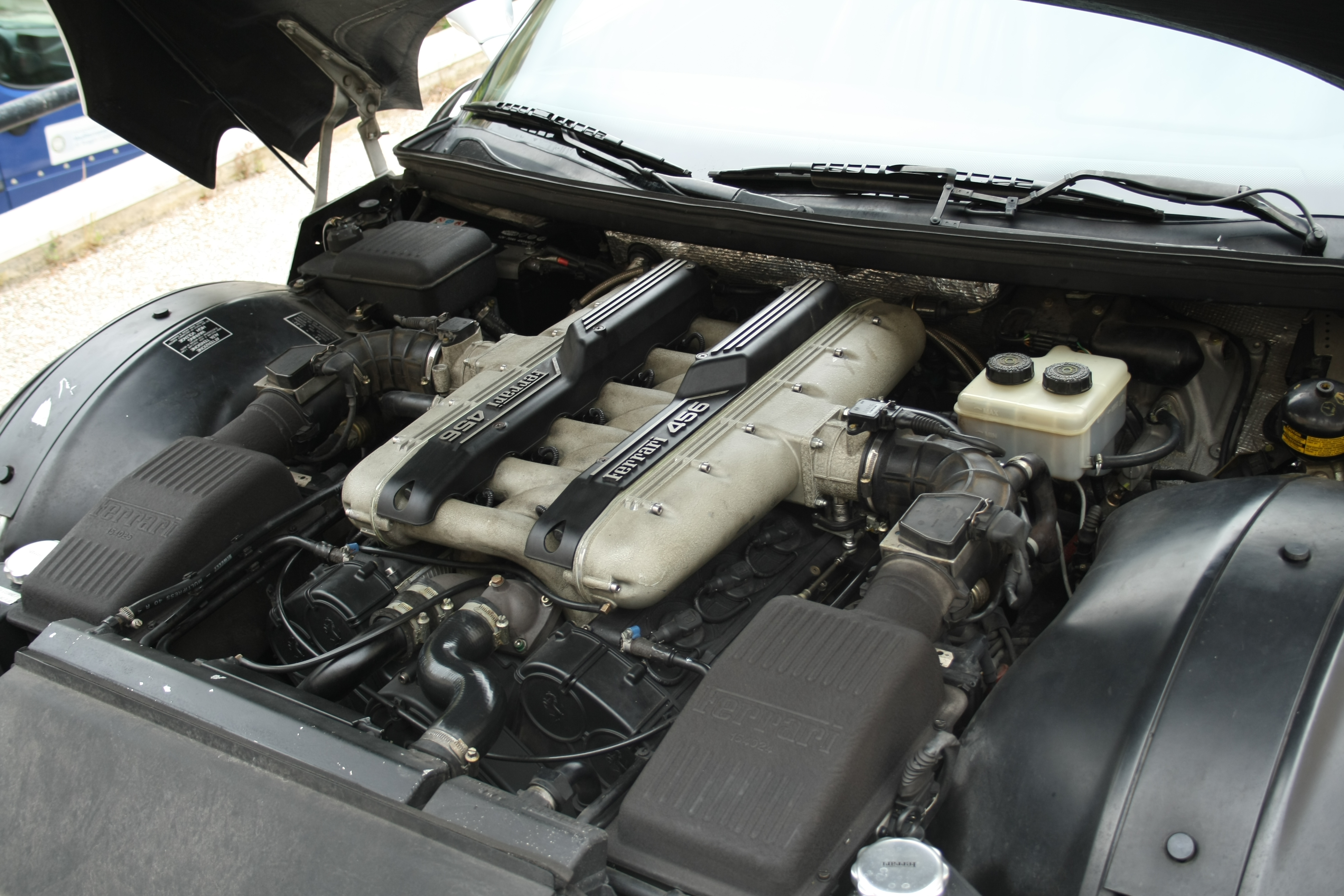
Engine

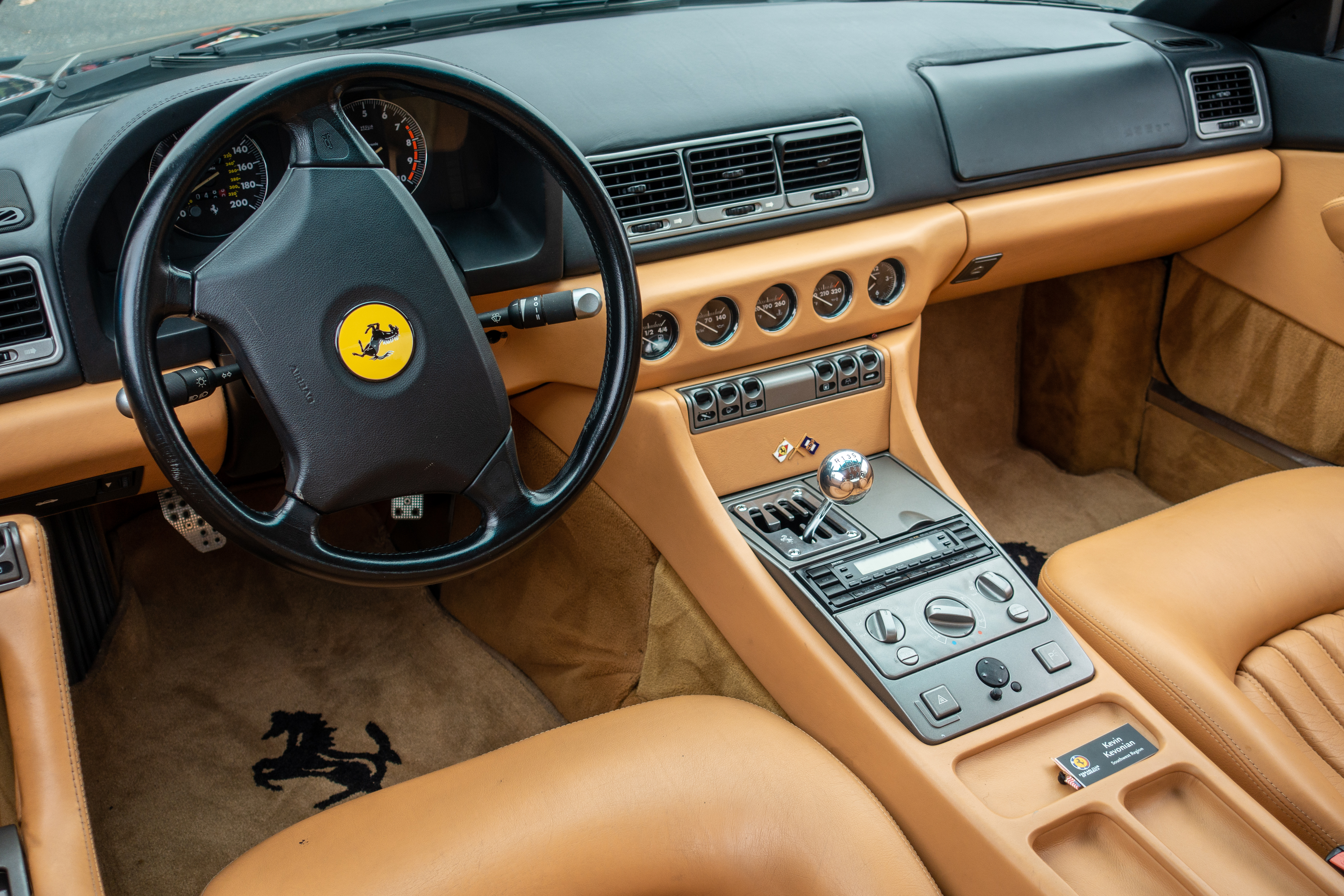
Interior

== 456M ==
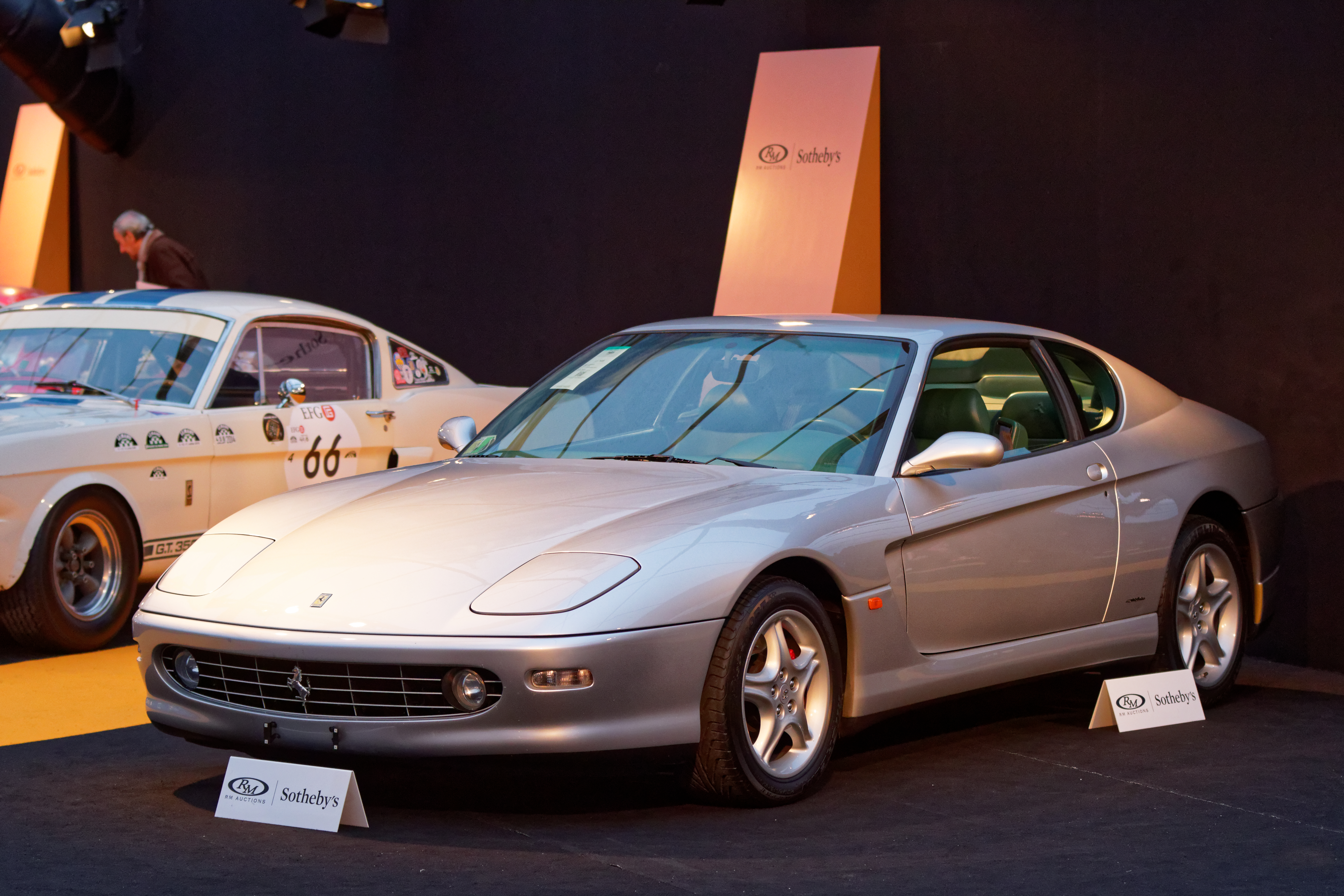
Ferrari 456M GTA

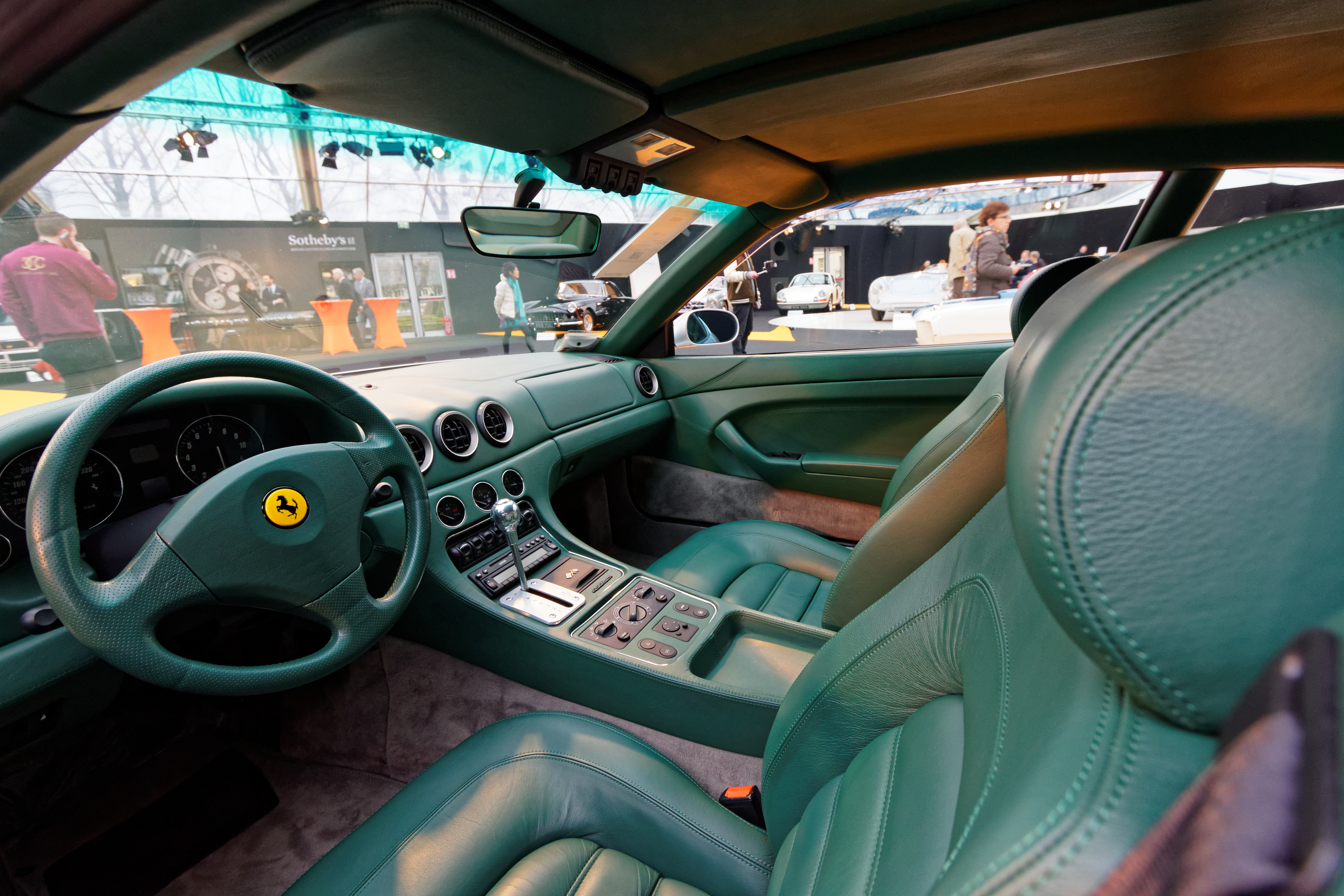
Updated interior of the GTA with circular HVAC design and modern touches

The 456M (M standing for Modificata) was unveiled in March 1998 at the Geneva Motor Show. Many changes were made to improve aerodynamics and cooling and the interior – still featuring Connolly Leather – was refreshed with new seats and other conveniences (three gauges on the dash instead of five, a new Becker stereo fitted in front of the shifter rather than behind as in the very shallow and special Sony head unit in the 456 GT and a revised real parcel shelf now featuring an integrated high level brake light). The intake ducts present on the bonnet on the original 456 were removed for a cleaner appearance and the size of the combined side markers/indicator lights was reduced. The brake ducts present on the apron of the original 456 were removed in favour of a larger intake located at the front of the car. The front suspension geometry now consisted of modified control arms to reduce dive under heavy braking and larger, 330 mm brake discs from the 550 Maranello were used at the front. At the rear of the car, a new bumper with a reshaped license plate housing was added along with a fixed undercarriage spoiler (the older 456 had a motorised spoiler that began its deployment above 105 km/h (65 mph)). This worked in conjunction with a new panel manufactured from fiberglass and PVC. The aerodynamic improvements to the 456M resulted in the car being 33 mm (1 in) longer than the 456.

The bonnet was the first commercial application of carbon fibre, the previous being made of a composite material. Power output remained unchanged on the Modificata using Bosch Motronic M5.2 engine management at 442 PS (325 kW; 436 hp); the cylinder firing order was changed for smoother running and the torque remained the same for later versions of the 456 GT.

=== 456 Bicolore Scaglietti ===
The 456 Bicolore Scaglietti was launched at the 2002 Geneva Motor Show. The show car present at the stand was commissioned by then Ferrari F1 racing driver Michael Schumacher. Customers could work with the Carrozzeria Scaglietti personalisation programme to create a highly individual car. The car has a two-colour paint scheme with the roof, exterior mirrors and wheels painted Canna Di Fucile (Gunmetal Grey) whilst the rest of the body was painted Grigio Nuvolari. The car also featured a custom grey leather interior with red stitching featuring a plaque containing Schumacher's signature and Formula 1 racing championship years, power adjustable seats with position memory settings, dual zone climate control, reworked gauges with a 354 km/h (220 mph) speedometer, an uprated handling pack, and cross-drilled Brembo brakes. Cars equipped with an automatic transmission would be thus designated as a Tipo 456M GT(A) Scaglietti. The car is also known as the 456M GT "Schumacher Edition" as Schumacher was the first to commission the car. A total of 30 cars were produced, with only 10 being made with the 6-speed manual transmission.

== Production ==
The total production of the 456 amounted to 3,289 units. These consisted of the following versions:

456: 1,951

- 456 GT: 1,548
- 456 GTA: 403

456M: 1,338

- 456M GT: 688
- 456M GTA: 650

== Performance ==
According to manufacturer estimates, the 456 GT can attain a top speed of 309 km/h (192 mph) and can accelerate from 0-100 km/h (62 mph) in 5.2 seconds. The GTA can attain the same acceleration at 5.5 seconds. The Modificata models had the same performance statistics as their respective predecessors.

Car & Driver magazine test results for 1995 456 GT were:

- Acceleration (seconds) : 0-97 km/h (60 mph): 4.8
- Standing quarter-mile, sec/mph: 13.3/107
- Braking 70-0 mph: 170 ft
- Lateral acceleration: 0.89 g

Road & Track magazine test results for the 1995 456 GT were:

- Acceleration: 0-97 km/h (60 mph): 5.1 seconds
- Standing quarter-mile: 13.4 seconds at 108.8 mph
- Braking 60-0 mph: 124 ft

Road & Track magazine test results for the 1997 456 GTA were:

- Acceleration: 0-97 km/h (60 mph): 5.1 seconds
- Standing quarter-mile: 13.6 seconds 103 mph
- Braking 60-0 mph: 120 ft
- Lateral acceleration: 0.93 g

Motor Trend magazine's test results for the 1997 456 GTA were:

- Acceleration: 0-97 km/h (60 mph): 4.9 seconds
- Standing quarter-mile: 13.3 seconds 105.2 mph
- Braking 60-0 mph: 114 ft
- Lateral acceleration: 0.88 g
- Top Speed, 177 mph

== Other body styles ==
While the 456 2+2 coupé was the only version offered to the general public, five other bodystyles were made on special request of specific customers:

- Ferrari 456 GT Saloon: At least three of these 4-door saloons (sedans) were built by Pininfarina especially for the Sultan of Brunei.
- Ferrari 456 GT Venice: A series of seven 5-door estate (wagon) commissioned by Prince Jefri Bolkiah of Brunei. After Pininfarina designed and built them, the prince purchased six. It is unknown if the seventh car was purchased by a private car collector or if the remaining car was actually used as a development mule for testing. Each car is rumoured to have cost the Sultan's brother around US$1.5 million. The first Ferrari estate ever built.
- Ferrari 456 GT Spyder: A convertible version of the 456, of which two were built by Pininfarina specially for the Sultan of Brunei.
- Ferrari 456 GT Cabriolet: There are also three aftermarket conversions made by the R. Straman Company of Costa Mesa, California, one of which was purchased by boxer Mike Tyson.
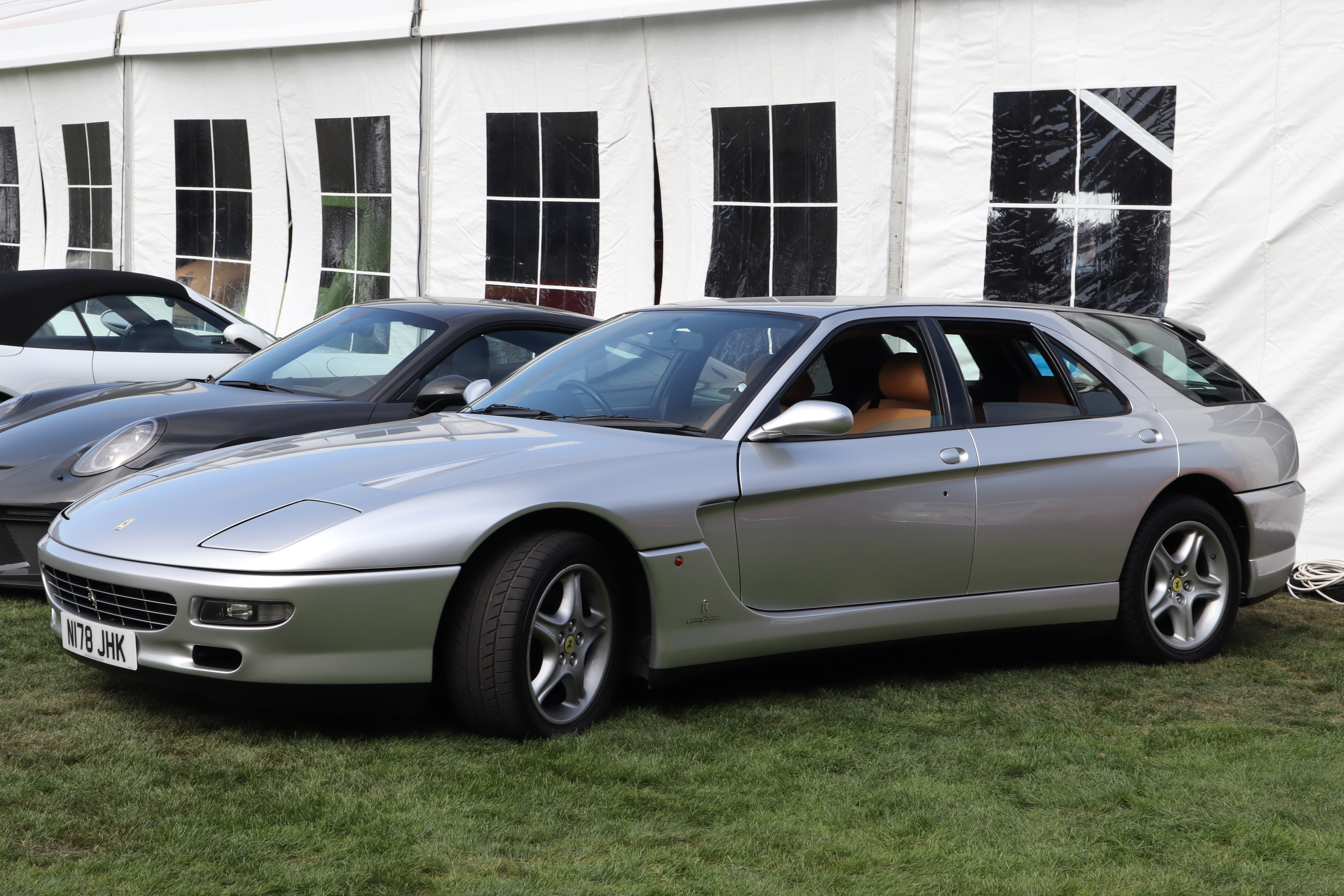
456 GT Venice

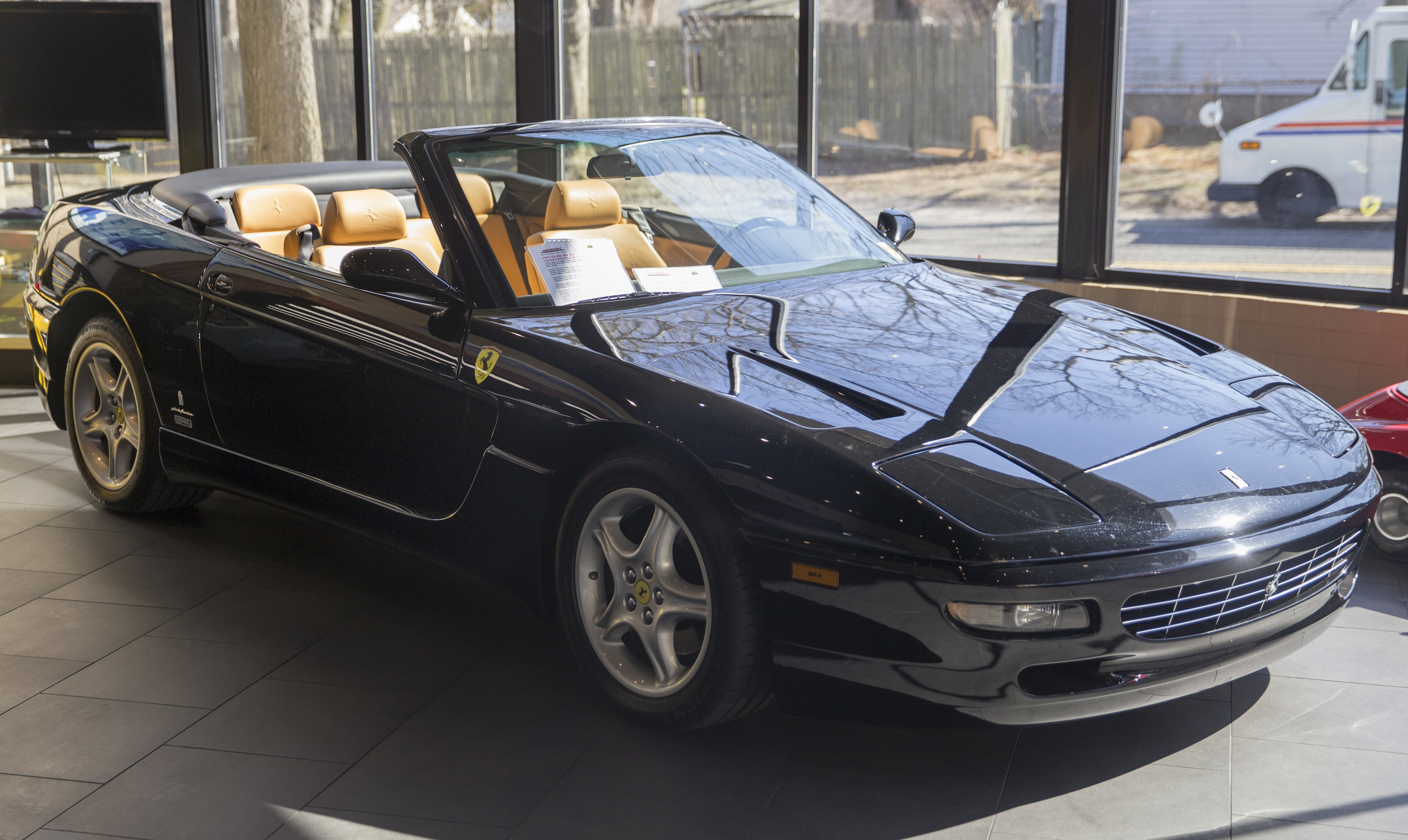
One of three convertibles built by R. Straman

== Awards ==
The 5.5 L V12 engine used in the 456 won the "over 4-litre" class of the International Engine of the Year award for 2000 and 2001.
