= Carlo Bonzanigo =

Italian and Swiss car designer

Carlo Bonzanigo is an Italian and Swiss car designer who has worked for many years for the famous Italian Design House Pininfarina and for Citroën Design.

From 2015 to late 2016, he was director of the Automotive Division of Q-ID Industrial Design, Director of the Design Studio Q-Red in Maranello, Italy, and consultant for Ferrari Design, Maranello. From January 2017 to December 2019 he has been Senior Vice President Design at Pininfarina in Cambiano, near Turin.

== Biography ==
Carlo Bonzanigo was born in Lugano in 1966. He holds a Bachelor of Arts in Transportation Design from the Art Center College of Design and a Master of Science in Mechanical Engineering (specialization in Aeronautical Engineering) from the Swiss Federal Institute of Technology (ETHZ) in Zurich, Switzerland.

== Career ==
He began his career as a designer in 1995 with Pininfarina Design in Turin. A few years later, as Design Manager under Lorenzo Ramaciotti, he was responsible for the Concept Cars Pininfarina Citroën Osée (2001) for which he designed the interior and the Pininfarina Ford Start (2003), as well as for the Maserati GranTurismo (2003).

In 2004, he joined the PSA Peugeot Citroën Group as Chief Designer at the Citroën Design Studio in Vélizy near Paris. In 2007 he was appointed Director of Concept Cars and International Cooperation Programs, and one year later Head of Advanced Design.

He was part of the team led by Jean Pierre Ploué that resurrected Citroën Design and created the new DS Brand “ex nihilo”.

In 2021 he published the essay « CARS, DESIGN AND EMOTIONS – In praise of aesthetical pleasure » edited by Artioli Editore 1899, Modena, Italy.

During his tenure with the PSA Peugeot Citroën Group he was Head of Exterior and Interior Design for the production cars C3 Picasso (2008), C3 Aircross (2010), C4 Aircross (2012) and C1 (2014), as well as the Concept Cars DS Hypnos (2008), DS Revolte (2009), Citroen Tubik (2011), DS Numéro 9 (2012), C1 Swiss and Me (2014) and C1 Urban Ride (2014).

In 2008, he was appointed “Maître Expert Design” of the PSA Peugeot Citroën Group, representing the “Design expertise” of the Group in congresses and international committees from 2008 to 2012.

From 2015 to late 2016, he was director of the Automotive Division of Q-ID Industrial Design, Director of the Design Studio Q-Red in Maranello, Italy, and consultant for Ferrari Design, Maranello.

During his tenure as Pininfarina Senior Vice President Design, the Italian company has carried out a large number of projects: a range of show cars for the Hong Kong-based Hybrid Kinetic Brand (HK GT, HK 500 Sedan and HK350 SUV), the GT by Pininfarina for the Californian Brand Karma, presented at the 2019 Shanghai motor show, the Lux A 2.0 Sedan and the Lux SA 2.0 SUV, first 2 models for the Vietnamese OEM Vinfast. His Team has also designed, in collaboration with Automobili Pininfarina, the Battista electric Hypercar, presented at the 2019 Geneva motor show.

In 2021 he published the essay « CARS, DESIGN AND EMOTIONS – In praise of aesthetical pleasure » edited by Artioli Editore 1899, Modena, Italy.

Since 2025, he has been the founder and creative director of the multidisciplinary design studio BONZANIGO Design & Brand Development, based in Italian-speaking Switzerland, operating at the intersection of strategic consulting, project execution, and creative leadership.

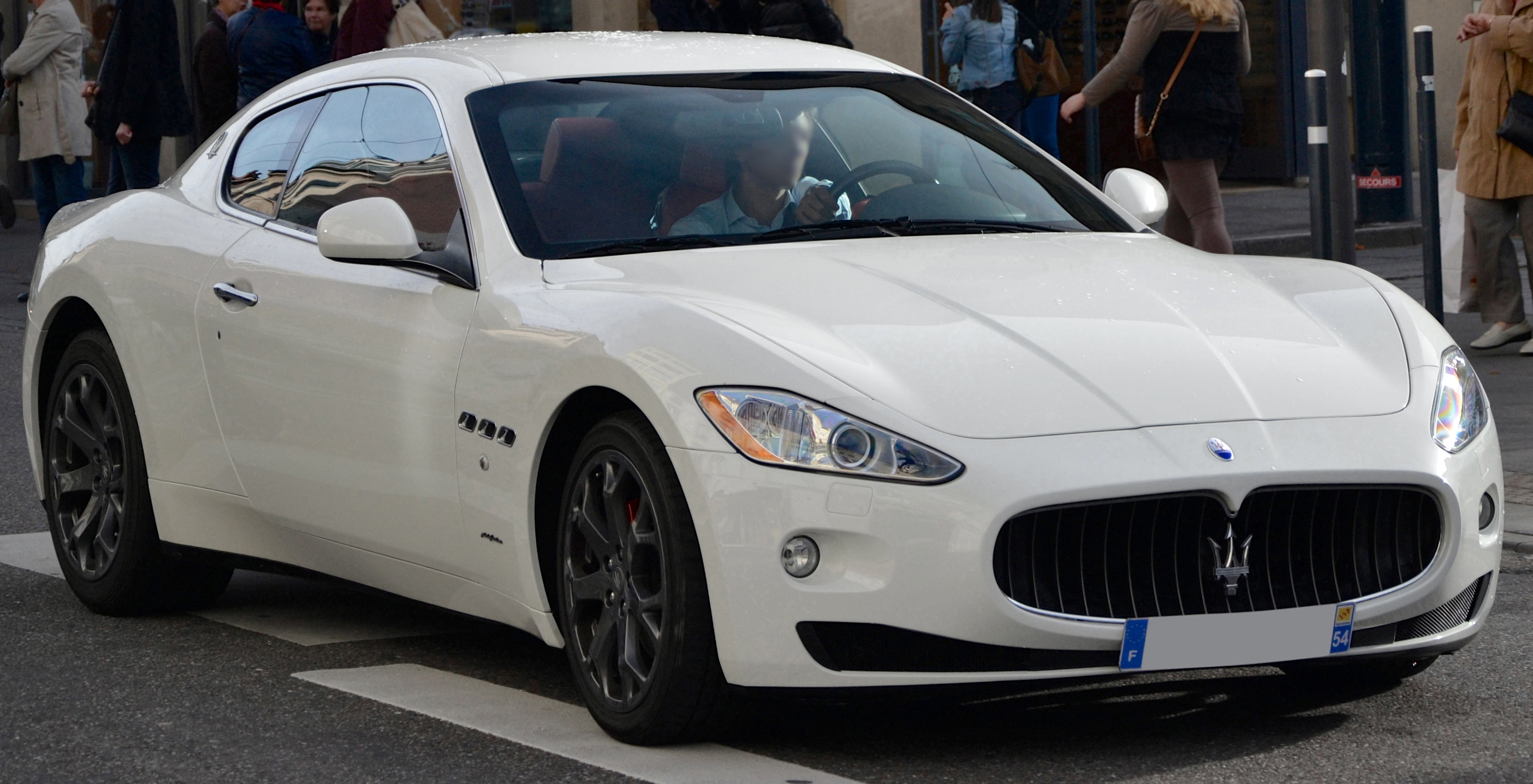
Maserati Granturismo

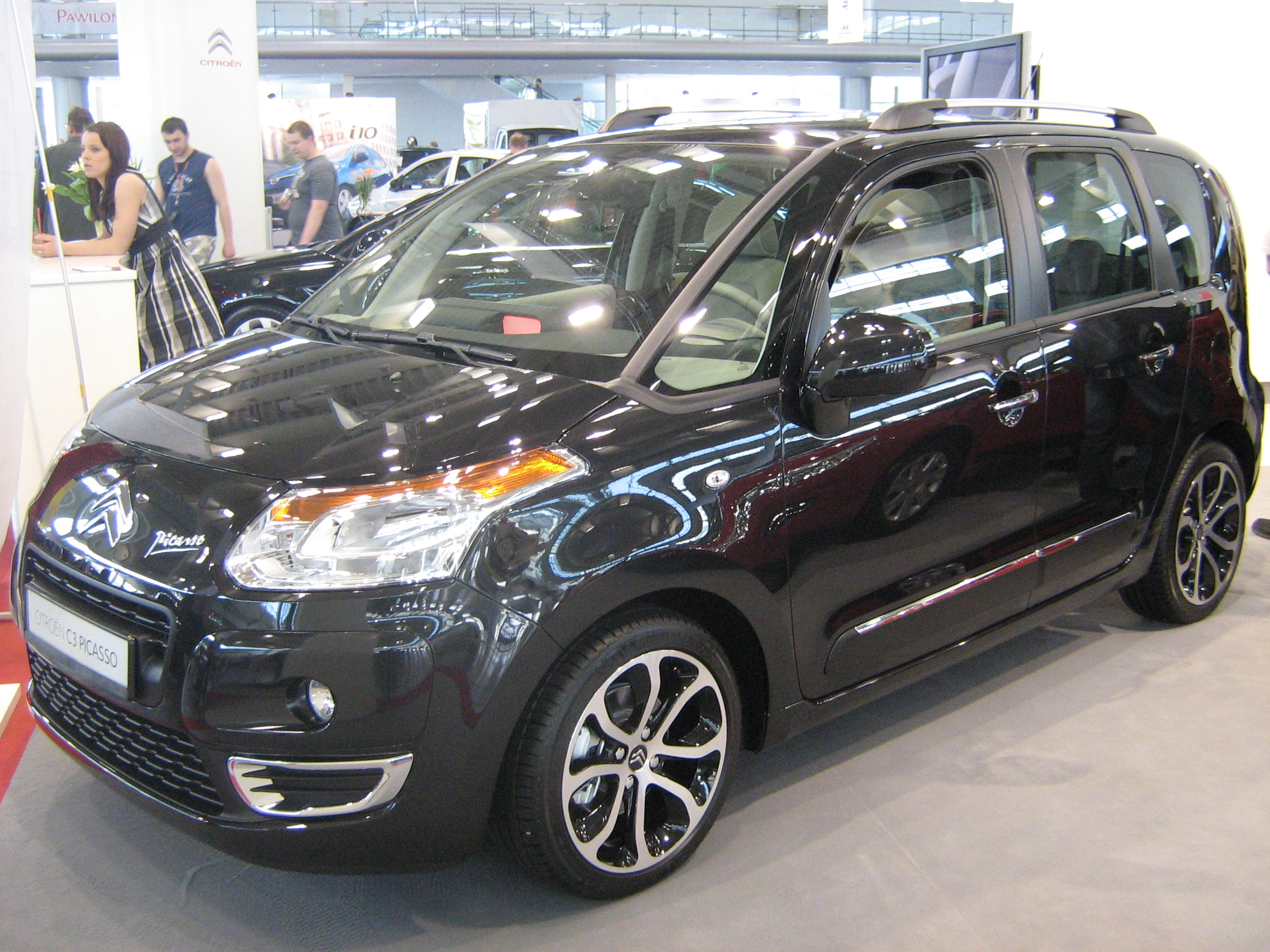
Citroën C3 Picasso

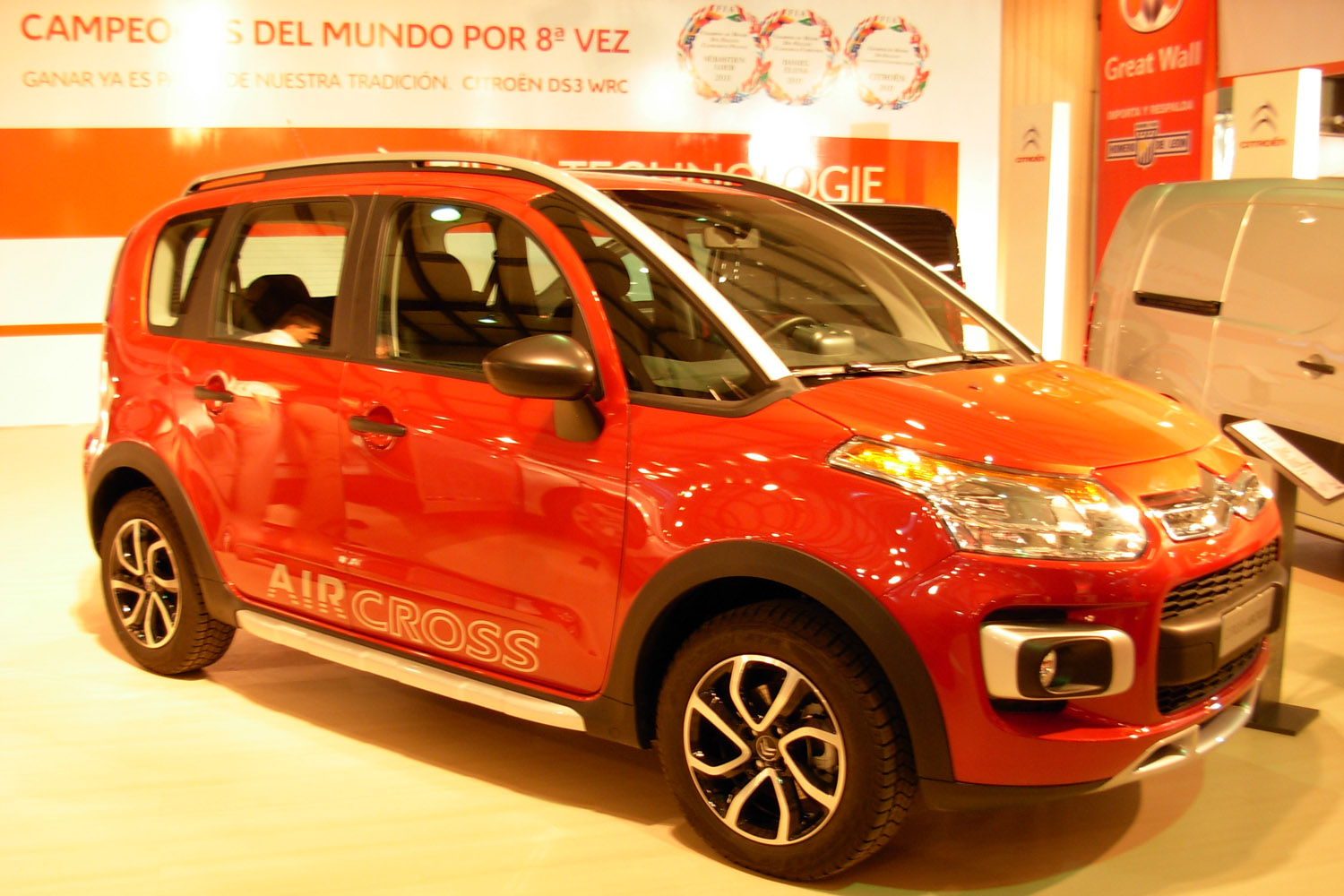
Citroën C3 Aircross

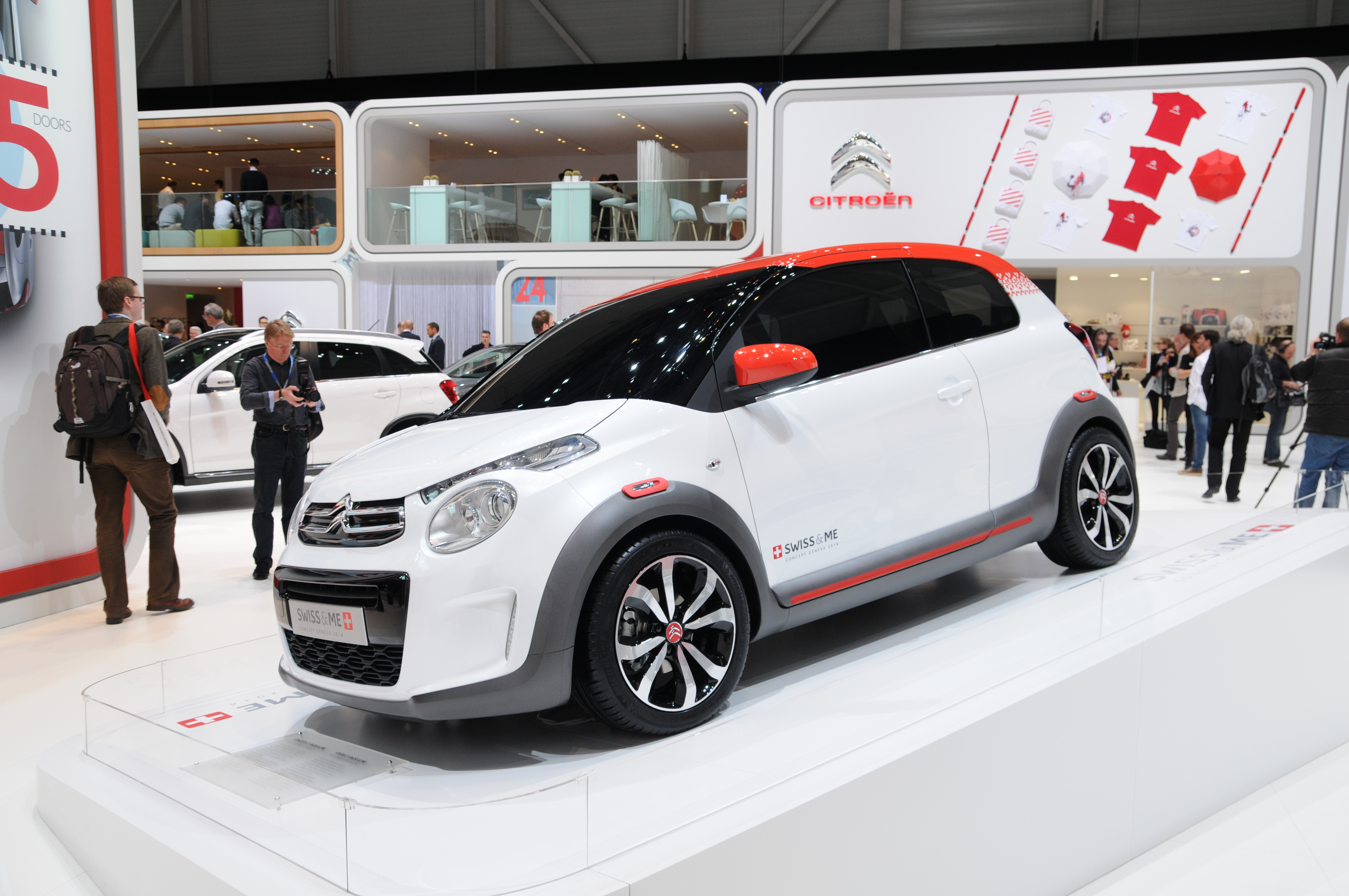
Citroën C1

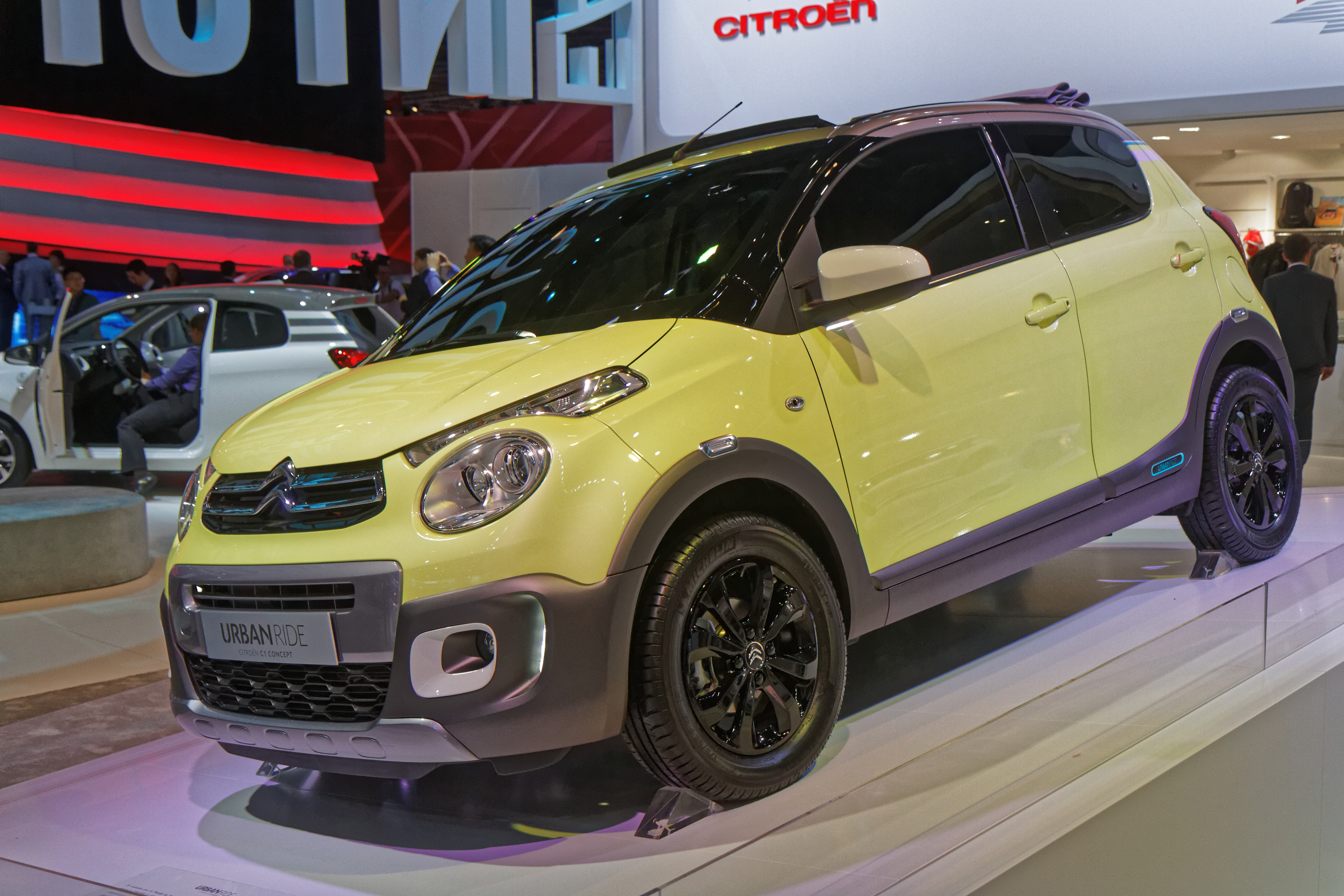
Citroën Urban Ride

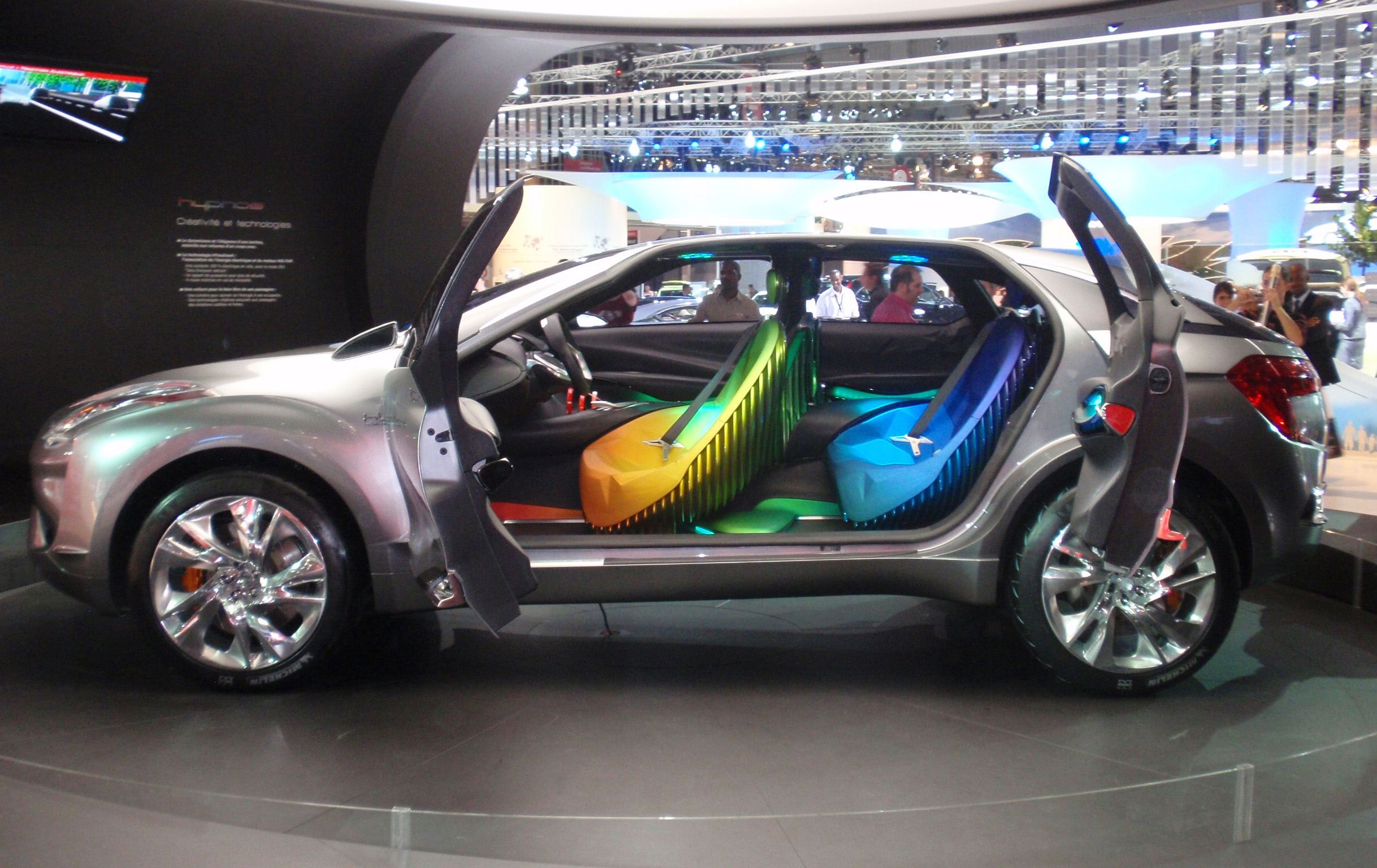
Citroën Hypnos

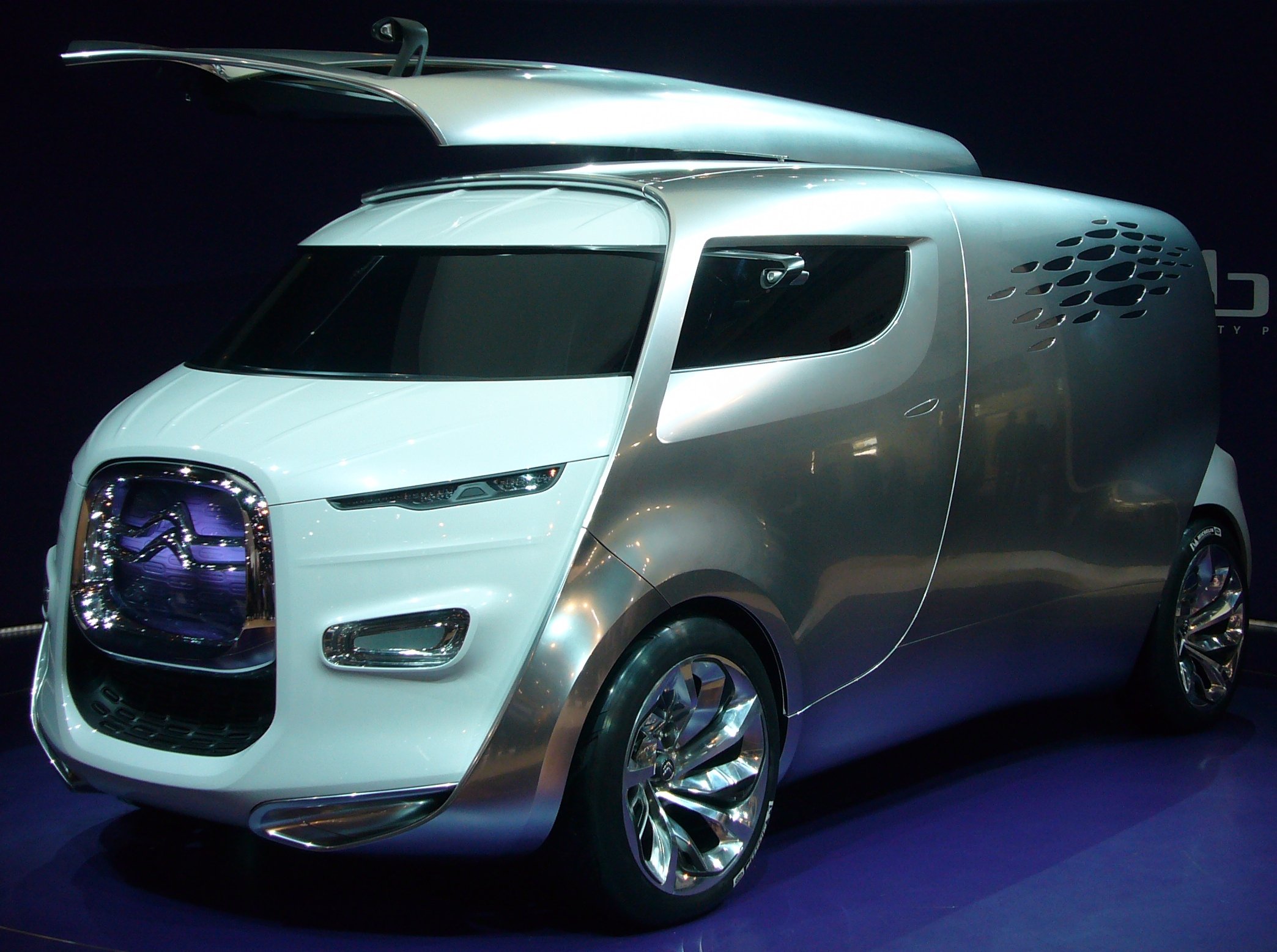
Citroën Tubik

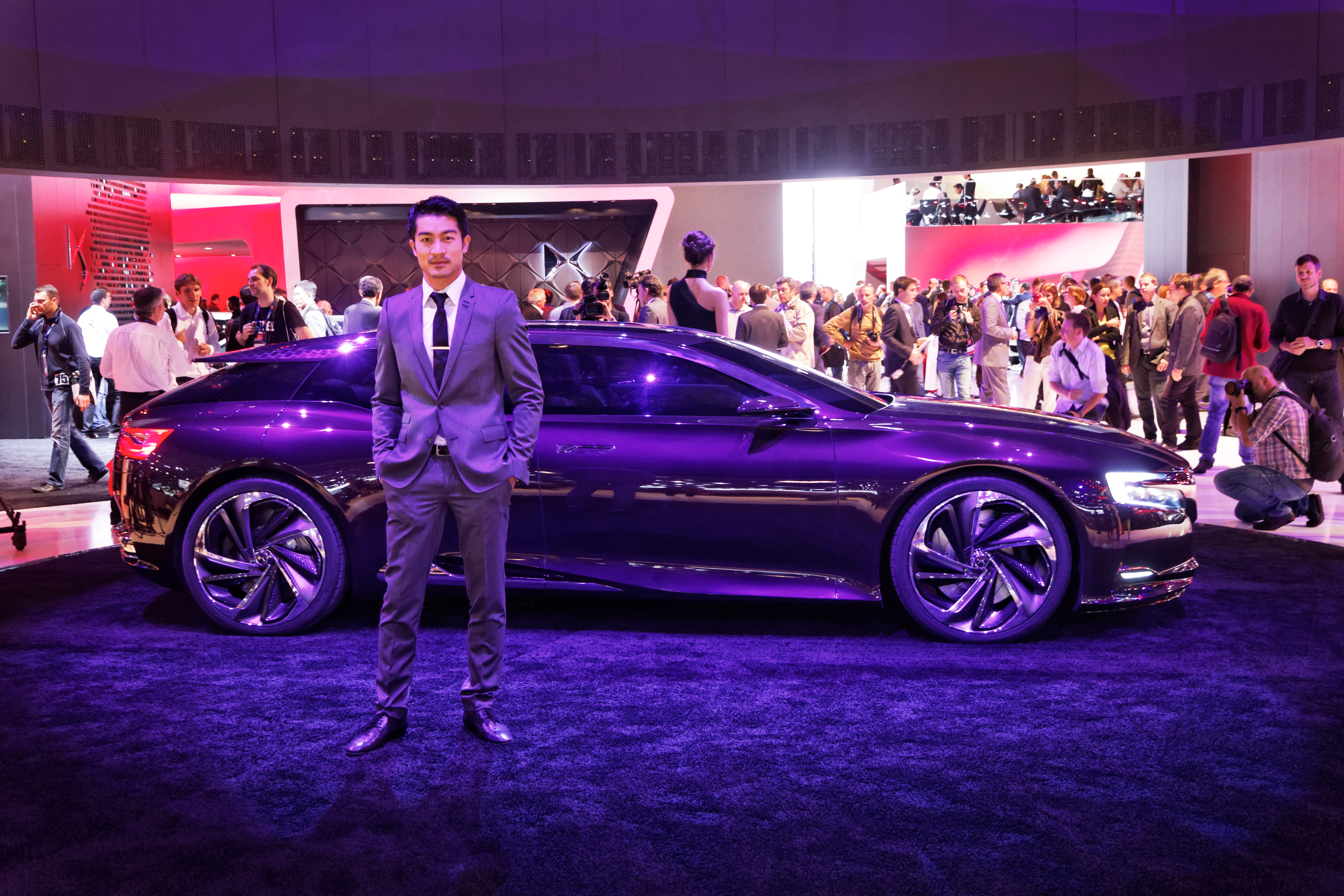
Citroën DS 9

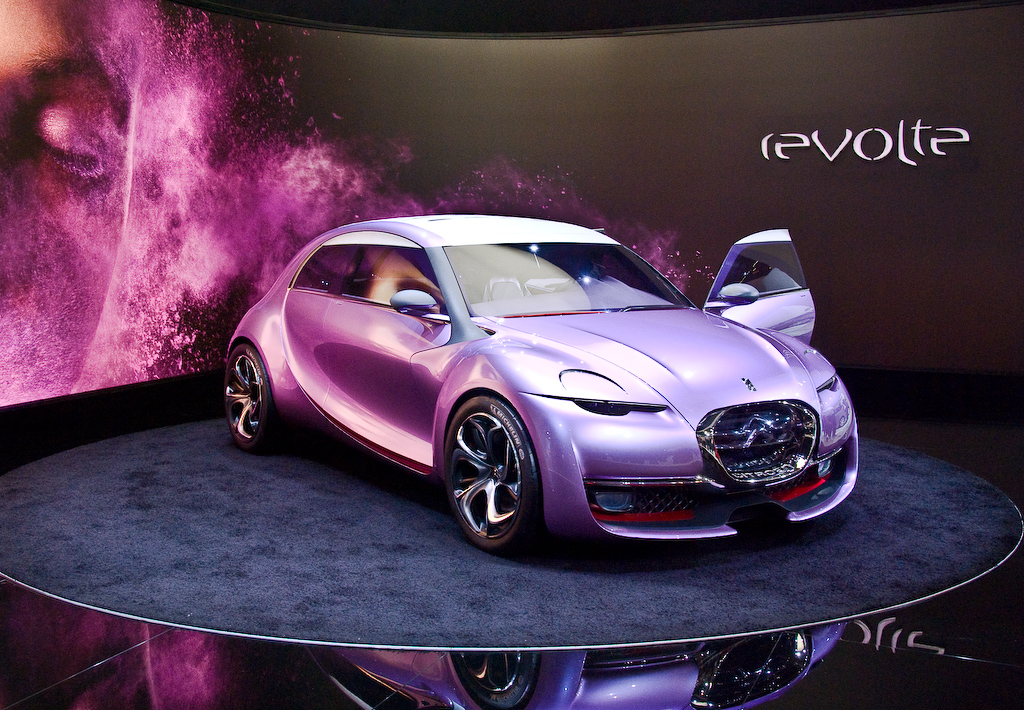
Citroën Revolte

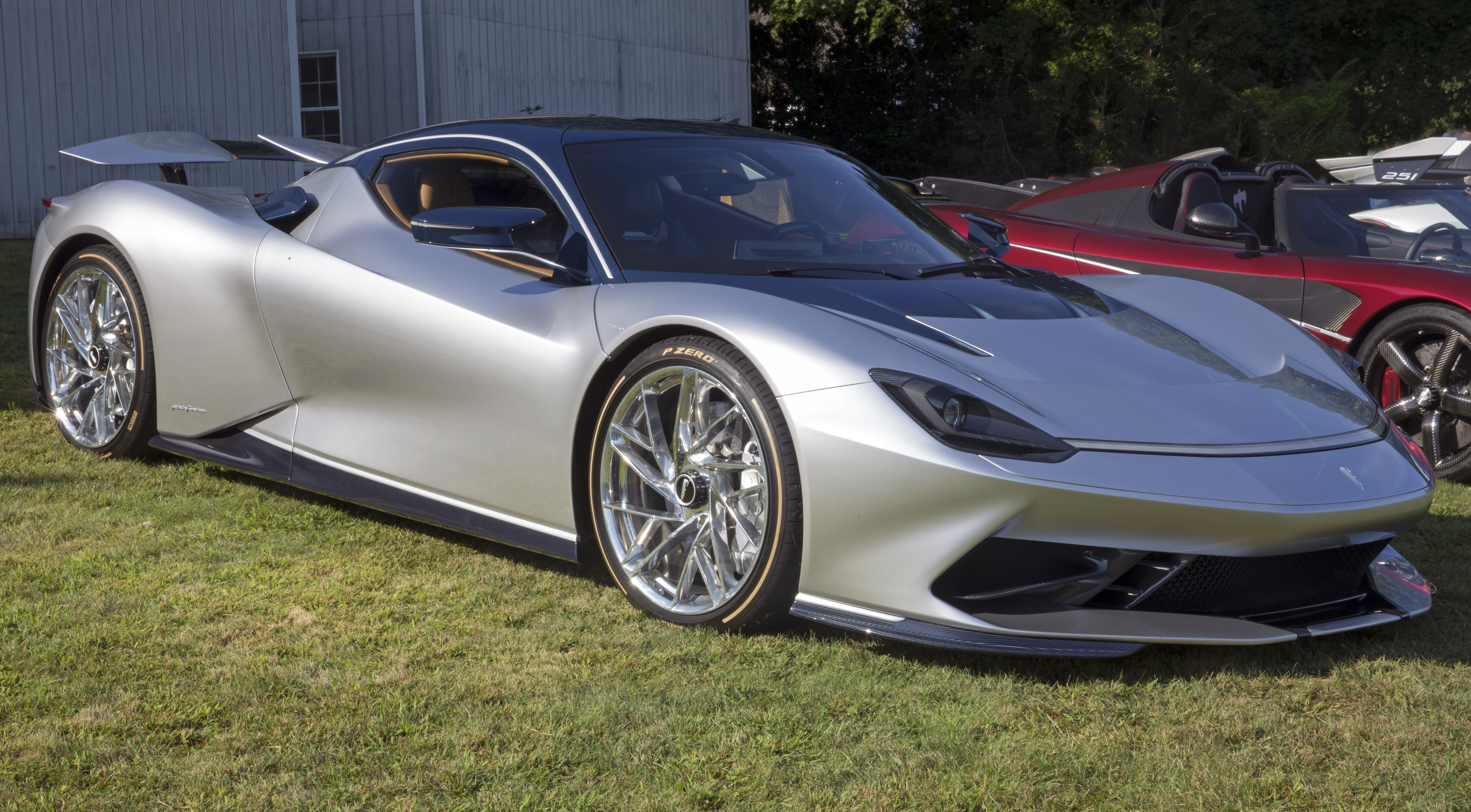
Pininfarina Battista

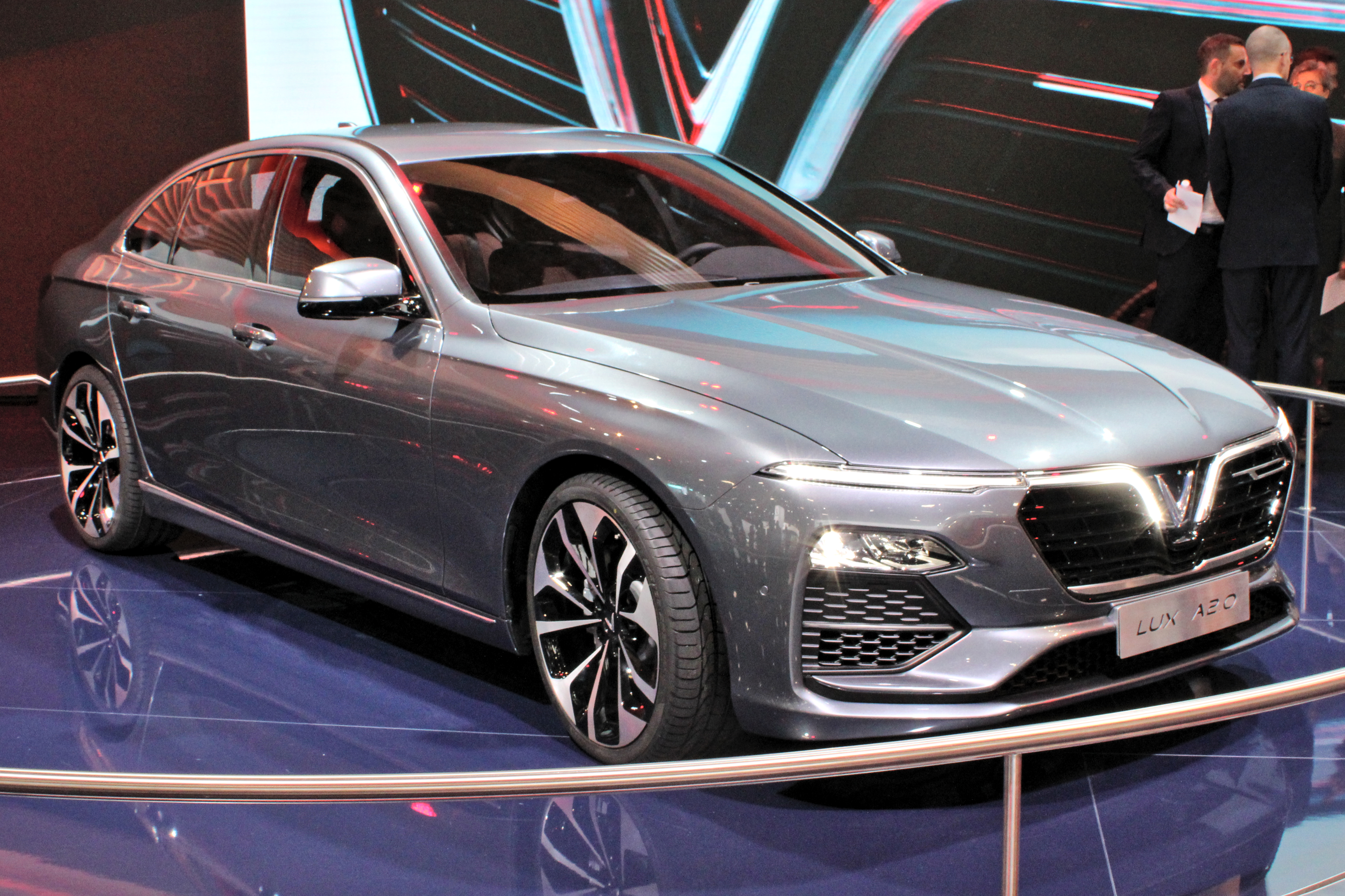
Vinfast Lux A 2.0

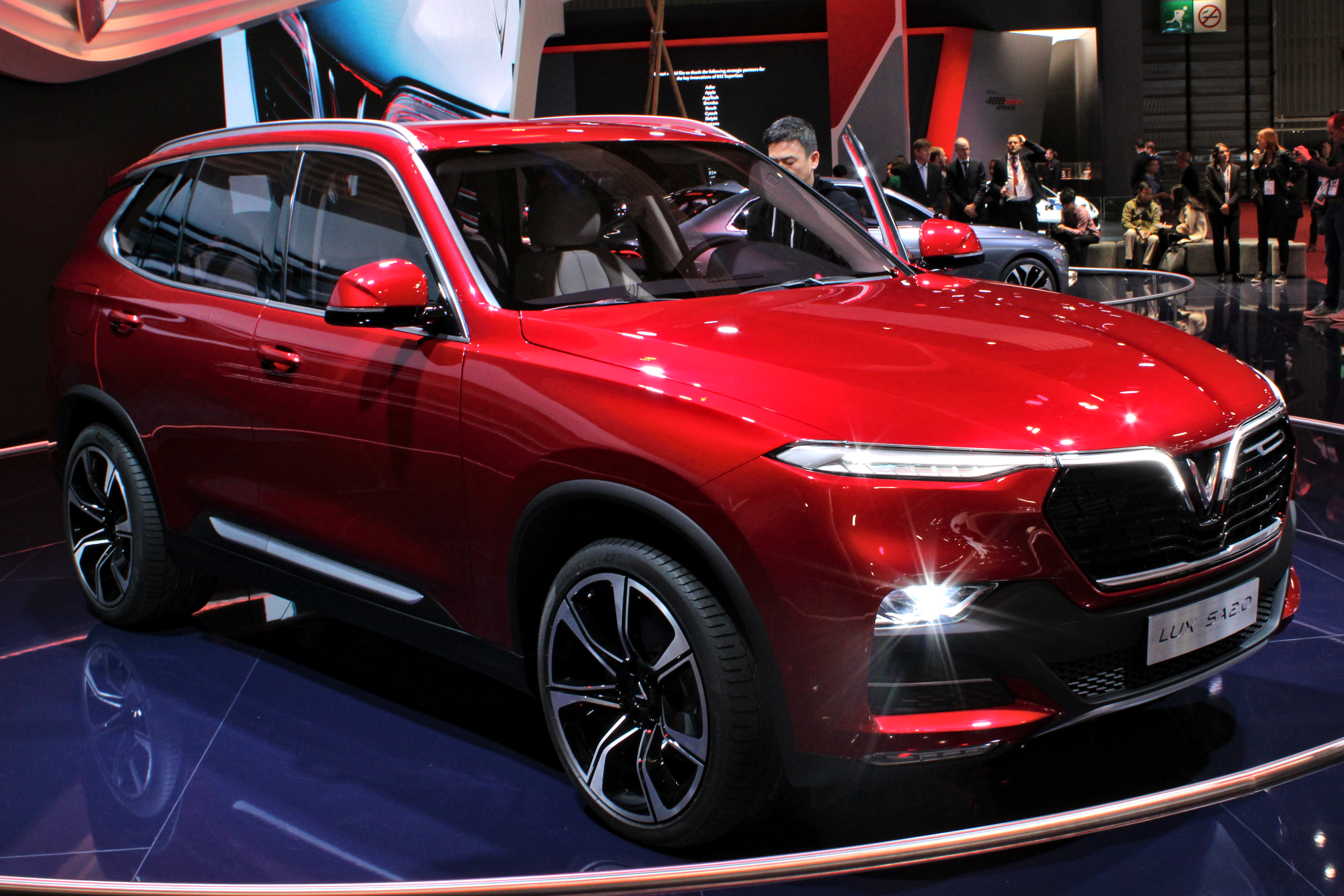
Vinfast Lux SA 2.0

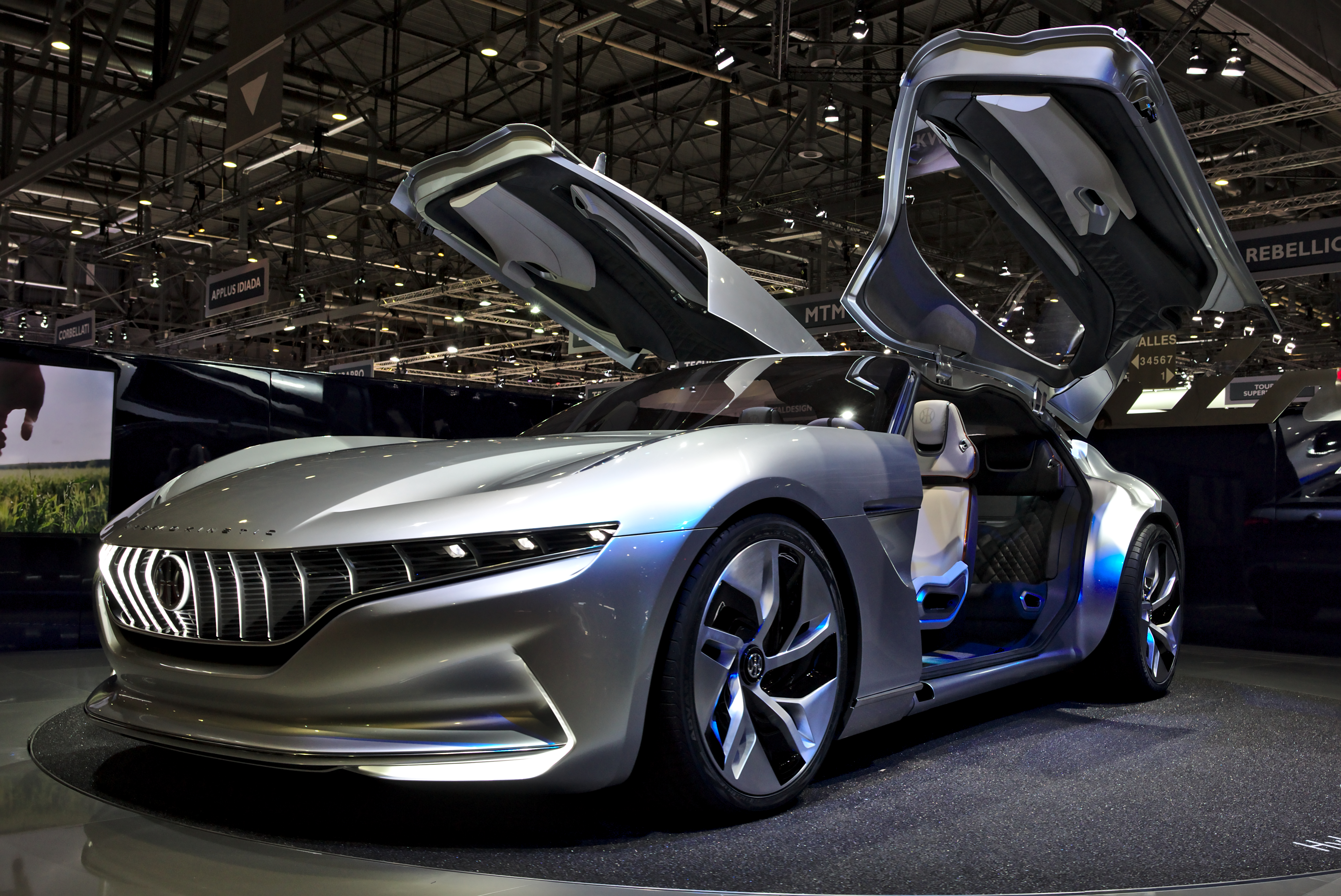
Pininfarina HK GT

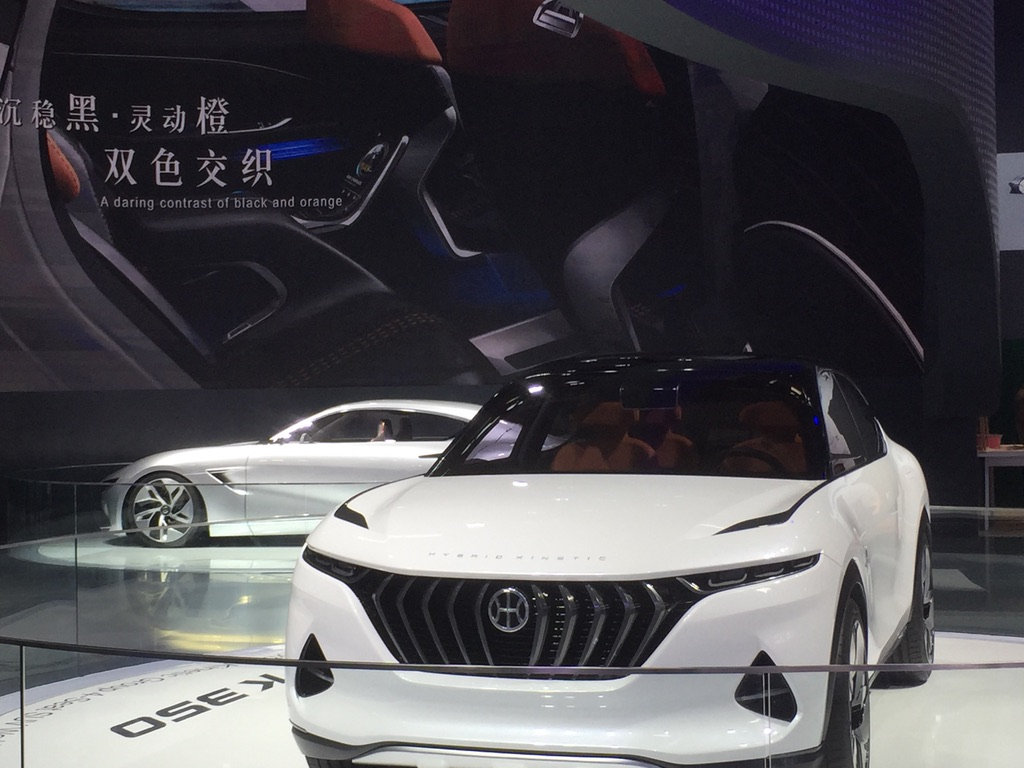
HK 350

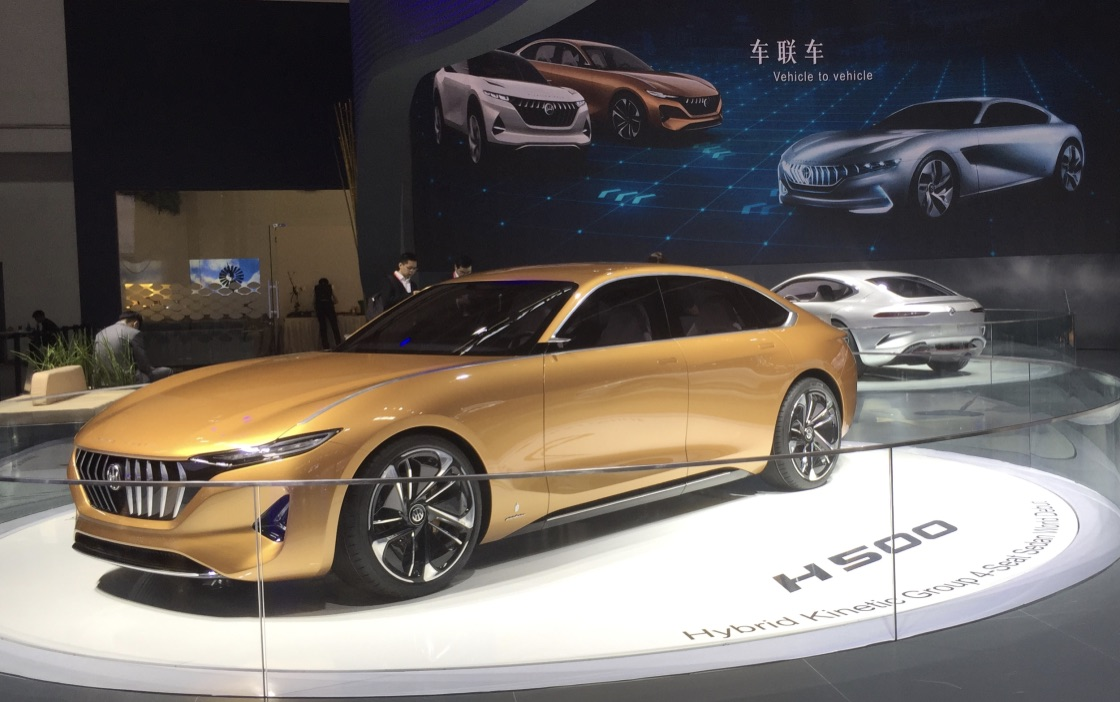
HK 500

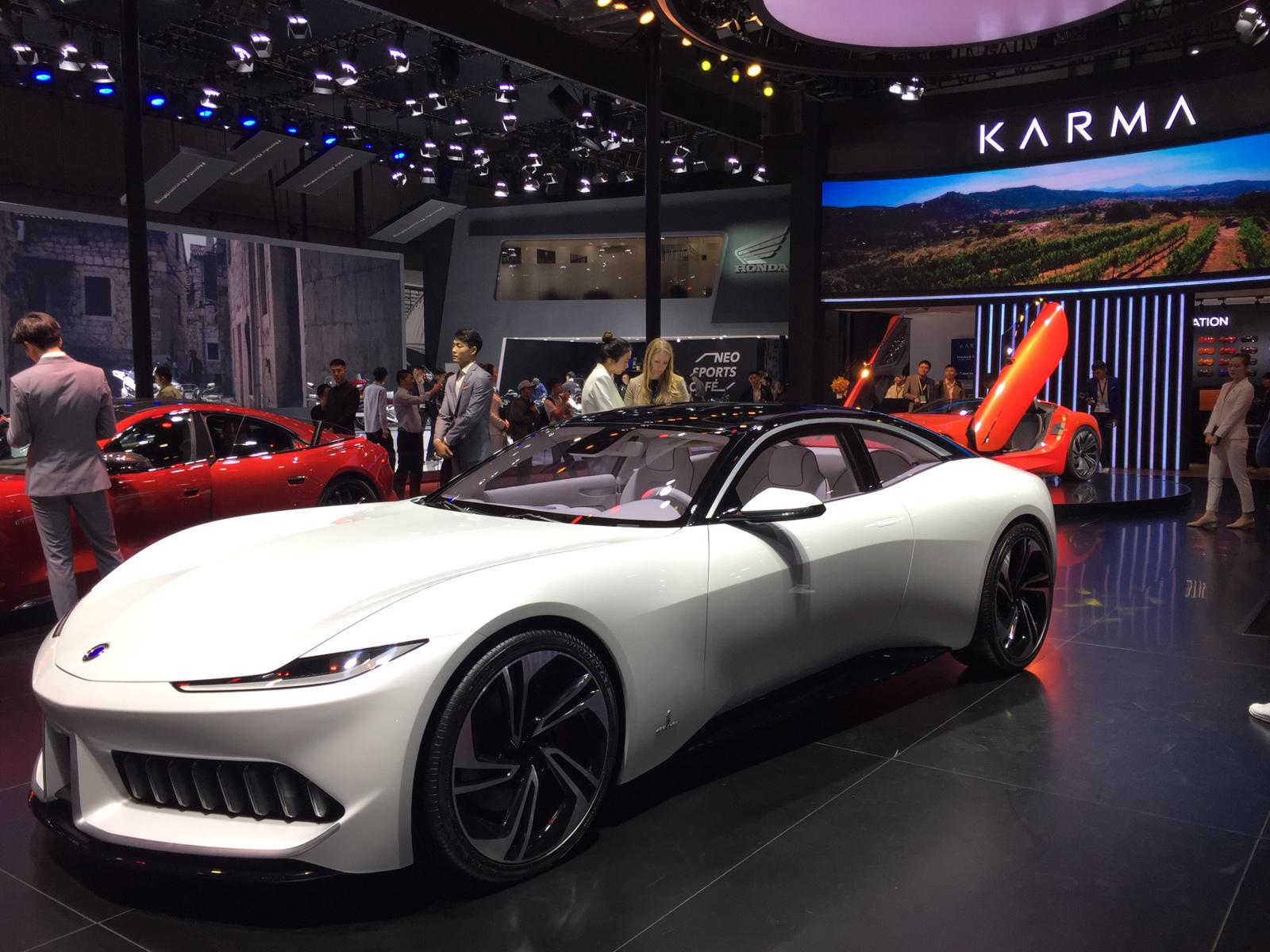
Karma GT by Pininfarina
