= Alfa Romeo Dardo =

Overview
- Manufacturer: Alfa Romeo
- Production: 1998
- Designer: Pininfarina under Lorenzo Ramaciotti

Body and chassis
- Class: Concept car
- Body style: Roadster
- Layout: Front-engine front-wheel drive
- Related: Alfa Romeo 156

Powertrain
- Engine: 2.5 L V6
- Transmission: manual

Dimensions
- Length: 4,380 mm (172.4 in)
- Width: 1,709 mm (67.3 in)
- Height: 1,250 mm (49.2 in)

The Alfa Romeo Dardo is a concept car designed by Pininfarina, whose source of inspiration was the Alfa Romeo 156, and a homage to years of Pininfarina/Alfa Romeo collaborations in the design of spiders (roadsters). The Dardo (Italian for dart) was introduced in 1998, and is equipped with a 2.5 litre V6, also from the 156. It also has a wheelbase which is slightly shorter than that of the 156. The styling for the Dardo's flanks uses a closing triangular shapes, as does the rear. The car includes the 156's dashboard with leather upholstery used for it and the seats. Pininfarina worked with Sparco to design and build the seats, which are supposed to have extremely rigid shell using carbon-Kevlar-carbon. It is also equipped with four-point seat belts. Its twin headlights were developed jointly with Valeo.
