= Ferrari 550 =

Grand tourer produced by Ferrari

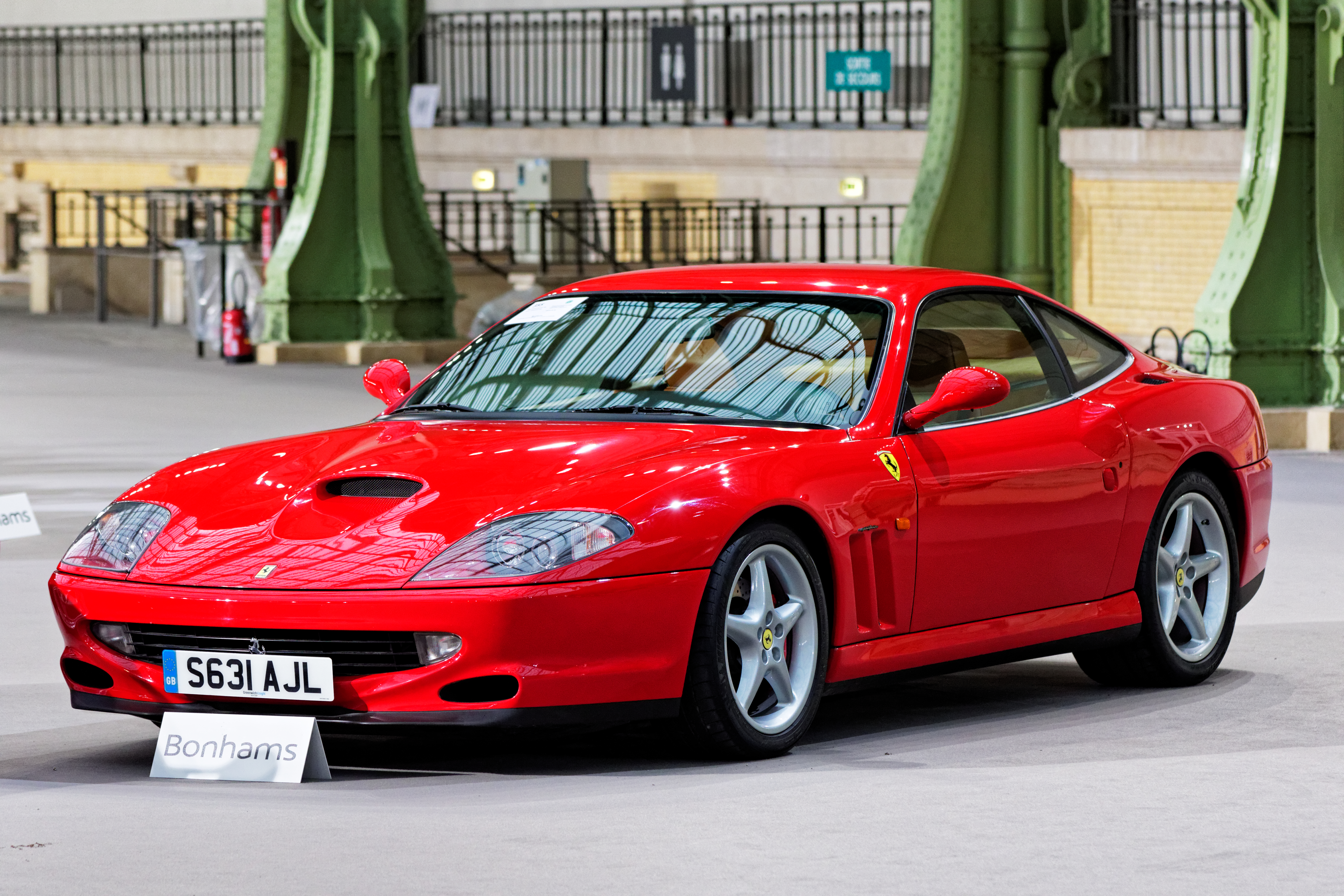

Overview
- Manufacturer: Ferrari
- Also called: Ferrari 550 Maranello
- Production: 1996–2002; 3,083 produced
- Assembly: Italy: Maranello
- Designer: Pininfarina: Lorenzo Ramaciotti; Elvio D'Aprile; Goran Popović (interior)

Body and chassis
- Class: Grand tourer (S)
- Body style: 2-door berlinetta (Maranello); 2-door roadster (Barchetta)
- Layout: Front-engine, rear-wheel-drive
- Related: Ferrari 456

Powertrain
- Engine: 5.5 L F133 A/C V12
- Power output: 485 PS (357 kW; 478 hp)
- Transmission: 6-speed manual

Dimensions
- Wheelbase: 2,500 mm (98.4 in)
- Length: 4,550 mm (179.1 in)
- Width: 1,935 mm (76.2 in)
- Height: 1,277 mm (50.3 in) (berlinetta); 1,258 mm (49.5 in) (barchetta)
- Kerb weight: 1,774 kg (3,912 lb)

Chronology
- Predecessor: Ferrari F512 M Ferrari 365 GTB/4 "Daytona" (Spiritually)
- Successor: Ferrari 575M Maranello

The Ferrari 550 Maranello (tipo F133) is a front-engine V12 2-seat grand tourer built by Ferrari from 1996 to 2002. The 550 Maranello marked Ferrari's return to a front-engine, rear-wheel drive layout for its 2-seater 12-cylinder model, 23 years after the 365 GTB/4 Daytona had been replaced by the mid-engined Berlinetta Boxer.

In 2000, Ferrari introduced the 550 Barchetta Pininfarina, a limited production roadster version of the 550 which was limited to just 448 examples. The 550 was replaced by the upgraded 575M Maranello in 2002.

== History ==
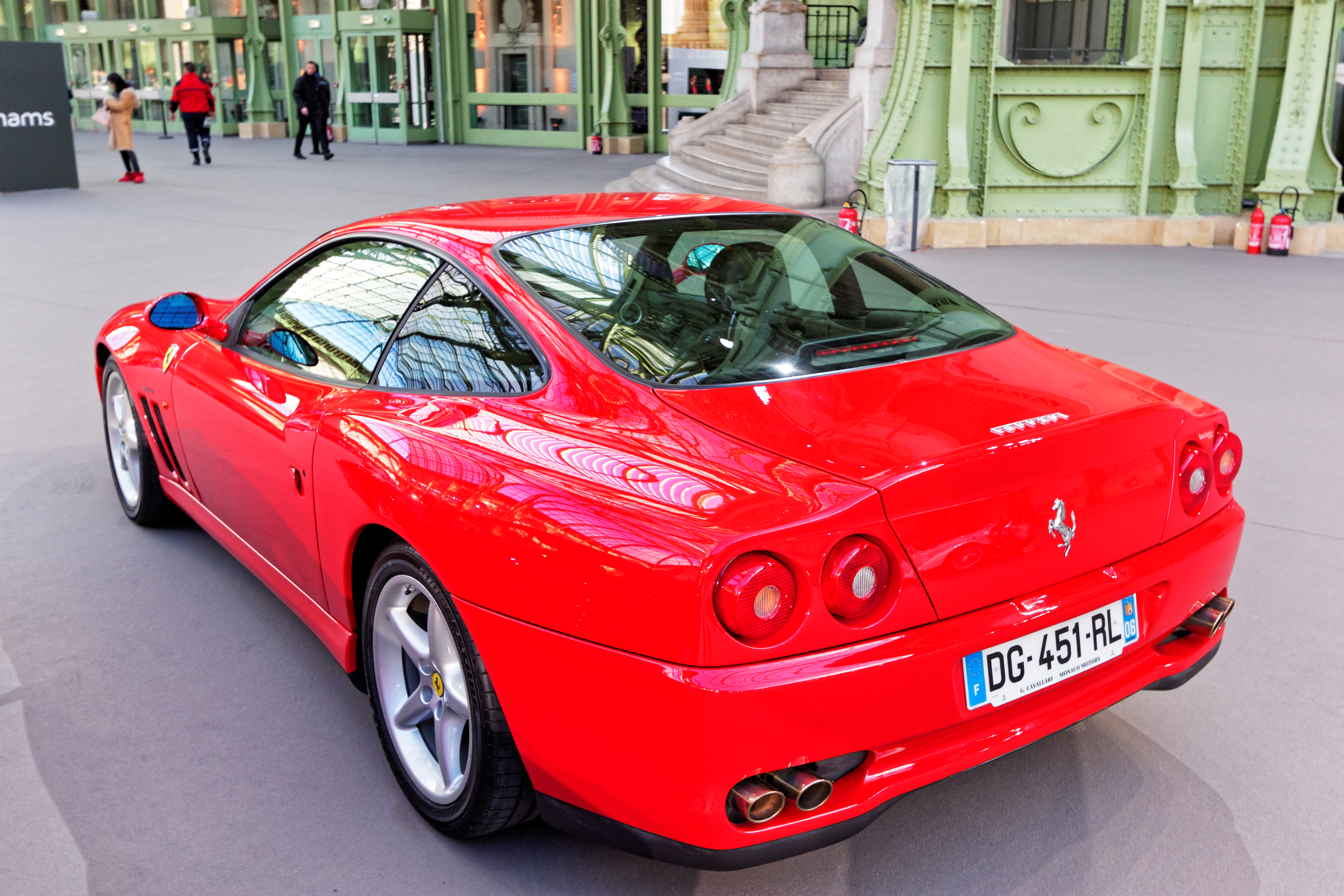
Ferrari 550 Maranello

Since 1973, when the traditional front-engined 365 GTB/4 Daytona had been replaced by the mid-engined Berlinetta Boxer, Ferrari's top-of-the-line 12-cylinder 2-seater model had used a mid-mounted 180° 12-cylinder flat engine. The Berlinetta Boxer had later been developed into the Testarossa, the final evolution of which was the 1994 F512 M. Under the presidency of Luca Cordero di Montezemolo, who took office in 1991, the F512 M replacement was developed as a traditional front-engined V12 grand tourer.

After 30 months of development, the Ferrari 550 Maranello was unveiled in July 1996 at the Nürburgring racing circuit in Germany. The model's name referred to the 5.5-litres total engine displacement in centilitres and to the town of Maranello, home to the Ferrari headquarters and factory. Pininfarina executed both the exterior and interior design. The exterior design is credited to Elvio D'Aprile under the supervision of Lorenzo Ramaciotti, and created between 1993 and 1996. Maurizio Corbi, a Pininfarina sketch artist and designer, was also involved in the design process. The interior design was penned by Goran Popović. Frame and main engine components were shared with the 2+2 Ferrari 456, although at 2,500 mm (98.4 in), the 550's wheelbase was 100 mm (3.9 in) shorter.

In 2002 the 550 was replaced by the 575M Maranello, which was an all-around improved version (modificata in Ferrari parlance) of the car, rather than an all-new construction. The 575M was fitted with a larger 5.75-litre version of the F133 engine. In total 3,083 units of the 550 Maranello were produced between 1996 and 2001.

== Specifications ==
=== Body and chassis ===
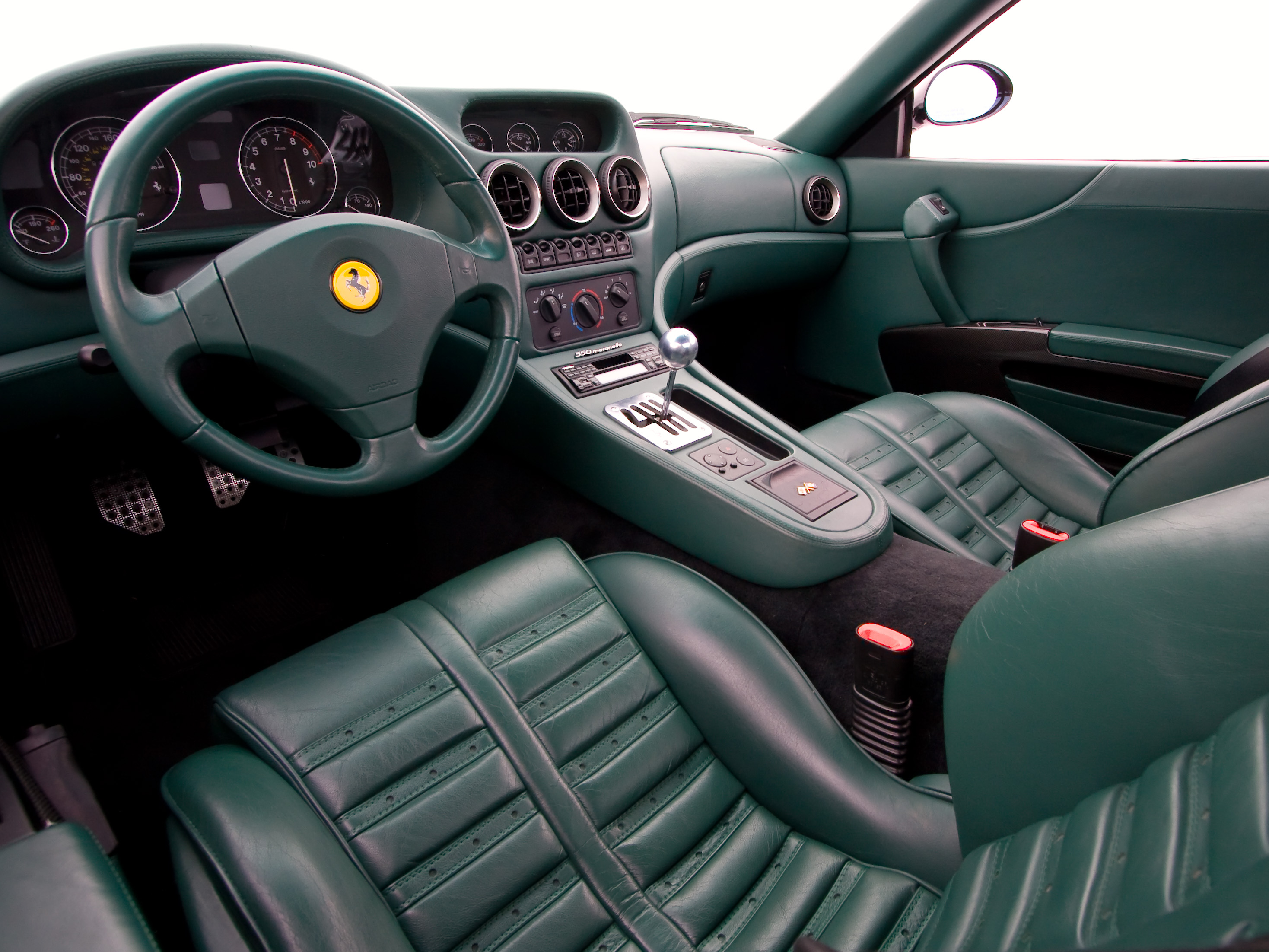
Interior

The 550 used a front-engine, rear-wheel drive transaxle layout, with the engine mounted almost behind the front axle, and the 6-speed gearbox located at the rear axle together with the limited-slip differential. The chassis is a tubular steel space frame, to which the aluminium body panels were soldered. The Pininfarina-designed body had a drag coefficient of 0.33. Suspension was of the double wishbone type with coaxial coil spring and damper units on all four corners, and anti-roll bars front and rear. The steering was rack and pinion with variable power assist. The vented disc brakes were 330 mm (13.0 in) at the front and 310 mm (12.2 in) at the rear. Magnesium alloy was used for the 18-inch wheels. Electronic driver aid systems included anti-slip regulation, which could be adjusted on two levels or switched off completely, and four-way anti-lock braking system.

Gear	1	2	3	4	5	6	Final drive
Ratio	3.15:1	2.18:1	1.57:1	1.19:1	0.94:1	0.76:1	3.91:1

=== Engine ===
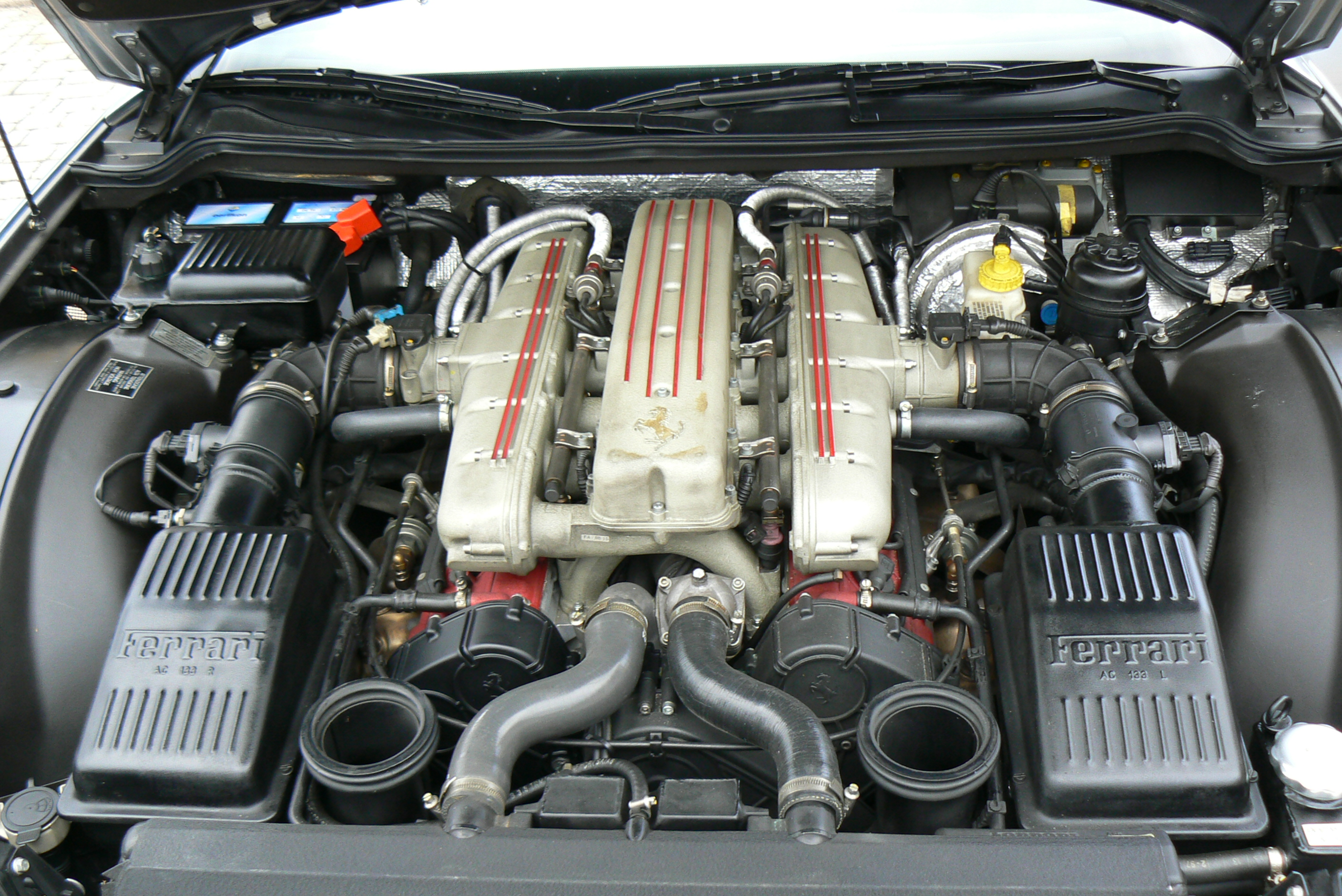
The Tipo F133A V12 engine

The F133 A engine is a naturally aspirated 65° V12 with four valves per cylinder, dual overhead cams and a variable length intake manifold. It displaces 5,474 cc (334.0 cu in) and produces 485 PS (357 kW; 478 hp) at 7,000 rpm and 568.1 N⋅m (419 lb⋅ft) at 5,000 rpm. Bore and stroke measure 88 mm and 75 mm. The Barchetta's engine is very similar and has the same output but carries the F133 C engine code.

=== Performance ===
According to Ferrari, the 550 Maranello has a top speed of 320 km/h (199 mph), and can accelerate from a standstill to 100 km/h (62 mph) in 4.4 seconds. Testing the 550 Maranello in 2000, American car magazine Motor Trend recorded a 0 to 60 mph (0 to 97 km/h) acceleration time of 4.2 seconds, a 0 to 100 mph (0 to 161 km/h) time of 9.6 seconds, and a ¼ mile (0.4 km) time of 12.5 seconds at 116.9 mph.

=== 550 Maranello World Speed Record (WSR) ===
In October 1998, Ferrari sent a lightly modified 550 to a 12 kilometers oval test track to the Transportation Research Center in East Liberty, Ohio and set three new world records as follows:

- A distance of 100 miles covered at an average speed of 190.2 mph (306 km/h).
- A distance of 100 kilometers at an average speed of 188.9 mph (304 km/h).
- Driving for one hour at an average speed of 184 mph (296 km/h).

To celebrate these records, Ferrari built 33 road cars to the exact specification of the record-setting car. Aside from the actual record setting car, all the WSR cars were finished to European specifications. These differ from the standard 550M by having been fitted with the Fiorano handling pack, a leather-trimmed roll cage, Alcantara-covered steering wheel, and carbon bucket seats with race harnesses and "Daytona" stitching. A WSR plaque was installed on the center console and carbon fiber detailing was applied to the gear knob and footrests. Besides the plaque, all the other extras could be ordered on a regular 550 as well, including the handling package and the integrated roll cage.

A preproduction Lamborghini Murciélago broke these records in 2002 at the Nardò Ring in Italy.

== 550 Barchetta Pininfarina ==
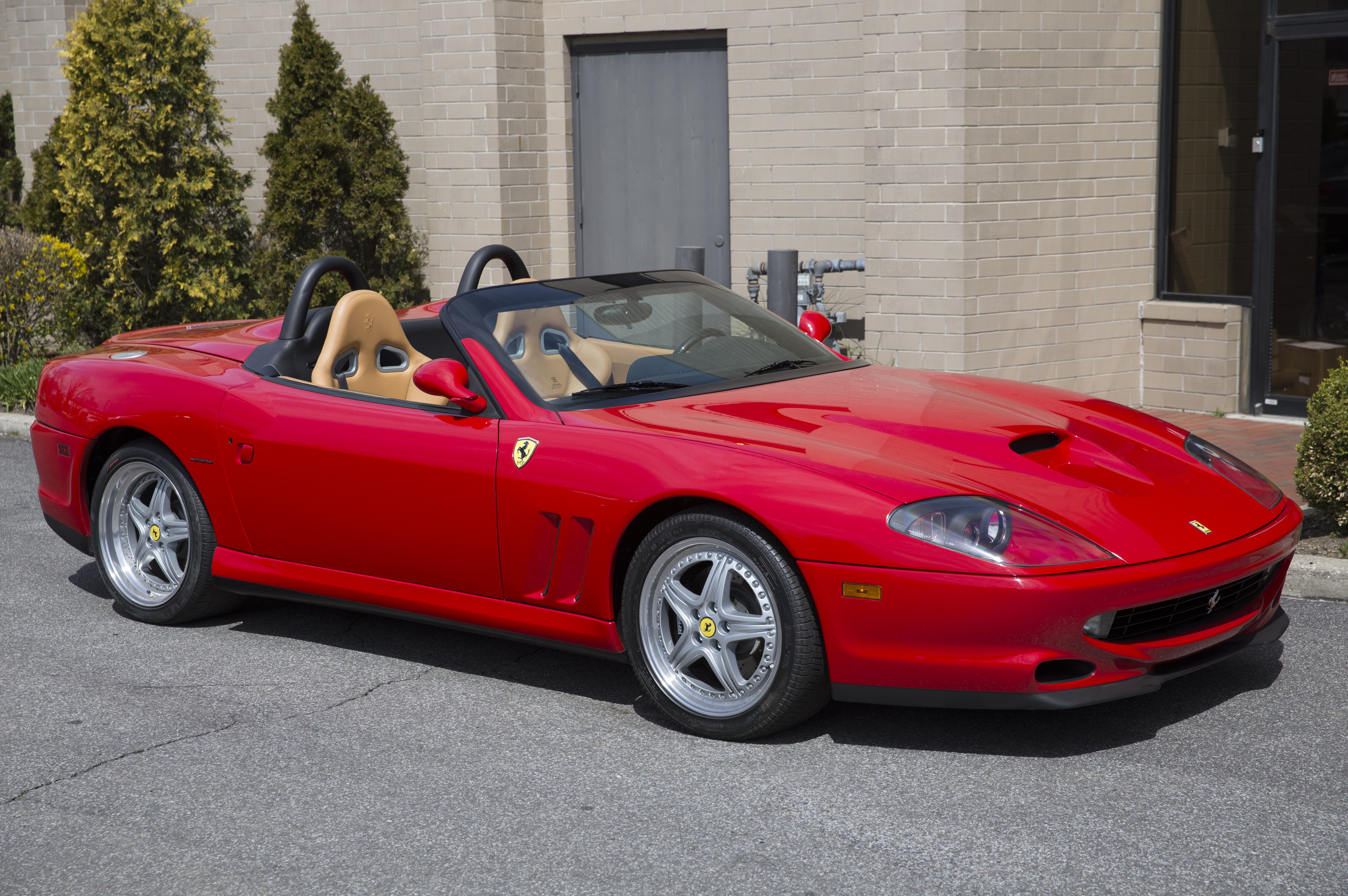
2001 Ferrari 550 Barchetta Pininfarina

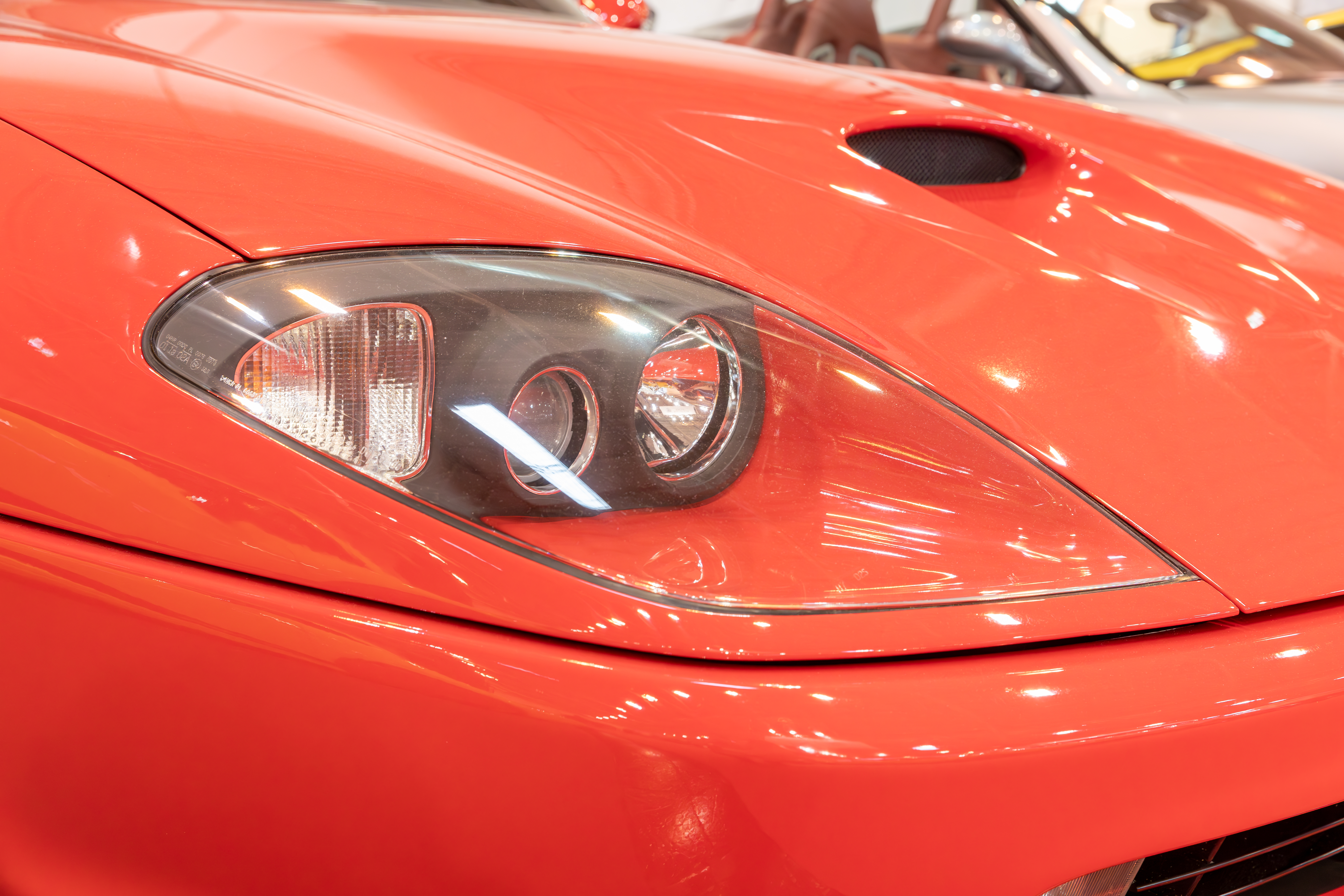
Headlamp

Ferrari introduced a roadster version of the 550 at the Paris Motor Show in 2000 to commemorate the 70th anniversary of Pininfarina. The Ferrari 550 Barchetta Pininfarina was a true barchetta with no real convertible top provided. The factory did provide a cloth soft top, but it was intended only for temporary use to protect the interior from rain as using the top above 70 mph (113 km/h) was not deemed safe. Aesthetically, the barchetta featured a more deeply raked windshield than the coupé for improved aerodynamics, roll-over hoops behind the seats, and a longer rear section than the coupé to complete the smooth overall design resulting in more cargo space than the coupé, even when it was less practical. Other changes included new 19-inch alloy wheels specially made for the barchetta.

A total of 448 cars were produced, four more than initially planned 444 cars due to concerns of superstition in the Japanese market about the number 4. The 448 cars were preceded by 12 prototypes numbered P01–P12 on their interior plaques. To an observer the prototypes and production cars are indistinguishable. The mechanical underpinnings of the car remained the same as its coupé counterpart but the engine was given the F133C code mainly for differentiation. Performance figures differed as compared to the 550 Maranello due to the loss of a roof, with 0–62 mph (0–100 km/h) acceleration time same as the coupe at 4.4 seconds but top speed reduced to 186 mph (300 km/h). All the 448 cars had a numbered plaque (i.e. x of 448) on the dashboard with Sergio Pininfarina's signature.

== Concept cars and one-off specials ==
=== Rossa ===
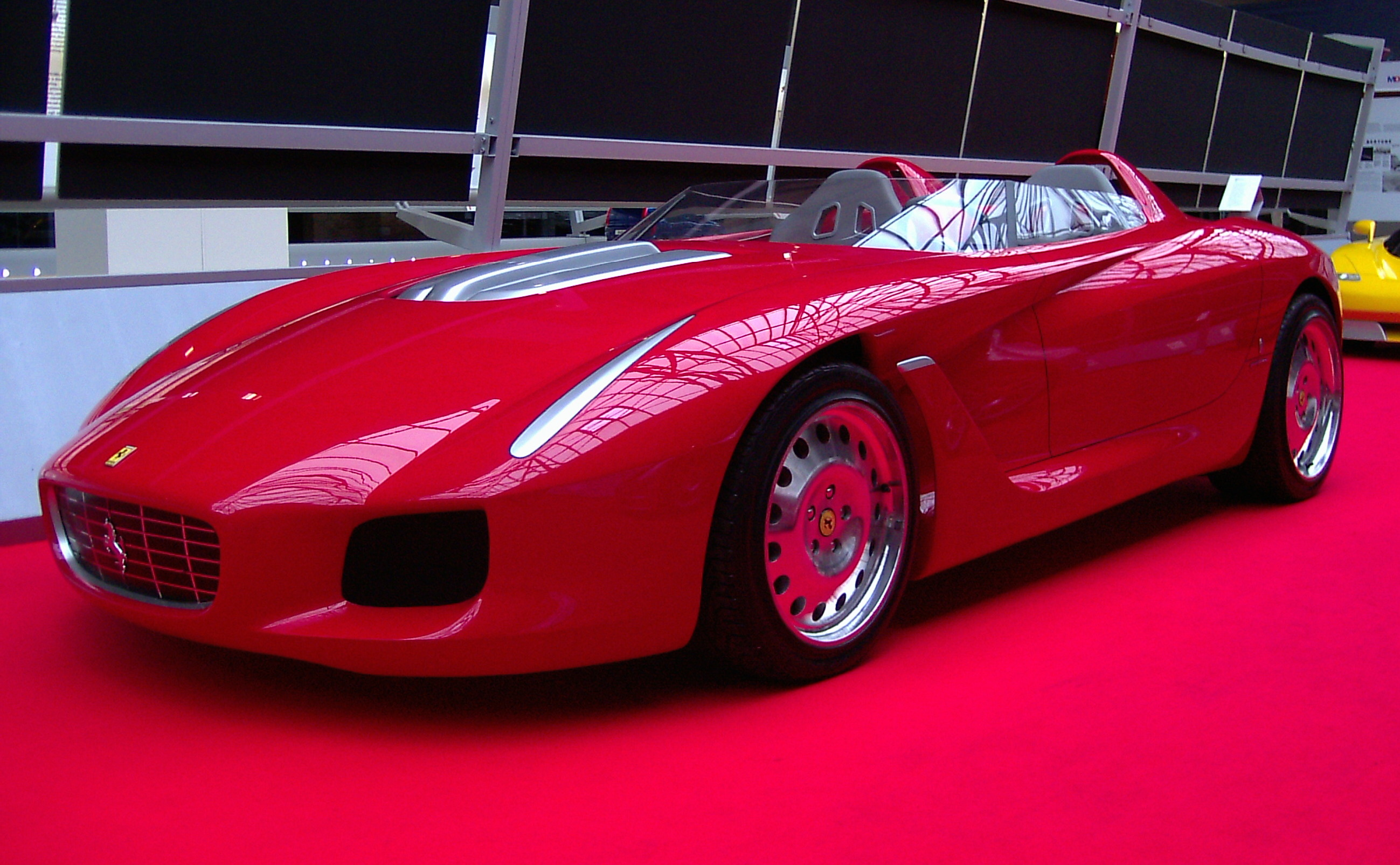
Pininfarina Ferrari Rossa

The 550-based Ferrari Rossa is a concept car introduced at the 2000 Turin Motor Show to celebrate the 70th anniversary of Pininfarina. The 2-door speedster shares the mechanical components from the 550 Maranello. The design of the Rossa, done by Ken Okuyama at Pininfarina, was inspired by the 1958 Ferrari 250 Testa Rossa, and some of the styling elements later found their way to future Ferrari production cars such as the Enzo and the F430.

=== 550 GTZ Barchetta ===
On October 28, 2009, Zagato and Ferrari revealed that they had been working on a roadster version of the 575 GTZ coupé to celebrate the 90th anniversary of the long collaboration between the two Italian establishments. The resulting product called the 550 GTZ Barchetta was limited to only three units and based on the 550 Barchetta Pininfarina, including one RHD example. Unlike the original version, Zagato developed an electronically-operated roof. The design of the GTZ Barchetta was inspired by the 1956 Ferrari 250 GT Berlinetta.

All examples were sold at a price of £1 million (€1.1 million/ US$1.6 million) each. In December 2019, the RHD car sold at a Bonhams auction for £ 575,000 including premium with 2,700 miles.

VIN number	Assembly number	Driver side	Exterior color	Interior color
ZFFZR52C00124138	41717	RHD	Dark grey metallic	Cream
?	?	LHD	Silver (Argento Nurburgring)	Red and black
?	?	LHD	Silver (Grigio Titanio)	Red and black

550 GTZ Barchetta

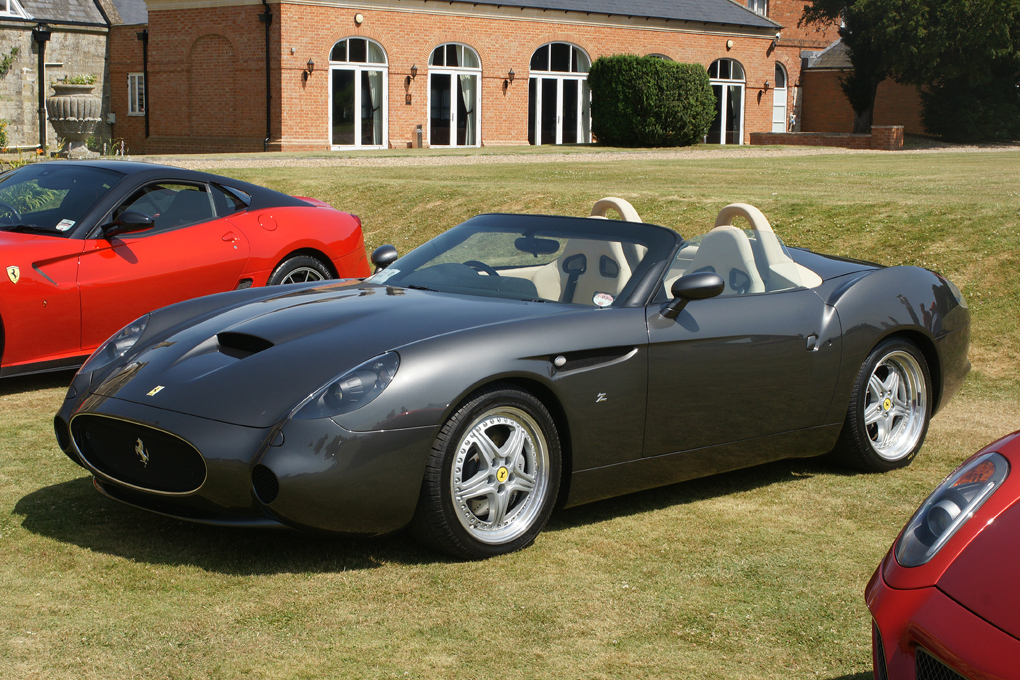
Chassis no. 124138 left side

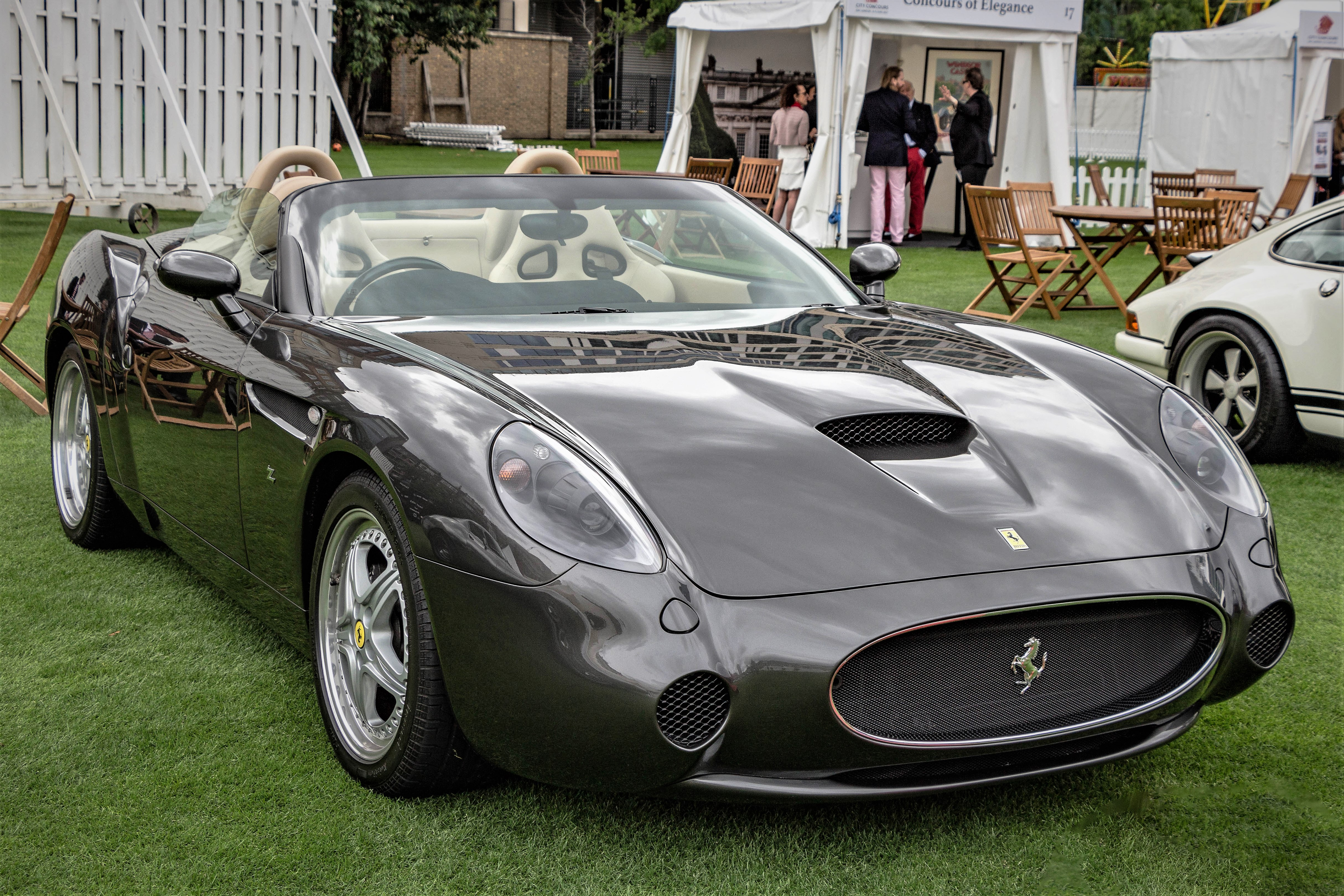
Chassis no. 124138 front view

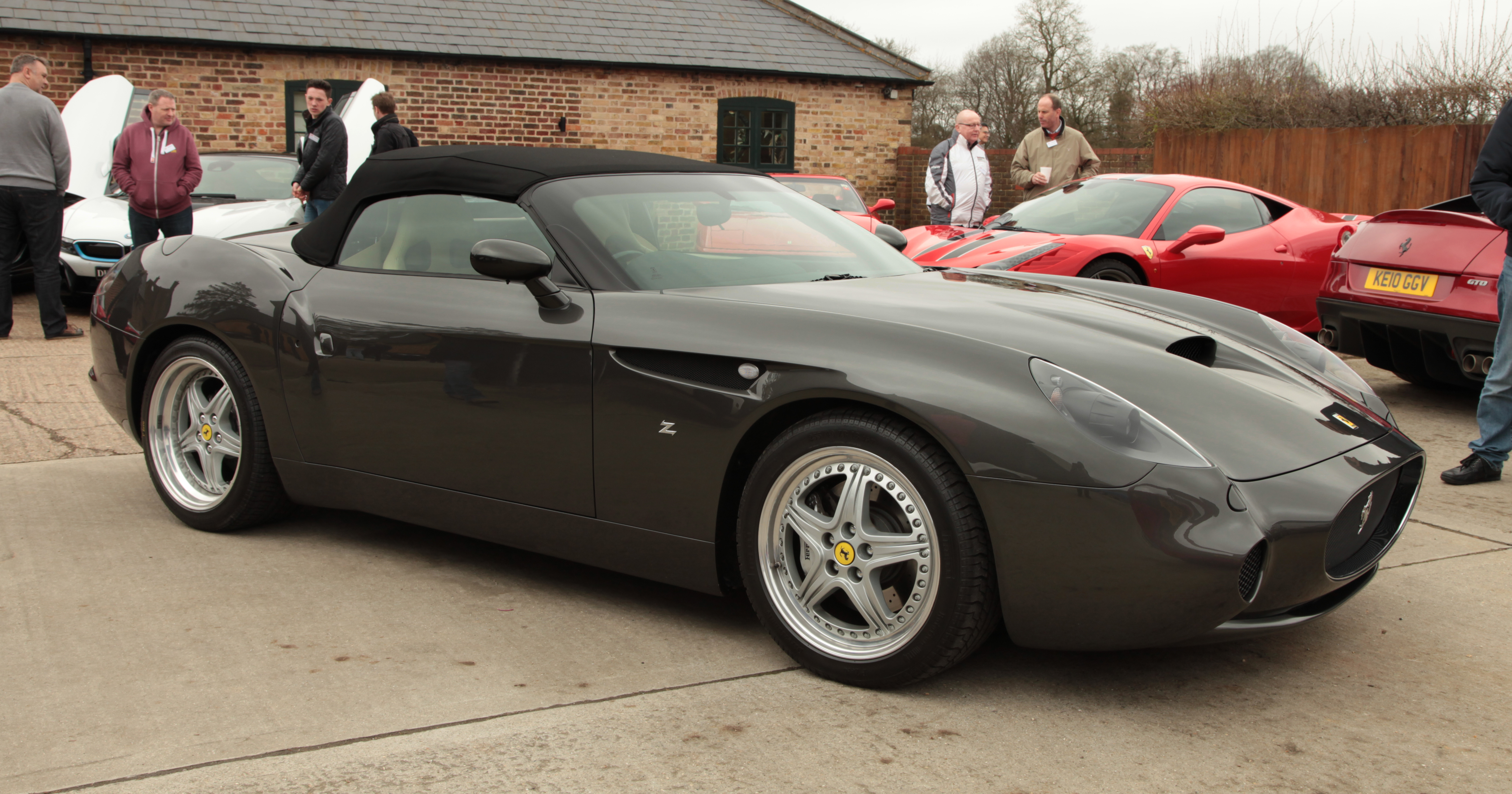
Chassis no. 124138 with the roof up

=== Touring Superleggera Veloce12 ===
Coachbuilt by Carrozzeria Touring Superleggera, the Superleggera Veloce12 is a limited-edition grand tourer, based on Ferrari 550 with only 30 models planned and was unveiled at Monterey Car Week in 2024.

== Motorsport ==
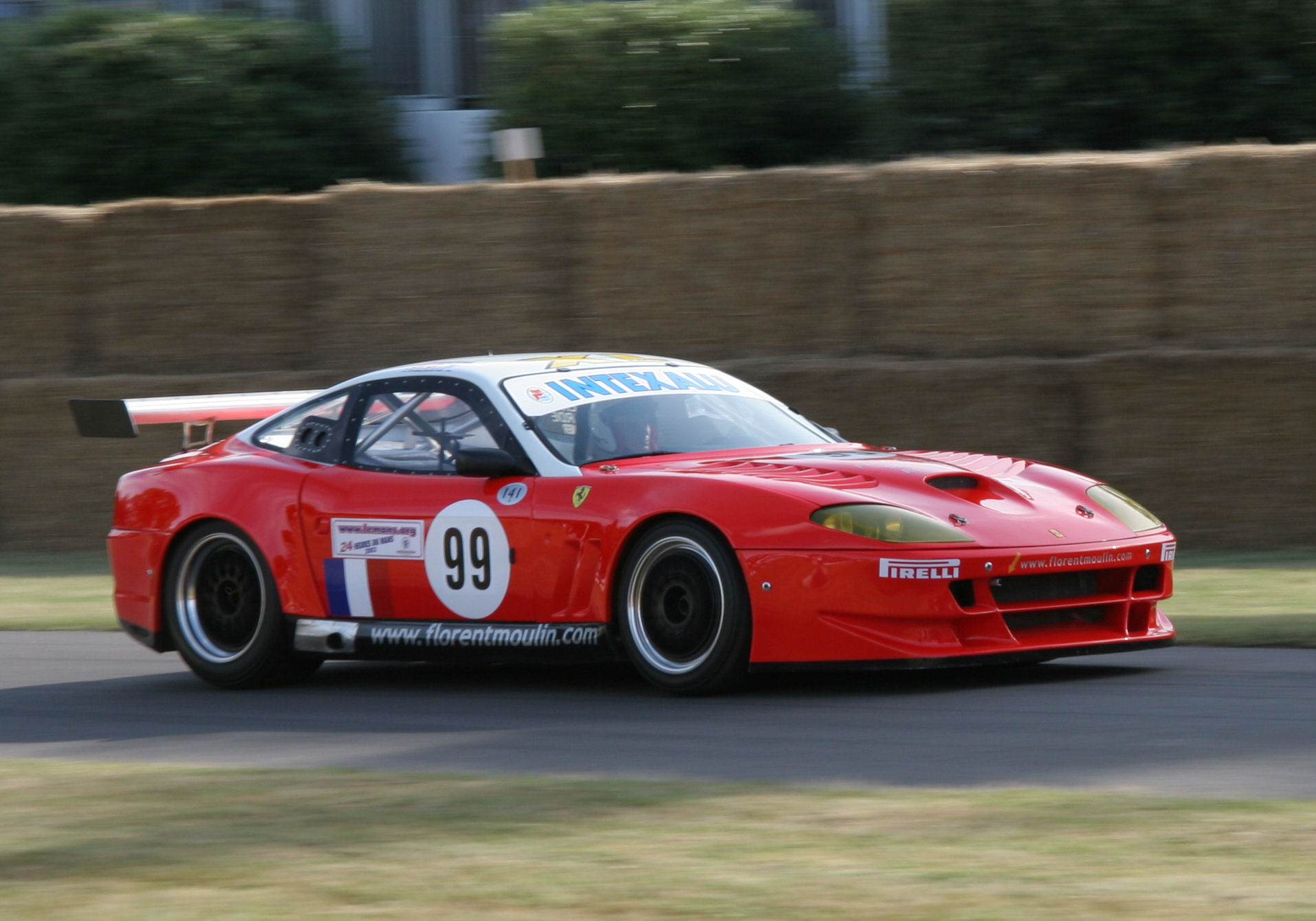
Team XL Racing's Ferrari 550 GT at the 2006 Goodwood Festival of Speed

Although not intended for motorsport, some privateer teams took it upon themselves to develop the 550 for use in various series. The first racing 550, known as 550 GT, was built for French team Red Racing to comply with international sporting regulations. The project was developed by Michel Enjolras and assembled in the Italtecnica workshop. The car was first tested in April 1999 and was used in the GT3 class of the French FFSA GT Championship. In 2001 the car was then sold to XL Racing who continued the development and built a second car, known as 550 XL entering the FFSA GT and the American Le Mans Series. The older 550 GT also made an appearance at the 2003 24 Hours of Le Mans in the ACO GT class but failed to finish due to technical problems.

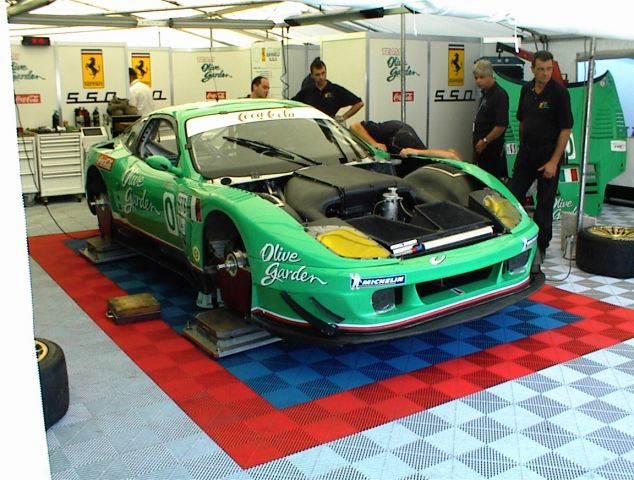
Team Rafanelli's 550 Millennio at the 2002 Grand Prix of Mosport

In 2000, with financial support from some investors led by Stéphane Ratel, Italtecnica created another 550 race car meeting the more powerful GT regulations in the FIA GT Championship, the car being named 550 Millennio. The first car debuted in the 2000 FIA GT Championship, entered by First Racing. The 2001 Championship saw two cars fielded by Team Rafanelli. The 550 Millennio was also developed to meet ACO LM-GTS regulations allowing Rafanelli to enter a single car in the 2002 American Le Mans Series season.

In November 2000, German entrepreneur and engineer Franz Wieth launched another racing version of the 550, developed by Baumgartner Sportwagen Technik, and named 550 GTS. Two cars were built, with Wieth Racing entering one in the 2001 FIA GT Championship, then again in 2003, 2004 and 2005. In 2006 the Wieth's Ferrari scored two wins in the Euro GT Series.

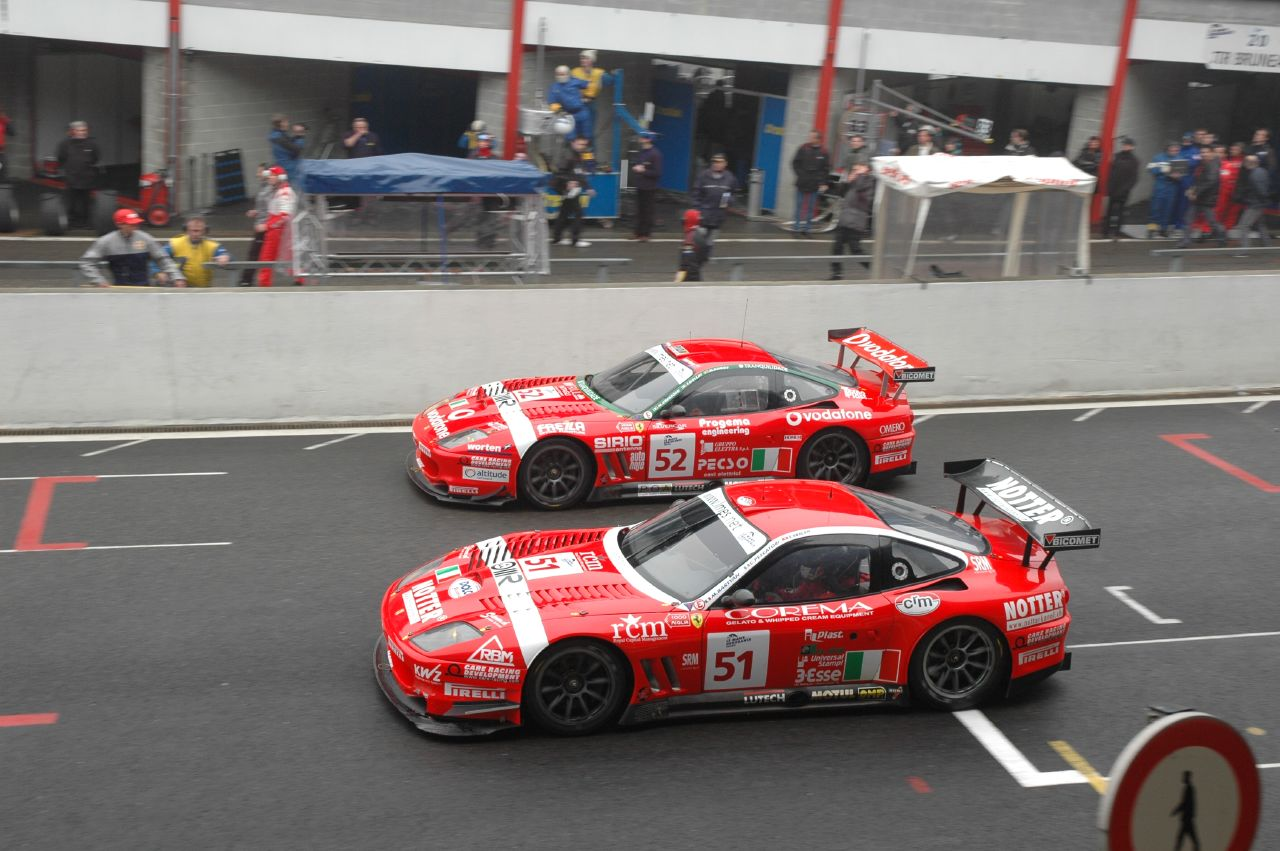
A pair of BMS Scuderia Italia 550-GTS' at the 2005 1000km of Spa

Commissioned by Frédéric Dor's company Care Racing Development, in 2001 Prodrive built a racing version of the 550 for various sports car series and especially the 24 Hours of Le Mans. Initially known as 550 GTO and then renamed 550 GTS (but not related to Wieth's project), a total of ten cars would be built over the next four years and campaigned by the Prodrive team as well as privateer customers. The cars were entirely built by Prodrive without any support from the Ferrari factory.

The factory Prodrive team would win two races in the 2001 FIA GT Championship debut. For 2002 the BMS Scuderia Italia team would take over in FIA GT, recording four wins, while the Prodrive squad would take a single win in the American Le Mans Series. 2003 would be the best year for the cars, as Prodrive won the GTS class at the 24 Hours of Le Mans and took second in the GTS class championship in the American Le Mans Series with four wins, while BMS Scuderia Italia gained eight race wins on that year's FIA GT championship.

BMS Scuderia Italia would again take the FIA GT Championship crown in 2004, while Larbre Compétition won the GT1 class championship in the new Le Mans Series. BMS Scuderia Italia moved then to the Le Mans Series as well taking that championship for 2005. In the meantime Prodrive switched to their next project, the Aston Martin DBR9, leaving the maintenance of the 550 GTS cars to Care Racing Development. Hitotsuyama Racing entered a car in the 2004 JGTC and 2005 Super GT seasons, then switched to the Japan Le Mans Challenge winning the GT1-class title in both 2006 and 2007 editions. In 2008 Argentinian Automóvil Club Argentina Team entered 2 Prodrive 550's, one of them scoring and achieving the fifth place in the Potrero de los Funes round. The last race of the 550 GTS was the 2009 FIA GT Paul Ricard 2 Hours where a car entered by French team Solution F achieved the seventh place.

In late 2003, Australian Nations Cup Championship team Mark Coffey Racing purchased a 550 GT from Team Rafanelli to run in the 2004 Australian Nations Cup Championship. The appearance of the V12 Ferrari in Australia was eagerly awaited by fans of the category and the car was to be driven by popular young Danish driver Allan Simonsen who prior to the championship had raced the car alongside David Brabham to win the Bahrain GT Festival. In what was a limited campaign (the car only raced at 4 of the 7 rounds), Simonsen finished 7th in the championship against cars such as the championship winning Lamborghini Diablo GTR, Chrysler Viper ACR, Porsche 911 GT2 and the controversial 7.0 litre Holden Monaros. Simonsen broke the class lap record and scored a race win in the first round of the season at the Adelaide Street Circuit.

Following the success of the Prodrive's 550 GTS, Ferrari would develop the 575 GTC racecar based on the 575M, offering it as a customer car for privateers.

== Awards and recognition ==
In 2004, Evo magazine ran a "Greatest Drivers' Car" showdown with the greatest cars from the previous ten years, including the Porsche 911 GT3, the Honda NSX-R, and the Pagani Zonda C12S. The 550 Maranello won the challenge. The magazine wrote: "As with all great cars, there's no one facet that dominates the experience ... Yes the engine is mighty, but the chassis is its equal. There's never been a supercar that's so exploitable and so rounded in its abilities."

The 5.5 L F133 V12 engine won the "over 4 litre" class of the International Engine of the Year award for 2000 and 2001.
