= Lorenzo Ramaciotti =

Italian car designer (born 1948)

Lorenzo Ramaciotti (born 1948) is an Italian car designer. Ramaciotti started his career with Pininfarina in 1972 and retired in 2005. In 2007 he became Group Chief of Design at Fiat Group Automobiles, responsible for all the Fiat Group brands, including Alfa Romeo, Lancia and Maserati. In 2015 he was replaced by Ralph Gilles.

== Career ==
Ramaciotti was born in Modena.

He graduated from Polytechnic University of Turin with a degree in mechanical engineering in 1972, and joined Pininfarina after graduating. He was appointed General Manager of Pininfarina Studi e Ricerche in early 1988 and in 2002 became managing director and CEO of Pininfarina Ricerca and Sviluppo and retired in 2005.

In 2007 he joined Fiat Group as Group Chief of Design after being head-hunted by Fiat's CEO Sergio Marchionne, overseeing design of all the Group marques. In 2011 he was appointed member of the Group Executive Council.

== Designs ==
Cars design overseen by Ramaciotti at Pininfarina:

- Ferrari 456 GT
- Ferrari 550 Maranello
- Alfa Romeo Dardo concept
- Ferrari 360 Modena
- Daewoo Tacuma
- Hyundai Matrix
- Ferrari F430
- Ferrari 612 Scaglietti
- Peugeot 406 Coupe

Cars designed by Ramaciotti at Centro Stile FCA

- Alfa Romeo Giulietta (2010)
- Maserati Quattroporte VI (2012)
- Alfa Romeo 4C (2013)

== Gallery ==
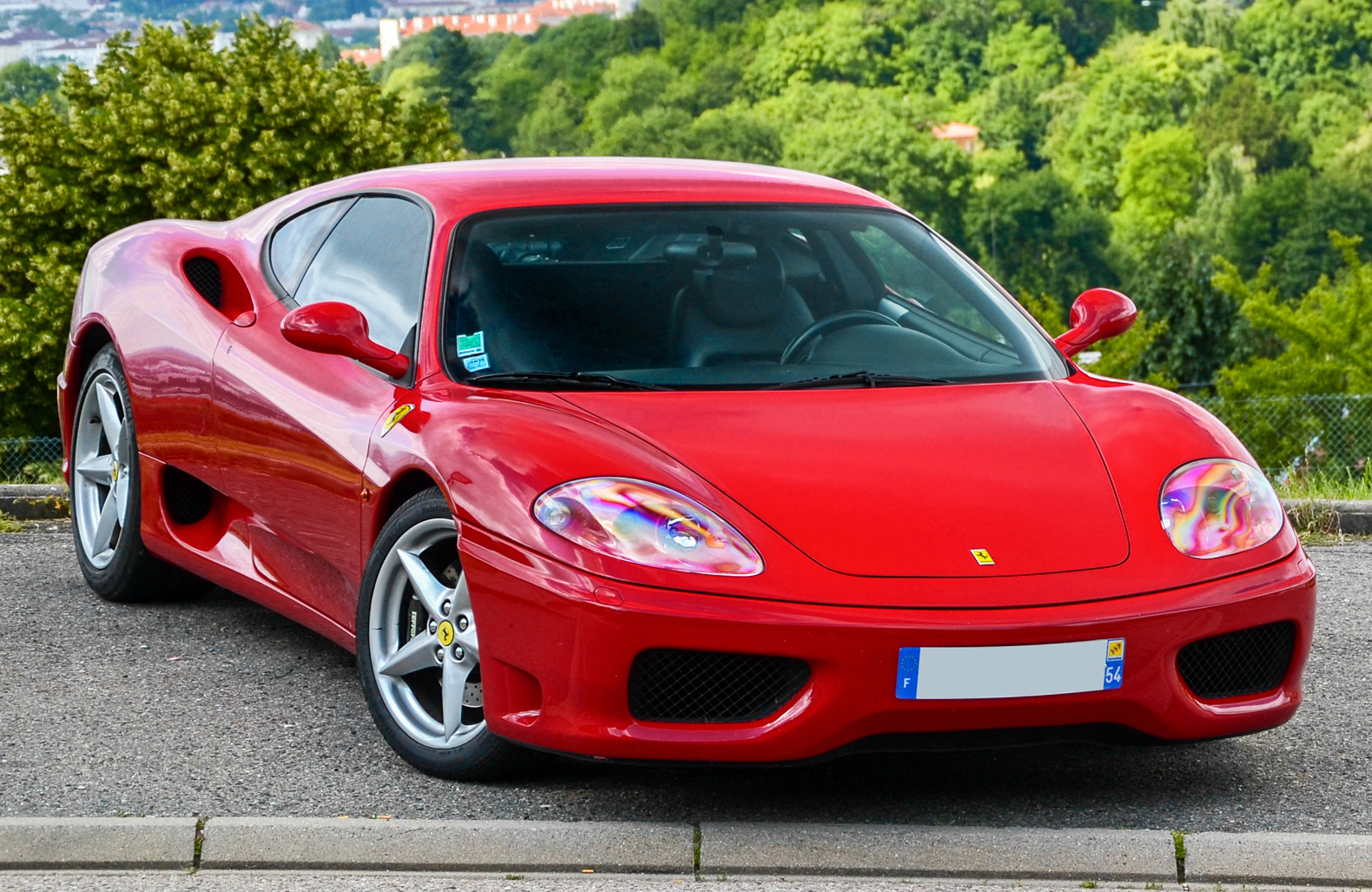
Ferrari 360

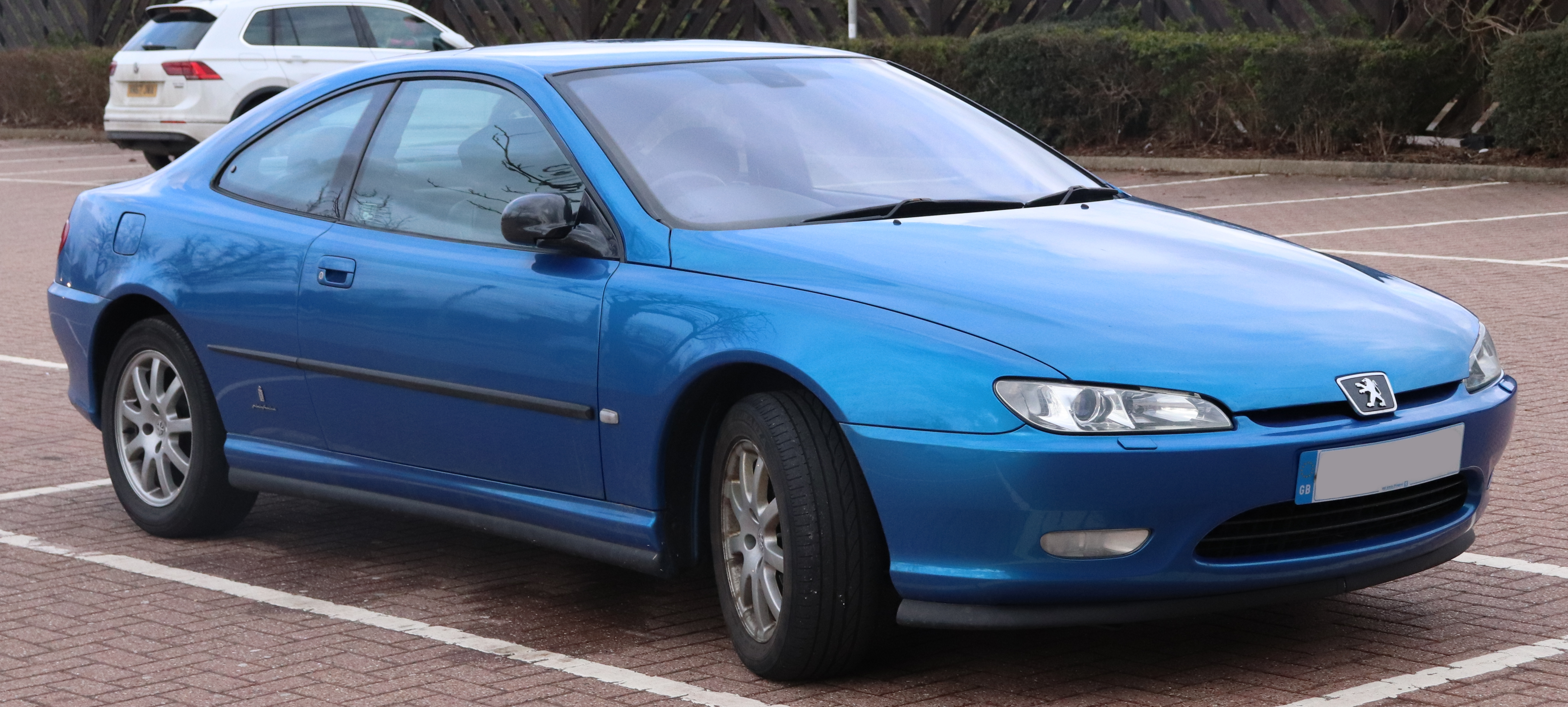
Peugeot 406 Coupe

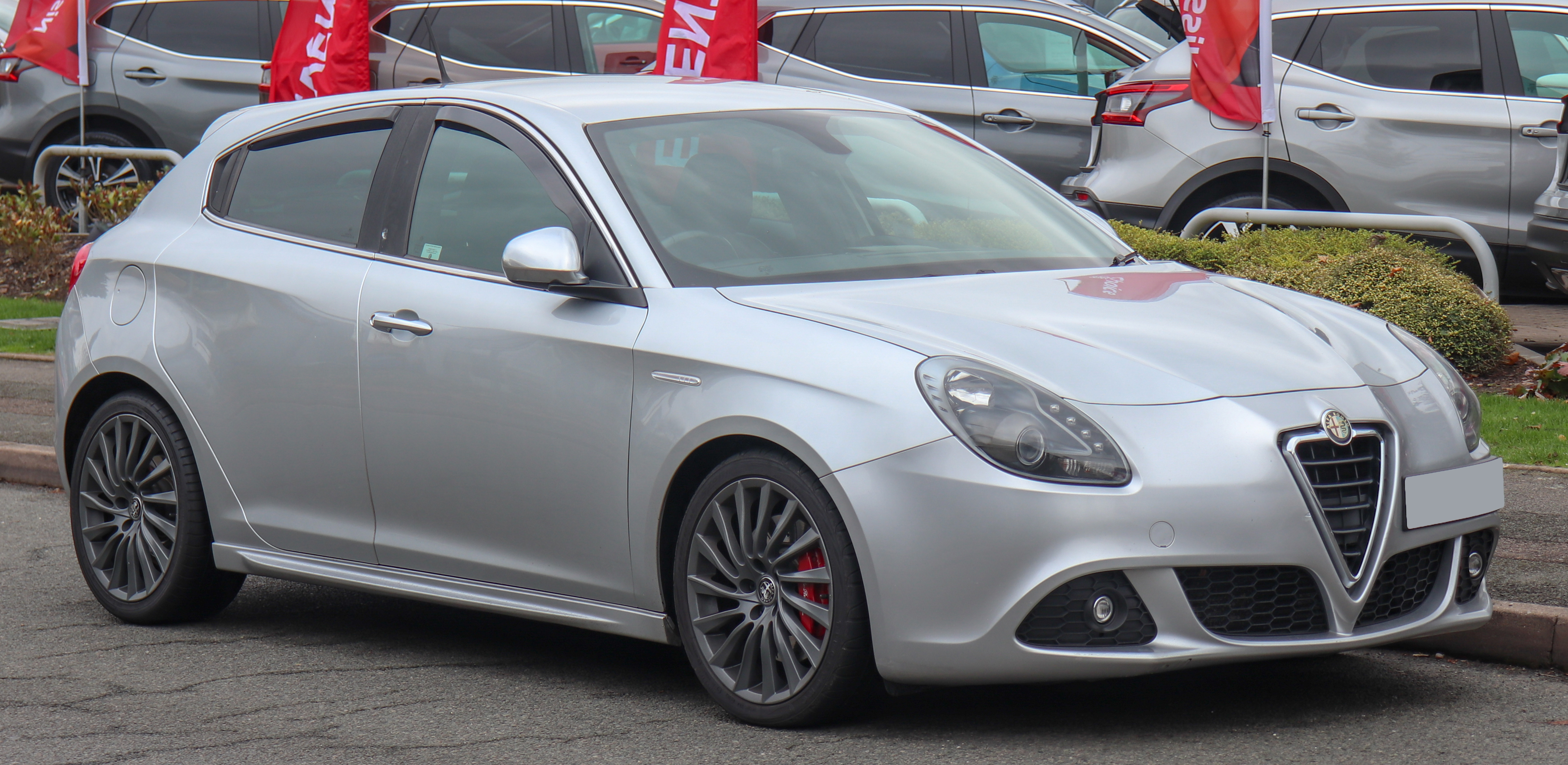
Alfa Romeo Giulietta

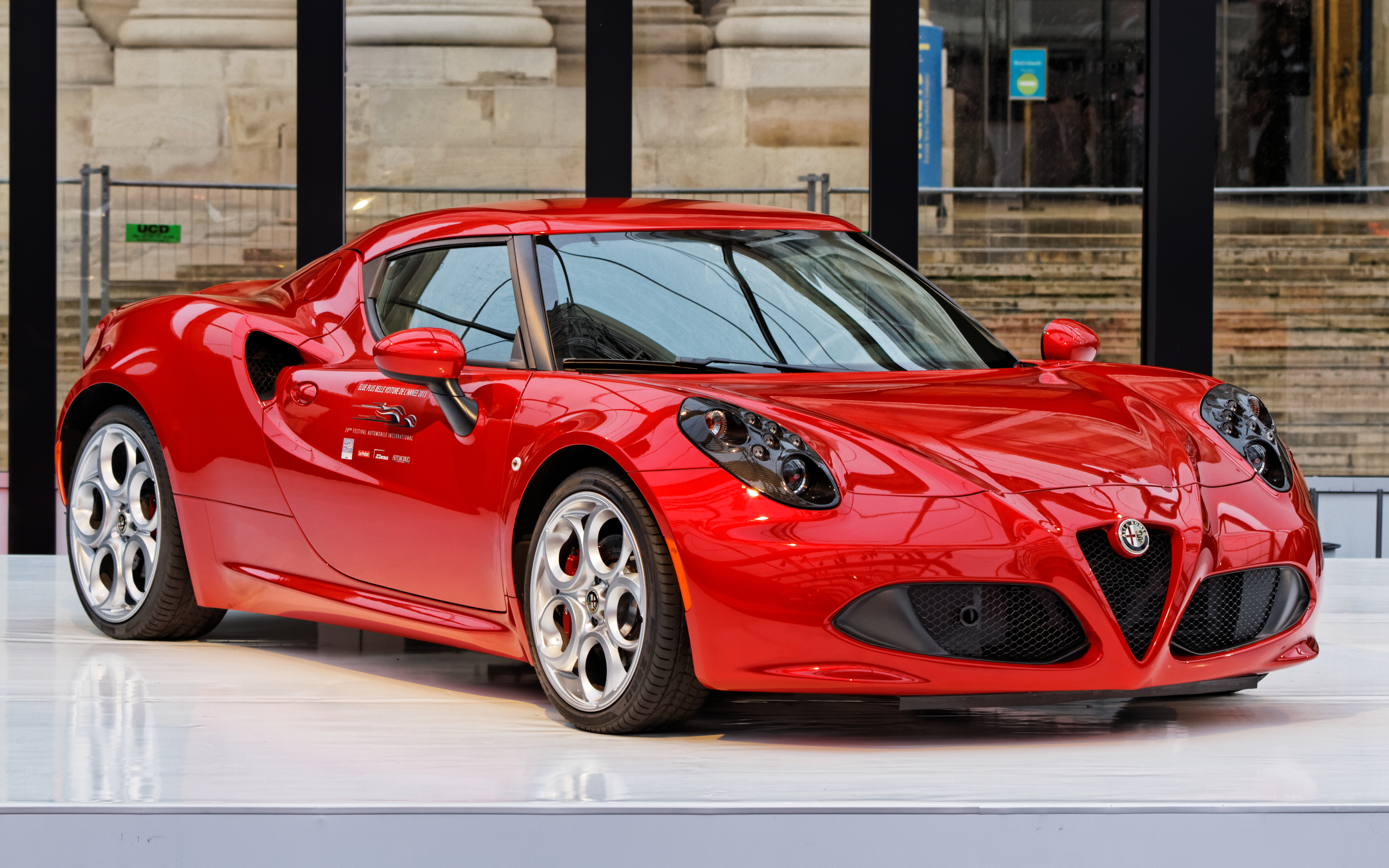
Alfa Romeo 4C
